= Dzogchen Ranyak Patrul Rinpoche =

Tibetan lama, teacher, and author

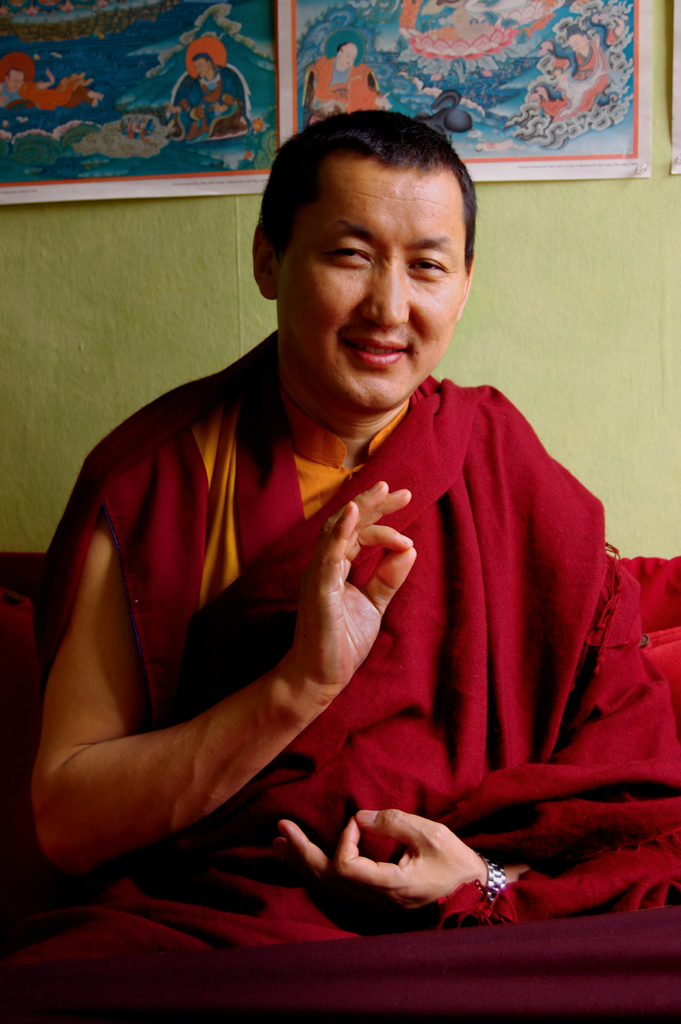
- Patrul Rinpoche
- Title: Rinpoche, Tulku, Khenpo

Personal life
- Born: 1963 (age 62–63) Kham, Tibet
- Education: Dzogchen Shri Singha University
- Website: patrulrinpoche.org

Religious life
- Religion: Tibetan Buddhism
- School: Nyingma, Dzogchen
- Lineage: Longchen Nyingthik

Senior posting
- Teacher: Drukpa Tulku Rinpoche, Pema Kalzang Rinpoche
- Reincarnation: Dza Patrul Rinpoche

Dzogchen Ranyak Patrul Rinpoche (Tibetan: རྫོགས་ཆེན་ར་ཉག་དཔལ་སྤྲུལ་རིན་པོ་ཆེ, Wylie: rdzogs chen ra nyag dpal sprul rin po che) (born 1963) is a Tibetan lama, teacher, and author in the Nyingma school of Tibetan Buddhism. He is the founder of the Dzogchen Centre Belgium, a branch of the Dzogchen Monastery in Tibet.

== Biography ==
Dzogchen Ranyak Patrul Rinpoche was born close to Rutam Orgyen Samten Chöling (Dzogchen Monastery) in the centre of Kham, Eastern Tibet, in 1963. His mother hailed from the family of his previous incarnation. His father was called Drupa. As a child he demonstrated excellent abilities in learning quickly and effortlessly. He began his studies at Dzogchen Monastery where he was also trained in Tantric rituals and assigned to the position of chöchen, the great chöpon. At that time he participated in reconstructing Dzogchen Monastery by drawing, painting and making masks. Later he continued his studies at Dzogchen Shri Singha University where he studied the traditional Tibetan curriculum from the practices of the three bases of discipline to the highest Tantras. He engaged in the practice of listening, reflecting and meditating through which he gained knowledge of great Indian commentaries and gained meditative experience. Through the practice of discipline he tamed his mindstream.

Among his teachers were great masters such as Khenchen Dechen Namdröl, Khenchen Pema Tsewang, Drukpa Rinpoche Thupten Nyima, Kyabje Pema Kalzang Rinpoche and Kyabje Alak Zenkar Rinpoche. Patrul Rinpoche continued his career of enlightened activity in Drupong Dzogchen monastery (Dzogchen Monastery in southern India) where he taught as a Khenpo for four years. While there, he founded a Dharma Centre of the Nyingthik Diamond Vehicle. At that time, Choktrul Sogyal Rinpoche bestowed him the title of supreme Dorje Lopön (master of ritual) and requested him to remain in the external seat of the Dzogchen Monastery for a long time. Also at that time, Minling Trichen Gyurme Kunzong Ongyal and Shapchoke Dzogchen Rinpoche announced that he was a true reincarnation of the former tulku and offered him the crown title of holder of the teachings of Drupe Ongshuk Gyalwa Dzogchenpa.

== Recognition and Enthronement ==
Dzogchen Ranyak Patrul Rinpoche was officially recognised as the fourth reincarnation of Dza Patrul Rinpoche (third reincarnation of Ranyak Patrul) on 7 April 1997 by Mindrolling Trichen Rinpoche, then head of the Nyingma school. In this letter was also an acknowledgement that there would be obstacles to Ranyak Patrul Rinpoche's activity and Mindrolling Trichen Rinpoche specified the practices that should be performed in Dzogchen. Dzogchen Jikme Losal Wangpo Rinpoche (the current reincarnation of Dzogchen Rinpoche) wrote a letter containing an aspiration prayer for the development of Patrul Rinpoche's activities for the benefit of the teachings and all beings. In 1999, the 14th Dalai Lama wrote a letter supporting Mindrolling Trichen Rinpoche's recognition letter.

Kyabje Pema Kalzang Rinpoche performed the enthronement ceremony in Brussels, Belgium, on 11 June 2000, and wrote a letter to say that Ranyak Patrul Rinpoche was one of the Dzogchen teachers from Tibet and that he acted as the representative of all the other Dzogchen masters of the Dzogchen Valley who could not be present on that day. Tulku Dakpa Rinpoche was also present.

== Altruistic Projects ==
In the West, Patrul Rinpoche has continued his activities to benefit beings and disseminate the Buddha's teachings around the world. His projects include:

- Zangdok Palri Institute in the West - runs two types of courses: a six-year degree course for Dzogchen practitioners and a non-degree course in general Buddhist studies.
- Zangdok Palri Temple in Tibet - is a preservation project for Tibetan culture and religion. Inaugurated in 2010.
- Sambhota Primary School - provides basic education to children from poor families.
- Sambhota Translation Group - preservation, translation and distribution of buddhist teachings, especially from the Longchen Nyingthik cycle.
- Wisdom Treasury Publishing House - prints a large number of Tibetan Buddhist texts, especially from the Longchen Nyingthik cycle, in Tibetan and Western languages.

In addition to teachings and drupchens at the Zangdok Palri Institute, Patrul Rinpoche travels the entire year, giving teachings at his Semrig Centers in Europe (Belgium, Bulgaria, Denmark, Georgia, Germany, Latvia, Luxembourg, Netherlands, Poland, Portugal, Russia, Sweden, Switzerland, Ukraine, United Kingdom) and Asia (Japan).

== Publications ==
In English:

- Dzogchen Ranyak Patrul Rinpoche, The True Words of the Great Rishi, Brussels, Belgium: Wisdom Treasury, 2008 ISBN 978-2-930447-06-3
- Dzogchen Ranyak Patrul Rinpoche, The Jewel Staircase to Liberation: A Brief Preliminary Practice, Brussels, Belgium: Wisdom Treasury, 2012
- Dzogchen Practitioners' Six-Year Course series:
  - Dzogchen Ranyak Patrul Rinpoche, Searching for Self-Liberation, Brussels, Belgium: Wisdom Treasury, 2006 (First year book)
  - Dzogchen Ranyak Patrul Rinpoche, Self-Liberation of Great Beings, Brussels, Belgium: Wisdom Treasury, 2006 ISBN 978-2-930447-02-5 (Second year book)
  - Dzogchen Ranyak Patrul Rinpoche, Great Oral Transmission of Self-Liberation, Brussels, Belgium: Wisdom Treasury, 2012 ISBN 978-2-930447-01-8 (Third year book)

In Russian:

- Дзогчен Раньяк Патрул Ринпоче, Истинные Слова Великого Риши, Brussels, Belgium: Wisdom Treasury, 2008 ISBN 978-5-94121-046-6
