= Guru yoga =

Tantric Buddhist meditation practice

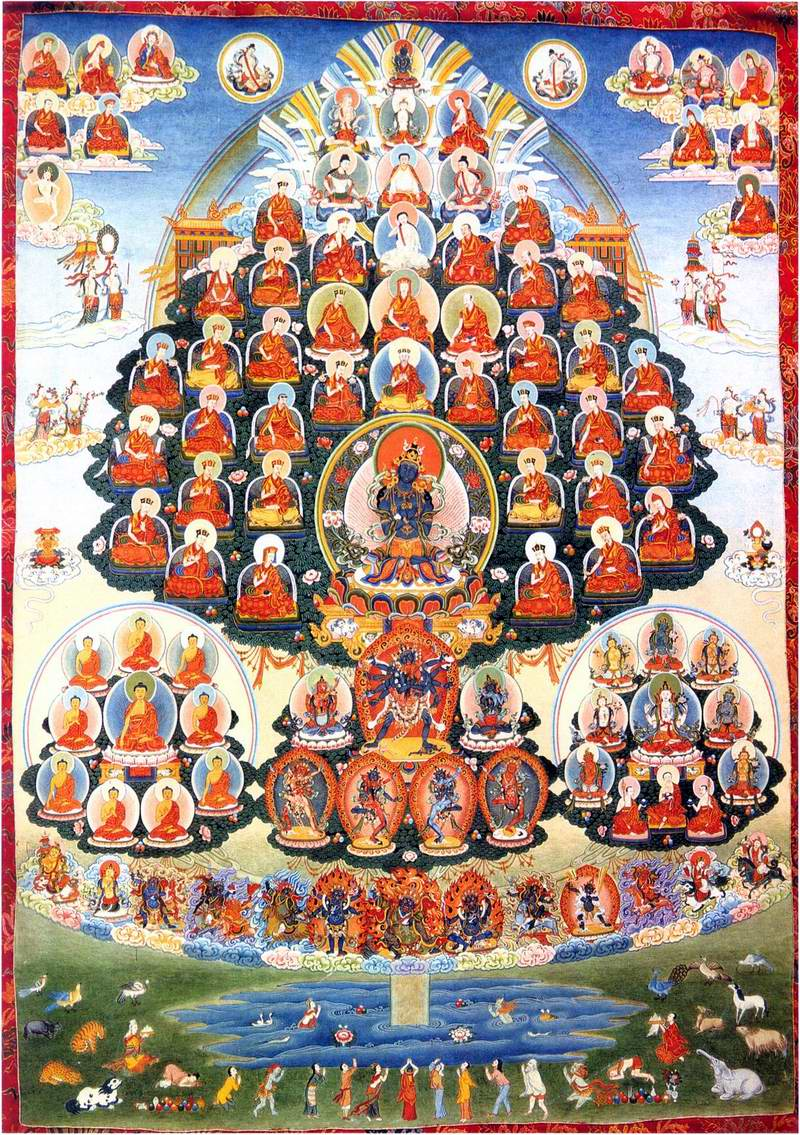
Thangka depicting the Refuge Tree of the Karma Kagyu Lineage by Sherab Palden Beru, c. 1972

In Vajrayana, guru yoga (Tib: bla ma'i rnal 'byor) is a tantric devotional practice in which the practitioner unites their mindstream with the mindstream of the body, speech, and mind of their guru. Guru yoga is akin to deity yoga since the guru (who can be a Buddha, a historical figure like Padmasambhava, or a living person) is visualized in the same manner as with a meditational deity. The process of guru yoga may entail visualization of a refuge tree as an invocation of the lineage, with the 'root guru' channeling the blessings of the entire lineage to the practitioner. The guru may be visualized as above the meditator, in front of them, or in their heart. Guru yoga may also include a liturgy, prayer, or mantra, such as the "Seven Line Prayer" of Padmasambhava, or the "Migtsema" (a prayer to Je Tsongkhapa).

== Background ==
As in other Buddhist traditions, an attitude of reverence for the teacher, or guru, is highly prized. (Note: Lama is the literal Tibetan translation of the Sanskrit guru. For a traditional perspective on devotion to the guru, see Tsong-kha-pa 2000, pp. 77–87. For a current perspective on the guru-disciple relationship in Tibetan Buddhism, see Berzin n.d.) A guru or lama is seen as an essential guide during tantric practice. Without the guru's example, blessings, and guidance, genuine progress in tantra is held to be impossible for all but the most keen and gifted. One particular feature of the Tantric view of teacher student relationship is that in Tibetan Buddhist tantra, one is instructed to regard one's guru as an awakened Buddha.

At the beginning of a public teaching, a lama will do prostrations to the throne on which he will teach due to its symbolism, or to an image of the Buddha behind that throne, then students will do prostrations to the lama after he is seated. Merit accrues when one's interactions with the teacher are imbued with such reverence in the form of guru devotion, a code of practices governing them that derives from Indian sources. (Note: Notably, Gurupancasika, Tib.: Lama Ngachupa, Wylie: bla-ma lnga-bcu-pa, "Fifty Verses of Guru-Devotion" by Aśvaghoṣa.) By such things as avoiding disturbance to the peace of mind of one's teacher, and wholeheartedly following his prescriptions, much merit accrues and this can significantly help improve one's practice.

== See also ==
- Bhakti yoga – Devotional path to moksha in Hinduism
- Guru in Buddhism – "Weighty with qualities"
- Guru puja – Similar devotional ritual in Hinduism
- Mahamudra – Union of wisdom and emptiness
- Samaya – Vows that binds guru and disciple
