= 2nd Dzogchen Rinpoche =

Gyurme Thekchok Tenzin (Tibetan: གྱུར་མེད་ཐེག་མཆོག་བསྟན་འཛིན, Wylie: gyur med theg mchog bstan vdzin, b.?) was the 2nd Dzogchen Rinpoche of Tibet.

== Nomenclature and etymology ==
Full nomenclature: Gyurme Thekchok Tenzin Thutop Wangpo Chok Thamchele Nampar Gyalwe De.

== Exegesis ==
The Second Dzogchen Rinpoche was born in Mongolia.

=== Teachers ===
The Second Dzogchen Rinpoche was a student of Ponlop (Tibetan; "governor"), Rabjampa and other disciples of the 1st Dzogchen Rinpoche, Pema Rikzin; namely: Gyalwang Kalzang Gyatso, Lochen Dharma Shri, Gyalse Peme Gyurme Gyatsho, Terchen Nyima Trakpa and son, Ngor Khenchen Palden Chokyong, amongst others.

The 2nd Dzogchen Rinpoche was involved with: "...the establishment of the great treasury, the printing house at Lhundrup Teng in Derge, by his patron, the King of Derge."

=== Sadhana ===
The 2nd Dzogchen Rinpoche is key in the lineage of a number of sadhana (Sanskrit): Phurba Yangsang ("innermost secret practice of Vajrakilaya"), Lama Demchok Khorlo (Tibetan; Sanskrit: Chakrasamvara), Shinje (Tibetan; Sanskrit: Yamantaka), Trochu (Tibetan: Heruka; "ten wrathful deities"), amongst others.

=== Students ===
The 2nd Dzogchen Rinpoche's principal students were: "...the Second Rabjam Gyurme Kunzang Namgyal, Ponlop Sangngak Tendzin, Nyitrul Pema Thekchok, Jetsunma Migyur Paldron."

== See also ==
- Kye-rim
- Dzog-rim
- Nyingma
