= Gebchak Gonpa =

Tibetan Buddhist nunneries

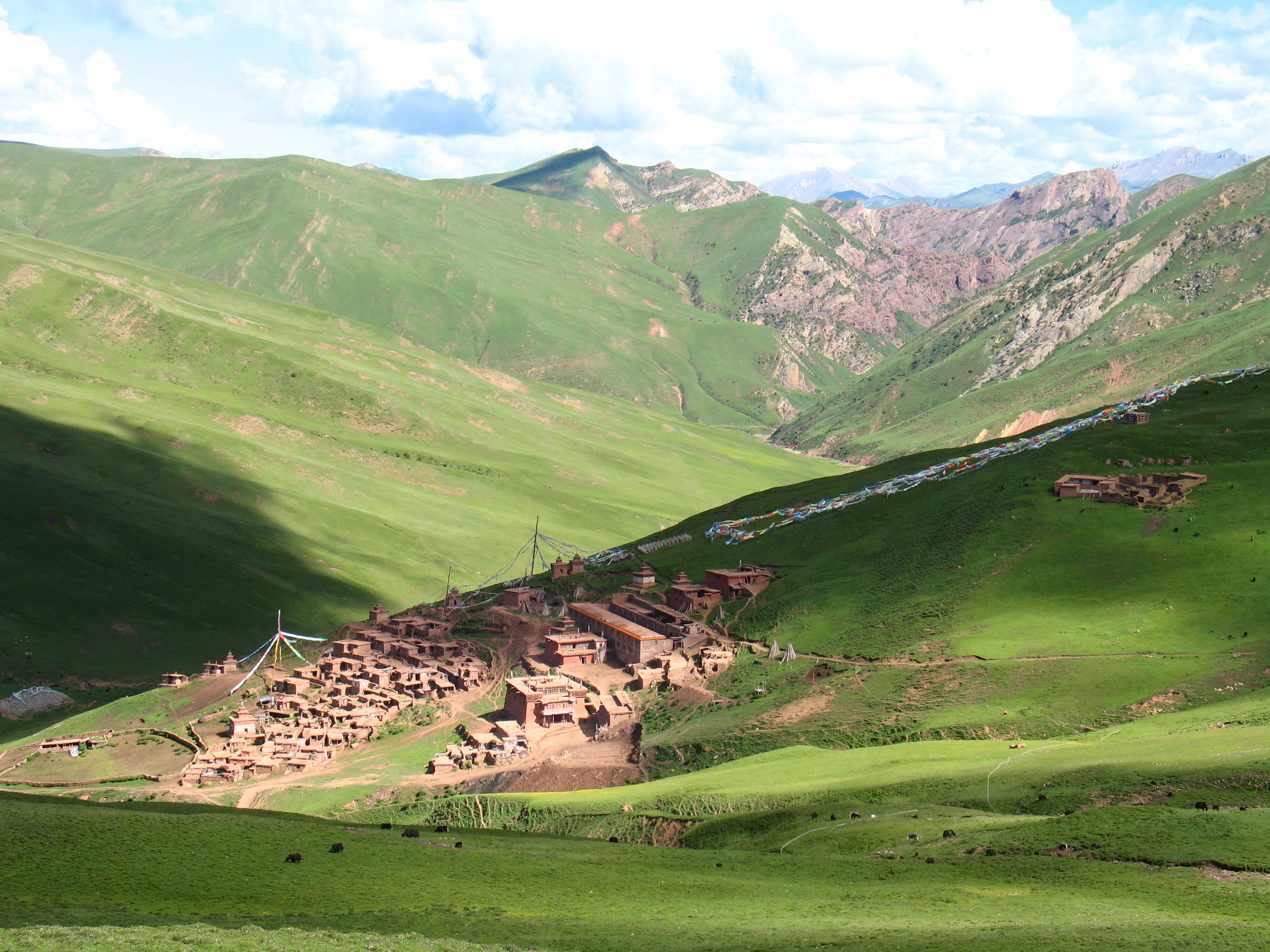
Gebchak Gonpa c. 2006 in Nangchen, Qinghai Province (Eastern Tibet)

Gebchak Gonpa - also spelled Gecha Gon, Gechak, Gechag, and Gebchak Gompa - lies in the remote mountains of Nangchen, Eastern Tibet (Nangqian County, Qinghai Province, PRC). It is the home of a spiritual lineage of female practitioners, or yogini, a nunnery of 350 nuns and the heart of a renowned practice tradition. Gebchak's practices come mainly from the Nyingma school of Tibetan Buddhism, while the Nunnery has been closely affiliated over its history with the Drukpa Kagyu lineage and with the Nangchen royal family.

Gebchak Gonpa is renowned for its training of female practitioners, and its large number of branch nunneries and monasteries following its practice traditions. Gebchak's yogini nuns are famed for their accomplishments in profound yogas and meditation, particularly in tsa lung and Dzogchen. Elderly nuns resident today say they witnessed practitioners attain the rainbow body of spiritual accomplishment in the early days of the nunnery.

== History ==
The first Tsoknyi Rinpoche instructed his heart son, Tsang-Yang Gyamtso, to build nunneries so that women would have the opportunity to practice. Prior to that, there had been an almost complete absence of female monastic communities in Nangchen for spiritually-minded women to join. Tsang-Yang Gyamtso founded Gebchak Gonpa in 1892 and over time great numbers of women came from many parts of Tibet to join in its unique system of practice. According to Tulku Urgyen:

Tsang-Yang followed Tsoknyi’s command and built two major nunneries, one of which had thirteen retreat centers. His benefit for beings became broader than his master’s. Most of the nuns practiced the revealed treasures of Ratna Lingpa, which include Hayagriva as well as the peaceful and wrathful deities. Each retreat center focused on a different cycle of these treasures.

Gebchak Gonpa's intensive retreat system includes a three-year retreat for all nuns followed by entry into one of sixteen retreat divisions, where they remain in practice for the rest of their lives. The Nunnery's practice system follows the terma (revealed treasure) collection of Ratna Lingpa, and Tsang-Yang Gyamtso's 16 volumes of commentary adapting the Ratna Lingpa practices to the needs of his disciples.

During the cultural revolution of the 1960s Gebchak Gonpa was destroyed and the remaining nuns were dispersed, threatening to destroy the tradition entirely.

== Present-day Gebchak Gonpa ==
Today, new generations of nuns and lamas are preserving Gebchak's practice lineage. The majority of Gebchak's nuns today are 45-55 years old, and were trained in all aspects of their practice lineage by the elderly nuns who had survived the Cultural Revolution. Beginning in China's reform and opening up era of the 1980s, these elderly nuns and a group of new nuns rebuilt and re-established Gebchak Gonpa, despite extreme physical hardships. Even today, Gebchak Gonpa's remote, high altitude location and rough physical conditions are challenging for the average visitor. It is a community of nuns for whom the contemplative quality of Buddhist practice takes precedence over the outer, material world.

The third reincarnation of Tsang-Yang Gyamtso is cherished by the nuns as the head guru of Gebchak Gonpa. Tsoknyi Rinpoche is also a key root guru of the Gebchak nuns and their lineage. Four Gebchak lamas presently live in Nangchen and look after the Nunnery's religious and practical affairs: Tsang-Yang Gyamtso III, Tsogyal Rinpoche III, Ngaksam Rinpoche III and Wangdrak Rinpoche III.

== Bibliography ==
- de Leon, J (2013). Gebchak, the Yogini Nuns of Tibet: The Lives and Teachings of these Remarkable Women and their Abbot. Sydney: Gebchak Rigpa Har-Sey.
- Kalden, Jampa (December 22, 2010). Calling the Lama from Afar. Amazon Digital Services LLC. p. 274.
- McDougal, E (2018). 'Coming Down the Mountain: Transformations of Contemplative Culture in Eastern Tibet', Colonial Transformation and Asian Religions in Modern History. Cambridge Scholars' Publishing. pp. 152–169.
- Rinpoche, Tulku Urgyen (August 19, 2005). Blazing Splendor: The Memoirs of Tulku Urgyen Rinpoche (First ed.). Rangjung Yeshe Publications. pp. 434. ISBN 9627341568.
