= Palden =

Palden may refer to:

- Khenchen Palden Sherab (1938–2010), scholar and lama in the Nyingma school of Tibetan Buddhism
- Lobsang Palden Yeshe (1738–1780), the Sixth Panchen Lama of Tashilhunpo Monastery in Tibet
- Palden Gyatso (1933–2018), Tibetan Buddhist monk
- Palden Lhamo, protecting Dharmapala of the teachings of Gautama Buddha in the Gelug school of Tibetan Buddhism
- Palden Tenpai Nyima (1782–1853), the Seventh Panchen Lama of Tibet
- Palden Thondup Namgyal (1923–1982), the 12th and last Chogyal (king) of Sikkim
- Sherab Palden Beru (1911–2012), exiled Tibetan thangka artist
