= Patrul Rinpoche =

Tibetan Buddhist teacher (Nyingma school) (1808–1887)

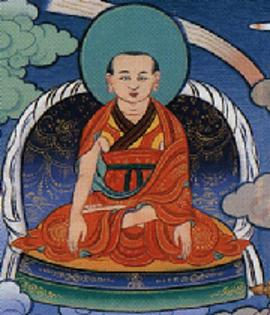
Patrul Rinpoche Tibetan yogi

Patrul Rinpoche (Tibetan: དཔལ་སྤྲུལ་རིན་པོ་ཆེ, Wylie: dpal sprul rin po che) (1808–1887) was a teacher and author from the Nyingma school of Tibetan Buddhism.

== Biography ==
Patrul Rinpoche was born in Dzachukha, a nomadic area of Golok Dzachukha, Eastern Tibet in 1808, and was recognized as the reincarnation of Palgé Samten Phuntsok and was given the name Orgyen Jikmé Chökyi Wangpo. With Dola Jikmé Kalzang, Jikmé Ngotsar, Gyalsé Shenpen Thayé and other teachers, he studied Longchen Rabjam's Trilogy of Finding Comfort and Ease, The Way of the Bodhisattva (Bodhicaryavatara), Secret Essence (Guhyagarbha) Tantra and many other works related to sutra and tantra, as well as the ordinary sciences. From Shechen Öntrul Thutob Namgyal, he received the reading transmission for the Translated Word of the Buddha (Kangyur) and teachings on Sanskrit grammar. He received the transmissions for the Kangyur and Tengyur in their entirety, together with the writings of many masters of the old and new translation schools.

He received instruction on the Longchen Nyingtik Ngondro some twenty-five times from Jikmé Gyalwé Nyugu, and Patrul Rinpoche completed the required practices the same number of times. In addition, he received instruction on tsa-lung practice and Dzogchen, and studied many of the cycles of practice found in the canonical scriptures (kama) of the Nyingma Vajrayana. Do Khyentse Yeshe Dorje introduced him to the pure awareness of rigpa while exhibiting wild and eccentric behaviour. He trained for a long time in the Longchen Nyingtik tsa-lung practices, and he received many teachings from Dzogchen Rinpoche Mingyur Namkhé Dorje and other masters.

While remaining for long periods near Dzogchen Monastery in the isolated hermitages of Rudam, such as the Yamantaka Cave and the Long Life cave, he put his energy into the practice of meditation and, it is said, attained a realization that was as vast as space.

From the age of thirty, he travelled to Serthar, Yarlung Pemako and other places, teaching extensively on the Secret Essence Tantra. To assemblies in Serthar and in the upper and lower regions of the Do valley he taught on The Way of the Bodhisattva, Maṇi Kambum, Aspiration Prayer of Sukhavati and so on. He made efforts to put an end to robbery and banditry and abolished the custom of serving meat at special gatherings. He also went to Dzamthang and studied the Six Yogas with Tsangpa Ngawang Chöjor, and he went to Minyak, where he had extensive discussions with Dra Geshe Tsultrim Namgyal on the prajnaparamita and other topics.

In Shri Singha college at Dzogchen Monastery and at Pemé Thang and other places, he turned the wheel of Dharma uninterruptedly, teaching on the treatises of Maitreya, the Middle Way, Abhidharma, Secret Essence Tantra, Treasury of Precious Qualities, Ascertainment of the Three Vows and other topics. In particular, when he taught on The Way of the Bodhisattva in the vicinity of Dzogchen Shri Singha for several years in succession, large numbers of flowers called Serchen, with between thirty and fifty petals, blossomed all of a sudden, and they became known as ‘bodhicharyavatara flowers.’

He went to Kathok Dorje Den, where he offered prostrations and 'circumambulated' (Wylie: skor ba) the reliquaries of the three great masters Dampa Deshek, Tsangtön Dorje and Jampa Bum. At the request of Situ Choktrul Chökyi Lodrö and others, he gave extensive explanations on The Way of the Bodhisattva to the whole assembly of monks. He went to major monasteries of the Riwo Gendenpa tradition such as Sershul, Labtridu, Chuhor and others and taught elaborately on The Way of the Bodhisattva and other topics.

Patrul Rinpoche established a teaching centre in the vicinity of Dzagyal Monastery and he repaired the large complex of walls of ‘mani stones' (Wylie: do-bum) built by his previous incarnation Palge Samten Phuntsok, which thereafter became known as the Patrul Dobum. His disciples included masters of the Nyingma school such as Kathok Situ Choktrul Chökyi Lodrö, the Fifth Dzogchen Rinpoche Thubten Chökyi Dorje, Gyarong Namtrul Kunzang Thekchok Dorje, the second and third Dodrupchens, Jikme Phuntsok Jungne and Jikmé Tenpe Nyima, Dechen Rigpé Raldri, who was the son of Do Khyentse Yeshe Dorje, Khenpo Shenga, Adzom Druktrul Droddul Dorje, Tertön Sogyal Lerab Lingpa, Jamgon Ju Mipham Gyatso, Khenpo Pema Vajra, Nyoshul Lungtok, Alak Dongak Gyatso and others. In addition, his disciples included many masters of the Sakya, Gelugpa and Kagyü schools, such as Sershul Lharampa Thubten, Palpung Lama Tashi Özer and Ju Lama Drakpa Gyaltsen.

Patrul Rinpoche died on the eighteenth day of the fourth lunar month in the Fire Pig year of the fifteenth calendrical cycle (1887).

Patrul Rinpoche's writings were not collected by the master himself or by his attendants, and thus many of them were never carved into printing blocks. Those which were printed and which are now to be found comprise six volumes. These include works of various styles and genres, including commentaries on and structural outlines (sa bcad) for the treatises of Maitreya, The Way of the Bodhisattva, Treasury of Precious Qualities and other texts, such as The Words of My Perfect Teacher, and miscellaneous writings including The Drama in the Lotus Garden, which was written to console a young nobleman from Derge called Trashi Deleg whose young bride had been killed in an epidemic.

== Publications ==
- Rinpoche, Patrul; Khyentse, Dilgo (1993), The Heart Treasures of the Enlightened Ones, Shambhala Publications, ISBN 0-87773-493-3.
- Rinpoche, Patrul (2010), Words of My Perfect Teacher, Yale University Press, ISBN 978-0300165326.
- Rinpoche, Patrul; Nyima Tsering, Acharya (2006), The Lotus Garden's Play, ISBN 81-903344-0-9 (Free download here).
- Rinpoche, Patrul; Nyima Tsering, Acharya (2010), The Way of Living, ISBN 81-903344-1-7 (Free download here).

== See also ==
- The Treasury of Lives: Biographies of Himalayan Religious Masters

== Sources ==
- Ricard, Matthieu (2017), Enlightened Vagabond: The Life and Teachings of Patrul Rinpoche, Shambhala Publications, ISBN 978-1-61180-330-3
- Rinpoche, Patrul (2001), Die Worte meines vollendeten Lehrers, Arbor Verlag, ISBN 3-924195-72-2
- Zenkar Rinpoche, Alak (2006), A Brief Biography of Dza Patrul Rinpoche (1808-1887), Lotsawa House
- Thondup, Tulku; Talbott, Harold (1996), Masters of Meditation and Miracles: Lives of the Great Buddhist Masters of India and Tibet, Shambhala Publications, ISBN 1-56957-134-1
