= Jikme Losel Wangpo, 7th Dzogchen Rinpoche =

7th Dzogchen Rinpoche of Tibet

Jikme Losel Wangpo (Tibetan: འཇིགས་མེད་བློ་གསལ་དབང་པོ།, Wylie: vjigs med blo gsal dbang po; born 1964) is the 7th Dzogchen Rinpoche of Tibet in the Nyingma tradition of Tibetan Buddhism. He is said to be the 7th reincarnation of Pema Rigdzin.

Wangpo was recognized by the high lama Dodrupchen Rinpoche, and this was subsequently confirmed by Tenzin Gyatso, 14th Dalai Lama. His enthronement ceremony took place on 8 October 1972.
