= Jigdrel Changchub Dorje, 6th Dzogchen Rinpoche =

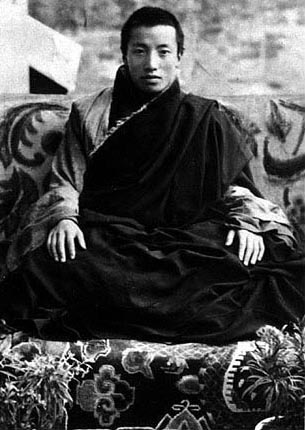

Jigdrel Changchub Dorje (Tibetan: འཇིགས་བྲལ་བྱང་ཆུབ་རྡོ་རྗེ་, Wylie: vjigs bral byang chub rdo rje, 1935–1959) was the 6th Dzogchen Rinpoche of Tibet in the Nyingma sect of Tibetan Buddhism.

He was a close friend of the young Tenzin Gyatso, 14th Dalai Lama who was born in the same year as he. The 14th Dalai Lama awarded Jigdrel the title of Hu Thok, which is the highest ranking after the King of Tibet.

Living at Dzogchen Monastery in historical Kham in Eastern Tibet, he was killed on the invasion by the Chinese in 1959 as it became a part of Sichuan where it stands today. He was just 24 years old.
