= Acharya Nyima Tsering =

Acharya Nyima Tsering was a Tibetan writer and a translator from Tibetan to English.

== Biography ==
Nyima Tsering (1963–10 February 2011) graduated from the Central Institute of Higher Tibetan Studies in Sarnath, Varanasi, where he attained the degree of Acharya (Master of Philosophy) degree in 1993.

He conducted research on Buddhist Philosophy, worked as a translator of Buddhist teachings for international student groups, and lectured at universities and other institutions in the US and India. He also participated in seminars, gave workshops and lectures organized by Tibetan government and non government organizations. In addition, he published translations and his own commentaries on major Buddhist teachings, and authored scholarly articles, romantic and patriotic poems in English and Hindi.

Nyima Tsering died on 10 February 2011, in Dharamsala (India).

== Publications ==
=== Translation ===
- Commentary on the Thirty Seven Practices of a Boddhisattva, by the 14th Dalai Lama, Paljor Publications, 2002, ISBN 81-85102-97-X ; Vyvyan Cayley, Mike Gilmore, Library of Tibetan Works and Archives, 1995
- The Lotus Garden's Play, by Patrul Rinpoche, Ed Vidhyadhara, 2006, ISBN 81-903344-0-9 (Free download here)
- The Way of Living, by Patrul Rinpoche, Ed Vidhyadhara, 2010, ISBN 81-903344-1-7 (Free download here)
- Mulamadhayamika Karika, by the 14th Dalai Lama

=== Books ===
- Essence of Mind Training, Paljor Publications, 2002, ISBN 81-86230-10-6
- The Wisdom's Light
