= Tibetan tantric practice =

Tantric practices in Tibetan Buddhism

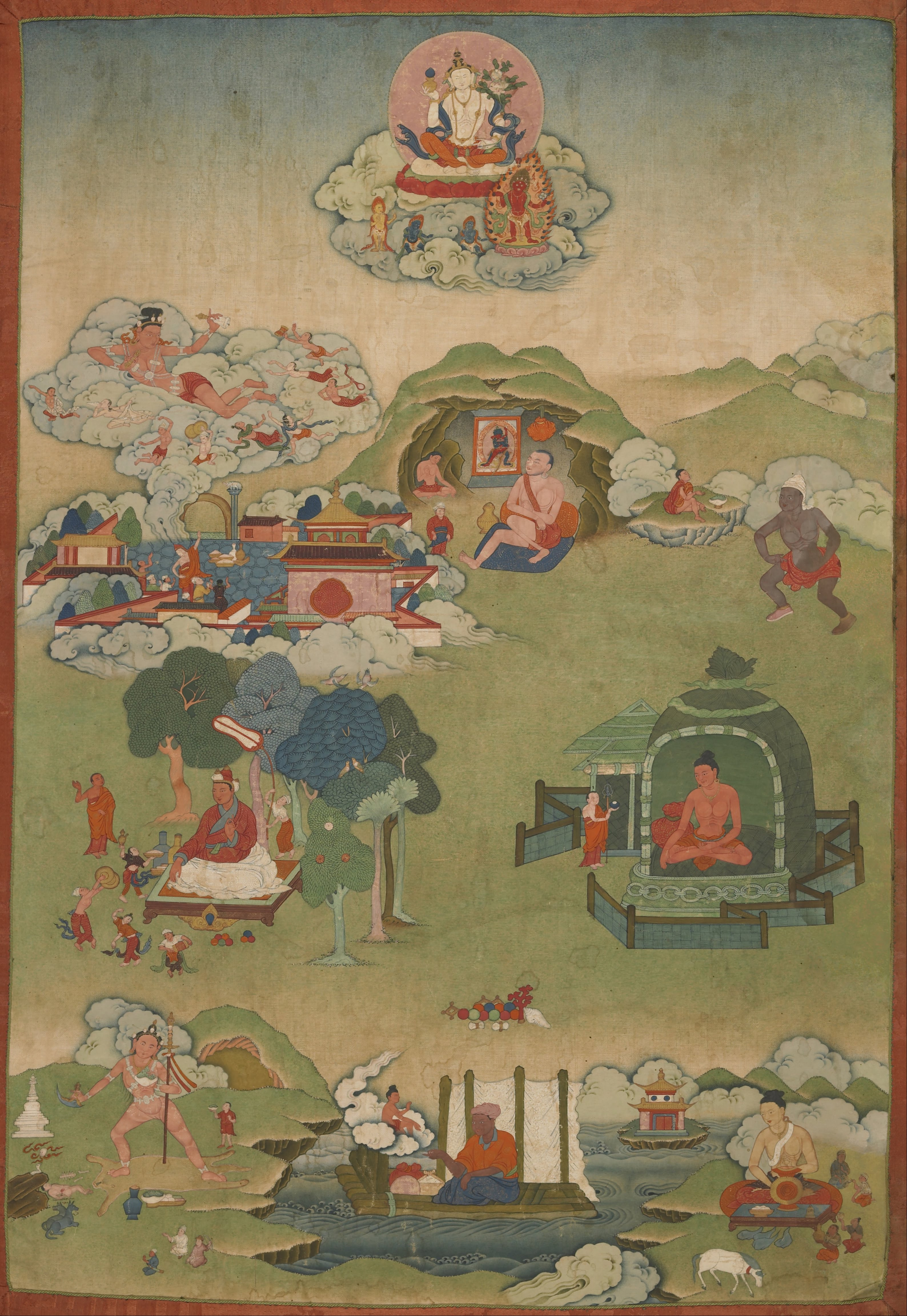
A painting of various Mahasiddhas practicing different tantric yogas

Tibetan tantric practice, also known as "the practice of secret mantra", and "tantric techniques", refers to the main tantric practices in Tibetan Buddhism. The great Rime scholar Jamgön Kongtrül refers to this as "the Process of Meditation in the Indestructible Way of Secret Mantra" and also as "the way of mantra", "way of method" and "the secret way" in his Treasury of Knowledge. Many Vajrayāna Buddhist practices are drawn from the Buddhist tantras and are often not found in "common" (i.e. non-tantric) Mahayana (but this varies, as some Mahayana sutras have dharanis and other esoteric elements). Vajrayāna practices are seen by Buddhists who follow Vajrayāna traditions, including Tibetans, as the fastest and most powerful path to Buddhahood.

In Tibetan Buddhism, the higher tantric yogas are generally preceded by preliminary practices (Tib. ngondro), which include sutrayana practices (i.e. non-tantric Mahayana practices) as well as preliminary tantric meditations. Tantric initiation is required to enter into the practice of tantra.

Unsurpassable Yoga Tantra (Skt. anuttarayogatantra, also known as Mahayoga) are in turn seen as the highest tantric practices in Tibetan Buddhism. Anuttarayoga tantric practice is divided into two stages, the generation stage and the completion stage. In the generation stage, one meditates on emptiness and visualizes one's chosen deity (yidam), its mandala and companion deities, resulting in identification with this divine reality (called "divine pride"). This is also known as deity yoga (devata yoga).

In the completion stage, the focus is shifted from the form of the deity to direct realization of ultimate reality (which is defined and explained in various ways). Completion stage practices also include techniques that work with the subtle body substances (Skt. bindu, Tib. thigle) and "vital winds" (vayu, lung), as well as the luminous or clear light nature of the mind. They are often grouped into different systems, such as the six dharmas of Naropa, or the six yogas of Kalachakra.

There are also practices and methods which are sometimes seen as being outside of the two tantric stages, mainly Mahamudra and Dzogchen (Atiyoga).

== Philosophical view ==
The philosophical view of Indo-Tibetan Vajrayāna is based on the Madhyamaka and Yogacara schools of Buddhist philosophy. The major difference seen by Vajrayāna thinkers between tantra and common Mahayana is that tantric Buddhism contains numerous useful methods (upaya) not found in Mahayana, which provide a faster vehicle to liberation. For example, the Nyingma scholar Ju Mipham writes that secret mantra has a "distinctive abundance of skillful methods" which allows one to awaken in a swift manner and without hardships.

In Tibetan Buddhist tantra, the Madhyamaka theory of emptiness is central, and it is generally held that one must have some understanding of emptiness before practicing tantra. The doctrine of Buddha-nature or "Buddha embryo" (tathāgatagarbha) and the doctrine of the luminous nature of the mind (Skt: prakṛti-prabhāsvara-citta, T. ’od gsal gyi sems) or purity of the mind (prakrti-parisuddha) are also important theories for Tantric practice. According to Tibetan Buddhism, all beings are seen as containing the "buddha embryo". Even though this Buddha potential is innately present, it is covered over by defilements.

In Tibetan Buddhism, there is said to be no strict separation between samsara and nirvana, rather they exist in a continuum. Indeed, "continuum" is the main meaning of the term "tantra" (Tib. rgyud). It is this continuum that connects samsara and nirvana that forms the theoretical foundation for Vajrayana practice. This "tantra" is referred to by numerous terms, such as the causal continuum, Buddha nature, ultimate bodhicitta, mind's emptiness of true existence, the ground, the ground maṇḍala, the "ground of all", the original Buddha, the authentic condition, primordial reality, "affinity for enlightenment", "essence of enlightenment", "pristine awareness", and "ineffable emptiness and clarity."

The Nyingma master Longchenpa meanwhile refers to this ground as "basic space, the utterly lucid nature of phenomena, completely pure by its very nature" and as "timeless awareness as the basic space of phenomena."

In Tibetan Buddhism, there are actually said to be three "continuums" ("tantras"):

- The continuum of cause (Tib. rgyu, Skt. hetu), the Buddha embryo, the fundamental cause for awakening.
- The continuum of method (thabs, upaya), the practices and skillful means which are the contributory condition for awakening.
- The continuum of result (’bras bu, phala), full Buddhahood, complete awakening.

As Jamgön Kongtrül states, the tantra of cause "denotes the mind of awakening [bodhicitta], Ever-Perfect (Samantabhadra), which has neither beginning nor end, in nature luminous clarity. It is 'continuous' since, from time without beginning up to the attainment of enlightenment, it has always been present without any interruption." Furthermore, from the perspective of Unsurpassed Yoga Tantra, the causal continuum is said to abide in the center of the body as "the pristine awareness dimension of the nature of great bliss." Thus, the Hevajra Tantra states:

Great pristine awareness is present in the body. Totally devoid of all conceptuality; It is that which pervades all things. Although abiding in the body, it did not arise from it.

There is disagreement among the different Tibetan scholars on the nature of the ground continuum. Some explain it as a mere emptiness of inherent existence (i.e. as a non-implicative negation sometimes termed rangtong). Others explain it as a negation that implies the presence of positive qualities, a view called shentong. There is further disagreement among Tibetan Buddhist thinkers on whether Buddhist tantra has a different view than non-tantric ("Sūtra") Mahayana Buddhist thought. In the Gelug school for example, it is said there is no difference in the view of tantra and the Madhyamaka view of emptiness of inherent existence (which is considered the highest). The only difference is in method.

However, some thinkers of the Nyingma school (such as Rongzom and Ju Mipham) do argue that there is a higher view in tantra. According to Mipham, this difference lies in "the way that the subject sees the basic space of phenomena." Mipham explains this view as follows: "all phenomena that comprise appearance and existence are primordially pure as the maṇḍala of enlightened body, speech, and mind." This "maṇḍala of the ground", is "the ultimate natural state of all phenomena, which is primordially of an enlightened nature within great purity and equality."

=== Tantric yoga theory ===
A key fundamental theory of Tantric practice is the theory of transformation, which states that negative mental factors such as desire, hatred, greed, pride may be used and transformed as part of the path to liberation. This view can be seen in the Hevajra tantra which states "By passion the world is bound, by passion too it is released" and "one knowing the nature of poison may dispel poison with poison."

Another distinguishing feature of tantric yoga in Tibetan Buddhism is that tantra uses the resultant state of Buddhahood as the path (or in some schools such as Gelug, a similitude of Buddhahood), Thus it is known as the effect vehicle or result vehicle (phalayana) which "brings the effect to the path".

In Tibetan Buddhism, it is generally held that tantric yoga methods are a faster path to the achievement of calm and insight, and can lead to Buddhahood in one lifetime. According to Jamgön Kongtrül, this is because tantra has access to an abundance of "skillful methods in the three trainings and all spheres of experience." Furthermore these methods are free from hardships, such as asceticism and lead to "the mind of great bliss". Thus, according to tantric master Buddhagupta, "due to its swiftness, bliss, and skillful methods, it is said to be superior."

According to the 14th Dalai Lama, the methods of tantra are superior because only tantra makes use of what is called "the Vajrasattva meditative stabilization", which refers to a non-dual consciousness that unites the appearance of the body of a Buddha deity with the realization of emptiness. According to the Dalai Lama, "this composite of method and wisdom—the appearance of a deity empty of true existence, like an illusion—is an affirming negative, an absence of inherent existence as well as a positive appearance."

Tibetan Buddhist tantric practice generally focuses on Unsurpassed Yoga Tantra, which is said to be superior to other "lower" tantric practices. According to the 14th Dalai Lama, this is because only Unsurpassed Yoga Tantra teaches "the extremely subtle fundamental innate mind of clear light." In the Nyingma school, this is also called "essential purity", while in the New Translation Schools it is also called "the completion stage of ultimate clear light."

Tantric yoga is usually divided into two stages, the generation stage (utpattikrama) and the completion stage (nispannakrama). In the generation stage practice of deity yoga (devata-yoga), one dissolves oneself and the world in emptiness and visualizes oneself as a "cherished divinity" (Skt. Iṣṭa-devatā, Tib. yidam). This involves the recitation of mantras, prayers and visualization of the deity along with the associated mandala of the deity. In the completion stage yogas, the visualization of and identification with the deity is dissolved in the realization of luminous emptiness. Various subtle body yogas such as tummo (inner heat) and other techniques such as dream yoga also belong to this stage.

== Classification ==
There are numerous forms of tantric practice, some of which are seen as more advanced and difficult than others. In Tibetan Buddhism, they are classified into different categories (either four or six).

=== Nyingma (Ancient school) ===
The Nyingma school meanwhile, has six main tantra categories instead of four, but their key points are the same as in Sarma. Thus, the great Nyingma scholar Jamgön Ju Mipham Gyatso states, "the entirety of the unsurpassable mantra is alike in that one is first ripened by the four empowerments and then applies the key points of the path of the two stages." Mipham briefly defines the two stages as "the practices of deity and mantra" and "the methods for applying the key points concerning the channels." Regarding the divisions of tantra, Mipham states: "There are two divisions in secret mantra: inner mantra and outer mantra. The first is practiced by means of considering oneself and the practiced deity to be equal and without any difference in terms of quality and identity. The second is practiced by considering oneself and the deity to be different in terms of the relative, both qualitatively and in terms of identity, and receiving the blessing of the deity in one's own stream of being."

The first three categories are the same as in the Sarma classification. Thus, in Mipham's Luminous Essence, a commentary to the Guhyagarbha Tantra, action tantra is explained as relying on more ritual actions and on the blessings of the deity, while yoga tantra is seen as not relying on outer actions and on seeing oneself and the deity as being indistinguishable. Meanwhile, performance tantra is seen as containing both of these inner and outer elements.

Regarding the last three "inner" tantras, Mipham states that here one realizes the unity of oneself and the deity and sees that "all that appears and exists is pure and equal."

The "inner tantras" are:

- Mahāyoga, associated with tantras that emphasize the stage of generation, such as the Guhyagarbha Tantra. This inner tantra is seen as working with "superior relative truth", which refers to "emptiness endowed with all supreme aspects at the time of the fruition", i.e. the pure bodies and wisdoms which are the appearances of the final ultimate.
- Anuyoga is associated with tantras that emphasize the stage of completion. Mipham states that Anuyoga refers to training in the practices that rely on one's "vajra body" (i.e. the subtle body), and the body of another (i.e. sexual yoga), pursuing a path that emphasizes the wisdom of great bliss. They also teach a "principle of instantaneous perfection", which is not found in other tantras. An example of one of these texts is the All-Unifying Pure Presence (Kun ’dus rig pa’i mdo).
- Atiyoga (Dzogchen). In Nyingma, Dzogchen ("Great Perfection") is seen as a non-gradual method that does not make use of the two stages of tantric yoga (Anu and Mahā) and focuses on direct access to the innate purity of things which is introduced by the teacher and then meditated upon. There are numerous tantras and texts associated with this vehicle, such as the Kunjed Gyalpo and the "Seventeen tantras of the esoteric instruction cycle" (man ngag sde'i rgyud bcu bdun).

=== Sarma (New Translation schools) ===
The Sarma, "New Translation" schools of Tibetan Buddhism (Gelug, Sakya, Kagyu, Jonang) classify tantric practices and texts into four categories or "doors" of entry. They are classified according to the capacity of persons who they were taught for, as well as according to the strength of how they use desire and the specific types of methods they employ. This classification represents the main body of tantras in the Kangyur and was accepted by most Indian and Tibetan Sarma masters. The four classes of tantra are:

- Kriya yoga (Tib. bya ba, Action yoga) – These were taught for practitioners of lower ability who have an inclination for performing many external ritual activities. The level of desire they use is said to be similar to a couple laughing together. It includes various practices for deities such as Medicine Buddha, "the eleven faced" Chenrezig and Vajrapani. In action tantra, there are numerous ritual actions to be done before the yogi sits to meditate. These involve the use of mudras and mantras in various acts of purification and protection such as ritual bathing, the sprinkling of scented water and the creation of a circle of protection. There are also various prescriptions dealing with eating, drinking, and clothing. According to Kongtrül, in Kriya Yoga, one relates to the deity as a subject relates to their lord and only meditates on an external deity (not on oneself as being the deity).
- Charya yoga (spyod pa, Performance yoga) – Meant for practitioners of middle ability. According to Tsongkhapa, it is for "those who balance external activities and internal meditative stabilization without relying on very many activities." The level of desire they use is said to be similar to a couple gazing into each other's eyes. It includes practice lineages for the Mahāvairocana Tantra, for the Vajrapāṇi Initiation Tantra and for Manjughosha. According to Kongtrul, in this type of practice, "the deity is like a sibling or friend."
- Yoga tantra (rnal’byor) – Meant for practitioners of high ability who "mainly rely on meditative stabilization and rely on only few external activities." The level of desire they use is said to be similar to a couple holding hands or embracing. Yoga refers to the union or yoking of method and wisdom. One sees one's body, speech and mind as inseparably united with those of the deity. Some Vajrasattva practices fall under this category, as well as the Tattvasaṃgraha Tantra and the Vajraśekhara Tantra.
- Anuttara yoga tantra (rnal ’byor bla med, Unexcelled or Highest Yoga) – Meant for practitioners of the highest ability who do not rely on external activities. It uses the highest level of desire, sexual union and is thus also designated the "tantra of union of the two". It is also distinguished in that in some cases, an actual person can act as one's consort. This category includes all the "Yogini" type tantras (also known as "father & mother") in which one finds fierce deities in sexual union, including Kālacakra, Hevajra, Cakrasaṃvara, Guhyasamāja, etc. According to Kongtrül, only Highest Yoga includes both the generation and completion phases. Kongtrül also states that this is the type of practice most emphasized in the Himalayan regions.

Deity yoga (Wylie: lha'i rnal 'byor; Sanskrit: devata-yoga) is the main method in Buddhist tantra and it is found in all four classes of tantra. It relies on the imagination to visualize a Buddhist deity (usually a Buddha). In Action, Performance and Yoga Tantra (known as "the lower tantras"), practice is divided into yoga with signs (where the focus is on the deity's appearance and emptiness) and yoga without signs (which is mainly concerned with meditation on emptiness). Meanwhile, in the higher yogas of Anuttarayogatantra, practice is divided into two stages, the generation stage and the completion stage.

== Preliminaries and requirements ==
In Tibetan Buddhism, it is generally held that one practices common Mahayana first, that is to say, the bodhisattva's six perfections, before practicing tantra. Furthermore, according to Tsongkhapa, since Vajrayana is also a part of Mahayana, one does not abandon the Mahayana practice of the perfections, but continues to practice these alongside tantra. Jamgön Kongtrül states that ordinary individuals first must train in the Mahayana and only exceptional individuals can begin their spiritual path with tantra. Kongtrül also states that those entering into tantra must possess inalienable faith in the Vajrayana, as well as great diligence in study, reflection and meditation driven by the wish to reach awakening in this life.

=== Preliminary practices ===
All schools of Tibetan Buddhism teach various preliminary or foundational practices called ngöndro. These are supposed to prepare the student for tantric practice. There are two main types of preliminary practices, common (or outer) and uncommon (or inner) preliminaries. Common preliminaries are practices which are shared with non-tantric Buddhism. These include taking refuge in the three jewels, the cultivation of love (maitrī), compassion (karuṇā) and "bodhicitta" (the mind which seeks awakening in order to help others), and the "four thoughts that turn the mind" (the preciousness of human birth, suffering, karma and impermanence).

Uncommon preliminaries include tantric elements, such as mantras and visualization practices or are done specifically to prepare for tantra. Uncommon preliminaries include the practice of Vajrasattva purification, Mandala offerings, and Guru Yoga.

=== Empowerment ===
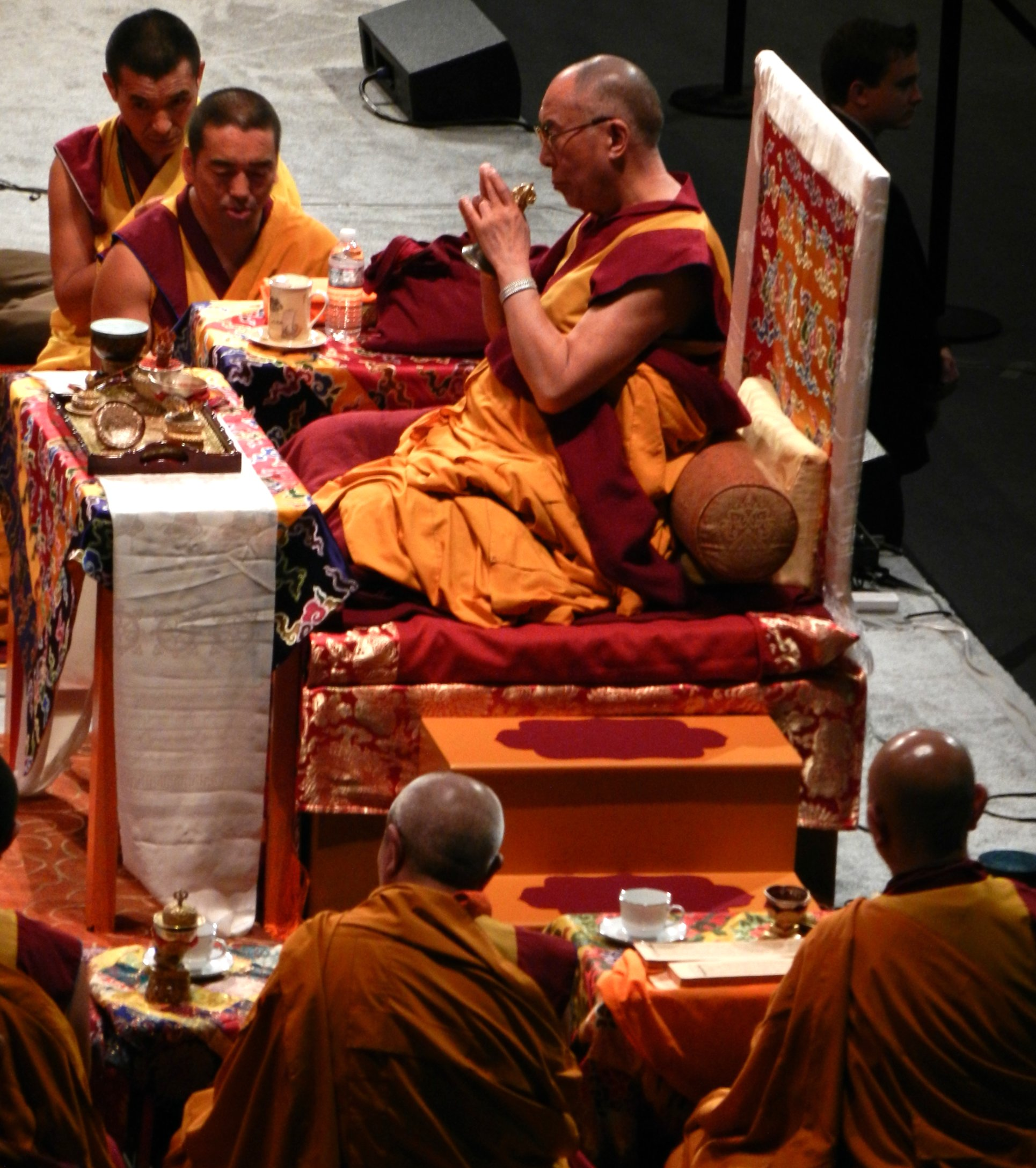
His Holiness the 14th Dalai Lama holds a vajra offering mudra while preparing the Kalachakra mandala during a Kalachakra initiation ceremony in Washington D.C., US

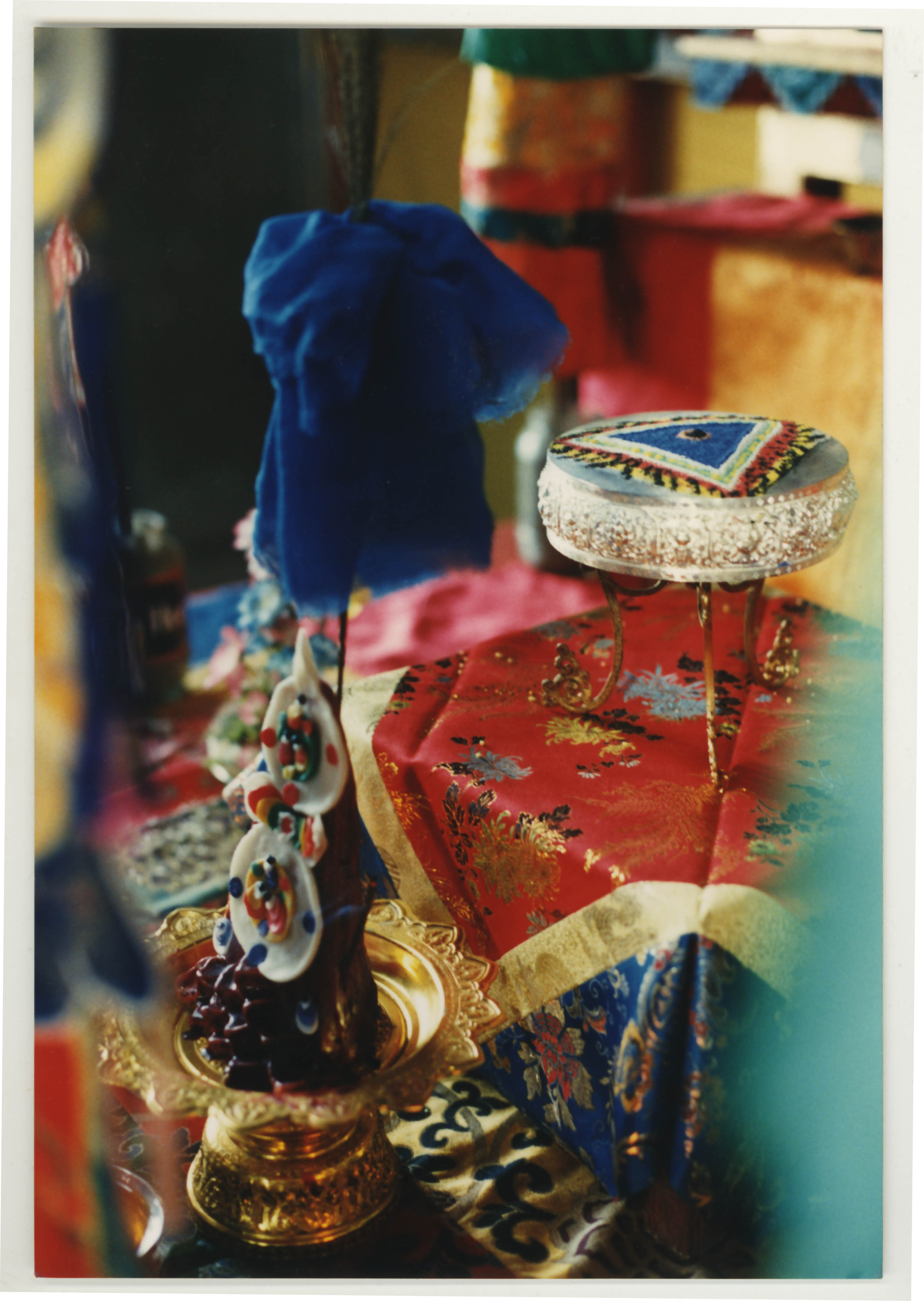
A torma and mandala offering for a Vajrakilaya empowerment ceremony

To practice tantric yoga, it is considered necessary to receive a tantric empowerment or initiation (Skt. abhiṣeka; Tib. wang) from a qualified tantric master (Vajracarya, "vajra master"). The Sanskrit term abhiṣeka refers to ritual bathing or anointing. Mipham states that empowerment produces the view of mantra in one's being and that this is the basis for the practice of Vajrayana. According to Mipham,

empowerment is the indispensable initial entry point for the practice of mantra. The reason for this is that the profound empowerment ritual produces a sudden manifestation of the ground maṇḍala that dwells primordially within oneself. This refers to the indivisible truths of purity and equality, which are very difficult to realize.

Kongtrül defines initiation as "what makes the [student's] mind fully ripened by planting the special seeds of the resultant four dimensions of awakening in the aggregates, elements, and sense fields of the recipient." It is also associated with the conferral of authority, in this case, someone is authorized to cultivate the tantric path.

Initiation includes introducing the student to a specific mandala (which may be made from flowers, colored powders, grains, paint and a mental mandala). One is not allowed to practice tantra without having received the particular initiation. Some simpler mantra methods, such as reciting the mani mantra, are open to all however.

Traditionally, there are technically three requirements before a student may begin a tantric practice:

1. The ritual initiation
2. A reading of the text by an authorized holder of the practice (Tib. lung)
3. The oral instruction (tri) on how to perform the practice

In Unsurpassed Yoga Tantra, the ritual procedure generally includes four "wangs" (though it may include more, depending on the system):

1. The Vase (bumpa) Empowerment, which is for purification. The vase empowerment symbolizes purification of the body, senses, and world into the emanation body (nirmanakaya) of the deity and may include a vase filled with water.
2. The Secret Empowerment, which involves receiving the nectar of the bodhichitta [white and red vital essences] from the union of the vajra master and his consort (either real or imagined) which causes great bliss. According to Mipham, "the secret empowerment purifies the speech and energies into the enjoyment body" (sambhogakaya).
3. The Knowledge-Wisdom (prajña-jñana) Empowerment, which involves uniting with a consort—real or imagined—who is visualized as a deity, giving rise to inner heat (tummo) and the experience of the "four blisses" and innate pristine awareness. Mipham states that this empowerment "purifies the mind and the essences into the dharma body."
4. The Word Empowerment, which involves the pointing out of ultimate reality, emptiness, or pristine awareness based on the previous experience of the third empowerment. According to Mipham, it purifies the three bodies into the essence body.

=== Samaya ===
After receiving initiation into a tantric practice, one will receive certain tantric pledges or vows, called samaya. These must be kept in order for the practice to be effective. According to the 14th Dalai Lama, "one must properly maintain the correct view of emptiness and the altruistic mind of enlightenment, not losing these even for the sake of one's life. These are again and again said to be the root of the vows and pledges." According to Tsongkhapa, tantric pledges are only conferred for Yoga Tantra or Highest Yoga Tantra initiates, for the other types of tantric practice, only the bodhisattva vows are necessary.

Secrecy is often a cornerstone of tantric Buddhist samaya. It traditionally forbidden to reveal any knowledge of tantric symbols and practice to the uninitiated, which can easily lead to misunderstanding and dismissal by those who have not been initiated.

This secrecy is meant to avoid the harm which may arise by practicing without proper guidance. Tantric practice relies on oral transmissions and instructions given personally from teacher to student. They are kept secret because they demand a certain maturity on the part of the student. Otherwise they may have a negative effect on the student and on others. Such teachings describe certain meditative states and how to attain them, as well as how to work with the defilements on the path and how to use the subtle body in meditation. The 14th Dalai Lama states:

The Secret Mantra Vehicle is hidden because it is not appropriate for the minds of many persons. Practices for achieving activities of pacification, increase, control, and fierceness, which are not even presented in the Perfection Vehicle, are taught in the Mantra Vehicle but in hiding because those with impure motivation would harm both themselves and others by engaging in them. If one's mental continuum has not been ripened by the practices common to both Sūtra and Tantra Great Vehicle—realization of suffering, impermanence, refuge, love, compassion, altruistic mind-generation, and emptiness of inherent existence—practice of the Mantra Vehicle can be ruinous through assuming an advanced practice inappropriate to one's capacity. Therefore, its open dissemination is prohibited; practitioners must maintain secrecy from those who are not vessels of this path.

=== Guru yoga ===
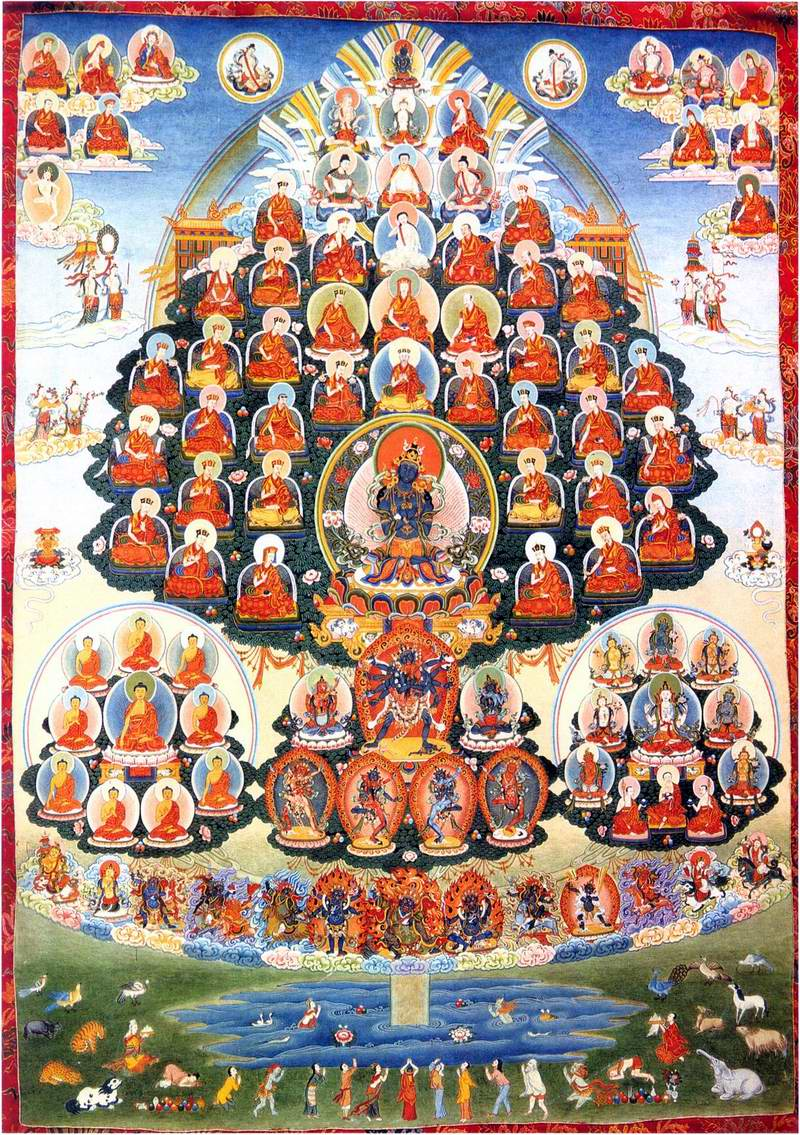
Thangka depicting the Refuge Tree of the Karma Kagyu Lineage by Sherab Palden Beru, c. 1972

In Tibetan Buddhism, a guru or lama (spiritual teacher) is seen as an essential guide during tantric practice. Without the guru's example, blessings (or "inspiration") and guidance, genuine progress in tantra is held to be impossible for all but the most keen and gifted.

Guru yoga (or 'teacher practice'; Tib: bla ma'i rnal 'byor) is a practice that has many variations, but may be understood as a tantric devotional process where the practitioner unites their mindstream with the mindstream of the guru's Body, Speech and Mind. Guru yoga is akin to Deity yoga since the guru (which could be a Buddha, a historical figure like Padmasambhava or a living person) is visualized like a meditational deity. The process of guru yoga may entail visualization of a refuge tree as an invocation of the lineage, with the root guru channeling the blessings of the refuge tree (and thus the entire lineage) to the practitioner. It might also just involve visualization of the guru above the meditator, in front of them or in their heart. Guru yoga may also entail a liturgy, prayer or mantra, such as the Seven Line Prayer of Padmasambhava, or the Migtsema (a Prayer to Lama Tsongkhapa).

== Main practice: Deity yoga ==
=== In the lower tantras ===
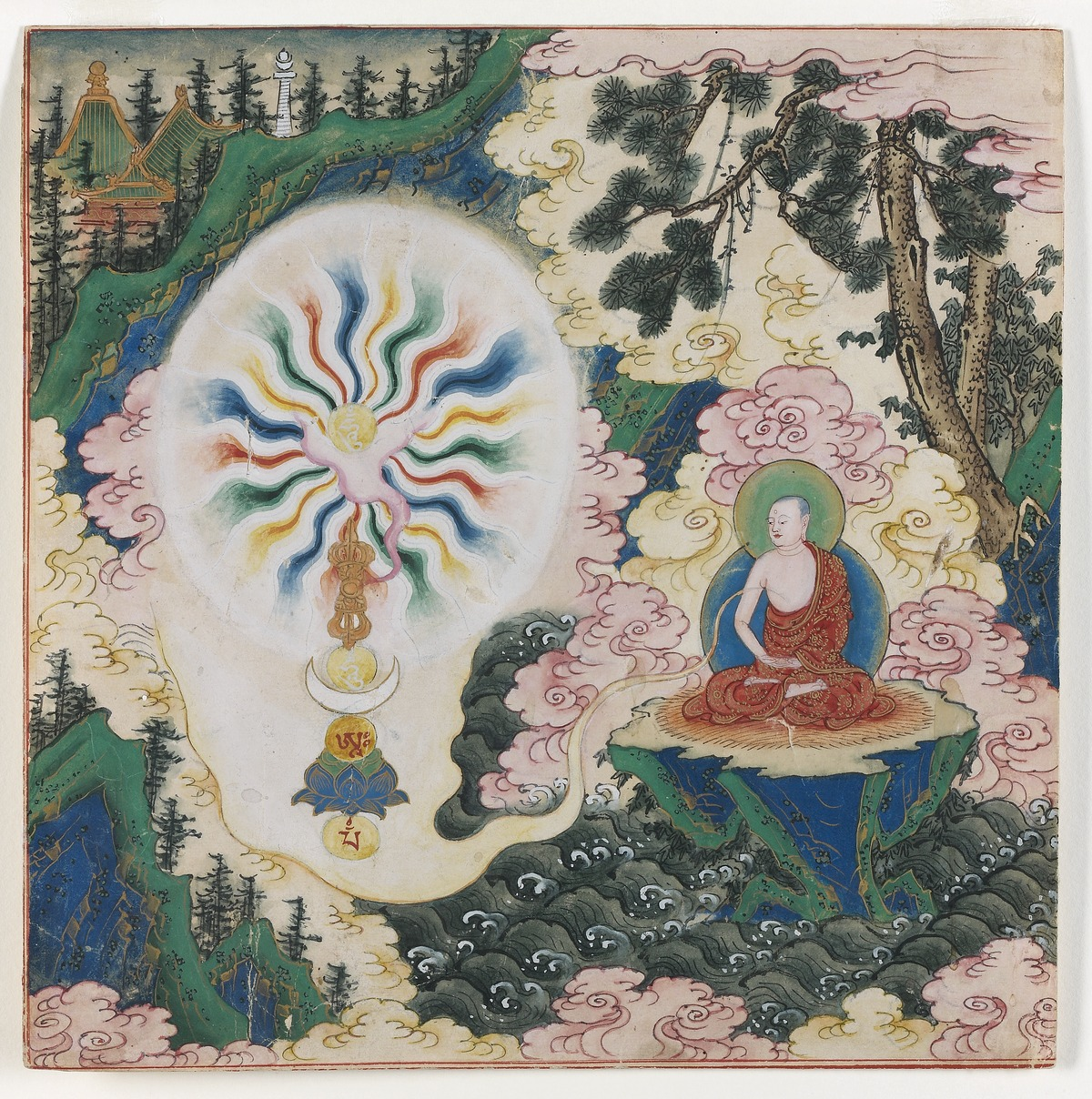
An 18th century Mongolian miniature which depicts the generation of the Vairocana Mandala

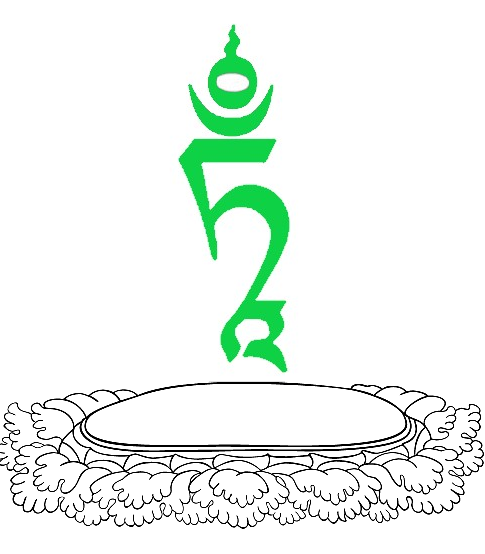
TAM the seed syllable (bija) of the deity Green Tara. In some practices, one first visualizes the seed syllable, and the deity arises out of this.

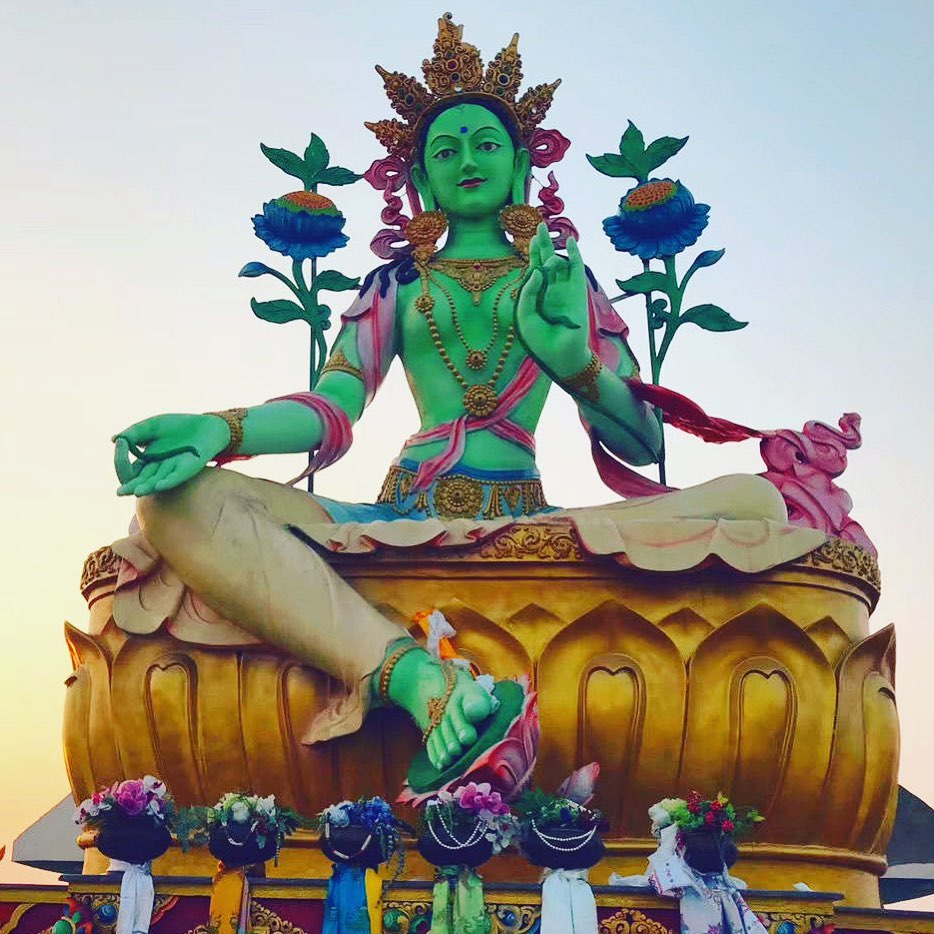
A statue of Green Tara, a common meditation deity in Tibetan Buddhism

Deity yoga is the central practice of Buddhist Tantra. In the three lower or "outer" tantras (Action, Performance and Yoga), Deity yoga practice is often divided into "the yoga with signs", and "the yoga without signs".

Deity yoga engages creative visualization as a skillful means of personal transformation through which the practitioner (sadhaka) visualizes a chosen deity (yidam) as part of a mandala or refuge tree in order transform their experience of the appearance aspect of reality. As the 14th Dalai Lama says, "In brief, the body of a Buddha is attained through meditating on it".

=== In the higher tantras ===
==== Generation stage ====
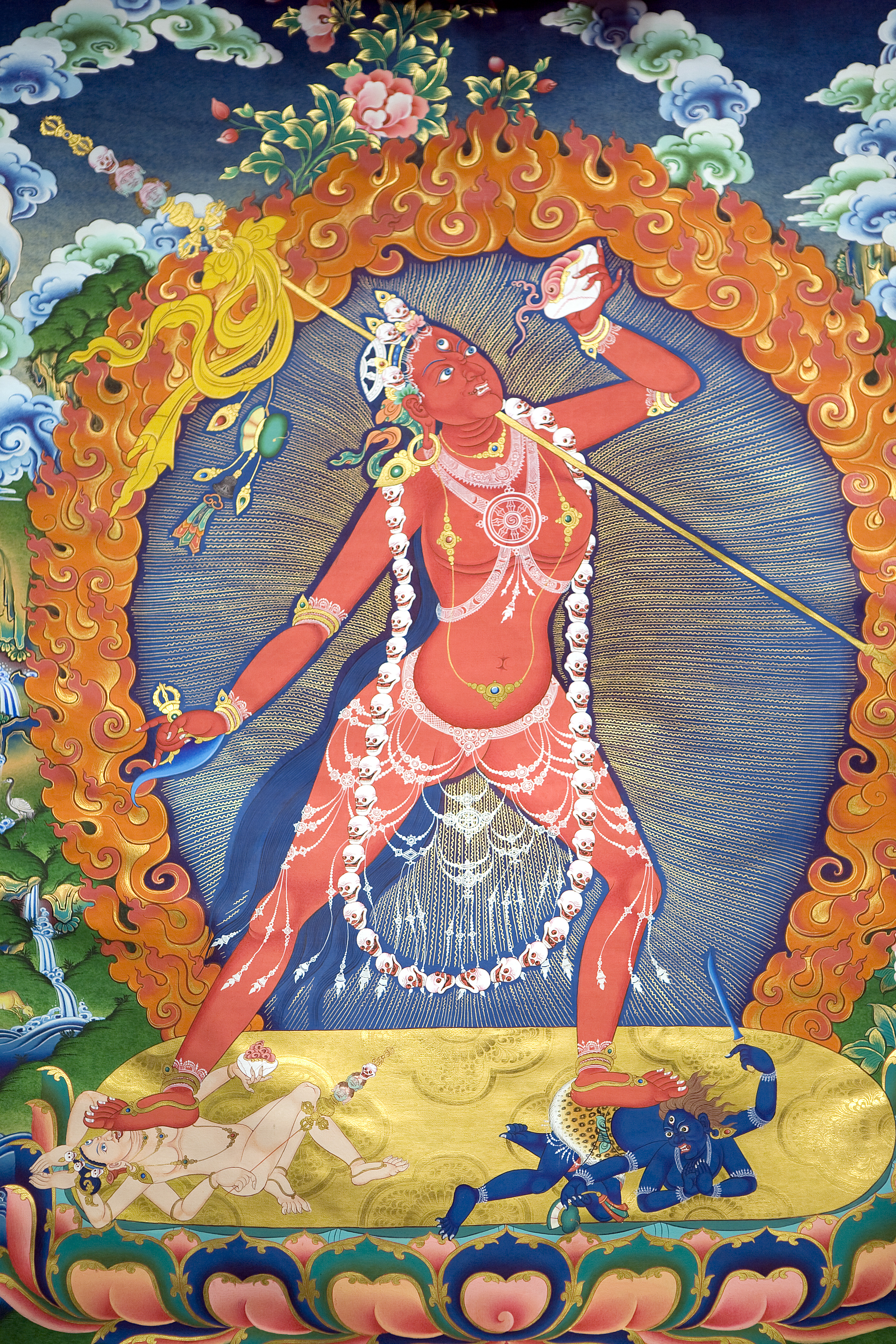
Painting of Vajrayoginī (Dorjé Neljorma), a female Buddha and a ḍākiṇī used as a meditation deity in Highest Yoga Tantra

The generation stage or creation phase (Tib. bskyed rim; Skt. utpatti-krama), also known as "the phase of imagination" and "the yoga of fabrications", is the first phase of tantric deity yoga in the Unsurpassed Yoga Tantra of the later schools of Tibetan Buddhism. It also equates to the Mahayoga of the Nyingma school. Kongtrül states that this phase is associated with the body and the birth process (while the Completion phase is associated with the mind and with dissolution at death).

==== Completion stage ====
The completion stage (rdzogs rim, also "perfection" or "fulfillment" stage), also known as "the yoga of the natural state", is the second stage of Unsurpassed Yoga Tantra. According to Kongtrül the Sanskrit equivalent to rdzogs is niṣpanna, "meaning the ultimately true, or the natural state. "Completion" therefore denotes what is ultimately true, the natural state, or the nature of things."

=== List of Tantric deity practices ===
Representations of tantric deities, such as a statues, paintings (Tibetan: thangka), or mandalas, are often employed as an aid to visualization. Mandalas are symbolic representations of pure divine spaces, of the sacred architecture that house the deity.

In Tibetan Buddhism, there are numerous tantric deities used in tantric yoga, which are either male or female as well as peaceful, fierce or semi-fierce. The outer or lower tantras generally focus on peaceful deities. Some of the main peaceful deities (which may be Buddhas or high level Bodhisattvas) include:

- Akṣobhya
- Amitābha
- Bhaiṣajyaguru (Medicine Buddha)
- Avalokiteśvara (Chenrezig)
- Tārā
- Mañjuśrī
- Prajñāpāramitā
- Sakyamuni
- Vairocana
- Padmasambhava
- Yeshe Tsogyal

The deities from the Highest Yoga Tantras are often fierce looking and are also depicted in union with a consort, they include:

- Mahākāla
- Hayagrīva
- Guhyasamāja
- Garuda
- Ganapati
- Heruka
- Guhyasamāja
- Cakrasaṃvara
- Yamāntaka
- Rakta Yamari
- Kālacakra
- Hevajra
- Vajrabhairava
- Vajrakīlaya
- Vajrapāṇi
- Vajrayoginī
- Vajravarāhi
- Kurukullā
- Ekajaṭī

== See also ==
- Buddhist meditation
- Kashmir Shaivism
- Shingon Buddhism
- Taoist meditation
- Tukdam
