= Khenpo Shenga =

Tibetan Buddhist scholar (1871–1927)

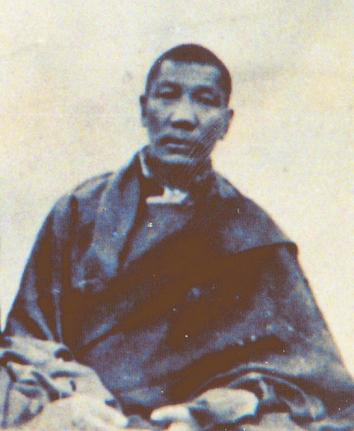
Shenpen Chökyi Nangwa

Khenpo Shenga Rinpoche, also Shenpen Chökyi Nangwa (1871–1927) was a Tibetan scholar in the Nyingma and Sakya traditions of Tibetan Buddhism.

== Life ==
Khenpo Shenga he undertook religious study at a relatively young age under the tutelage of Önpo Tenzin Norbu. Eventually he was recognized as an incarnation of that lama's uncle, a scholar named Gyalsé Shenphen Thayé. Upon the death of his guru, he remained at Gemang hermitage until 1902 when he was invited by the fifth Dzogchen Rinpoche, Thubten Chökyi Dorje, to teach at the Shri Singha Shedra at Dzogchen Monastery. His skill as a scholar soon burnished his reputation and attracted many students.

From Dzogchen he went to Palpung monastery at the behest of Tai Situ Rinpoche, where he composed his best known works and established a shedra. A few years later he was invited by Jamyang Khyentse Chökyi Lodrö to become the first khenpo of the new shedra at Dzongsar Monastery, inaugurated in 1918. He later founded another shedra at the Sakya monastery of Kyegön Döndrub Ling.

== Legacy ==
Khenpo Shenga is remembered for his annotated commentaries on the thirteen primary texts of the Nyingma shedra curriculum, which are now the standard. He did much to revitalize scholarship in the Rime movement spirit of returning to Indian textual sources. He also taught a number of lamas who would become illustrious in their own rights.

== See also ==
- Dzongsar Khyentse Chökyi Lodrö
- Dzongsar Monastery
