= Wangdrak Rinpoche =

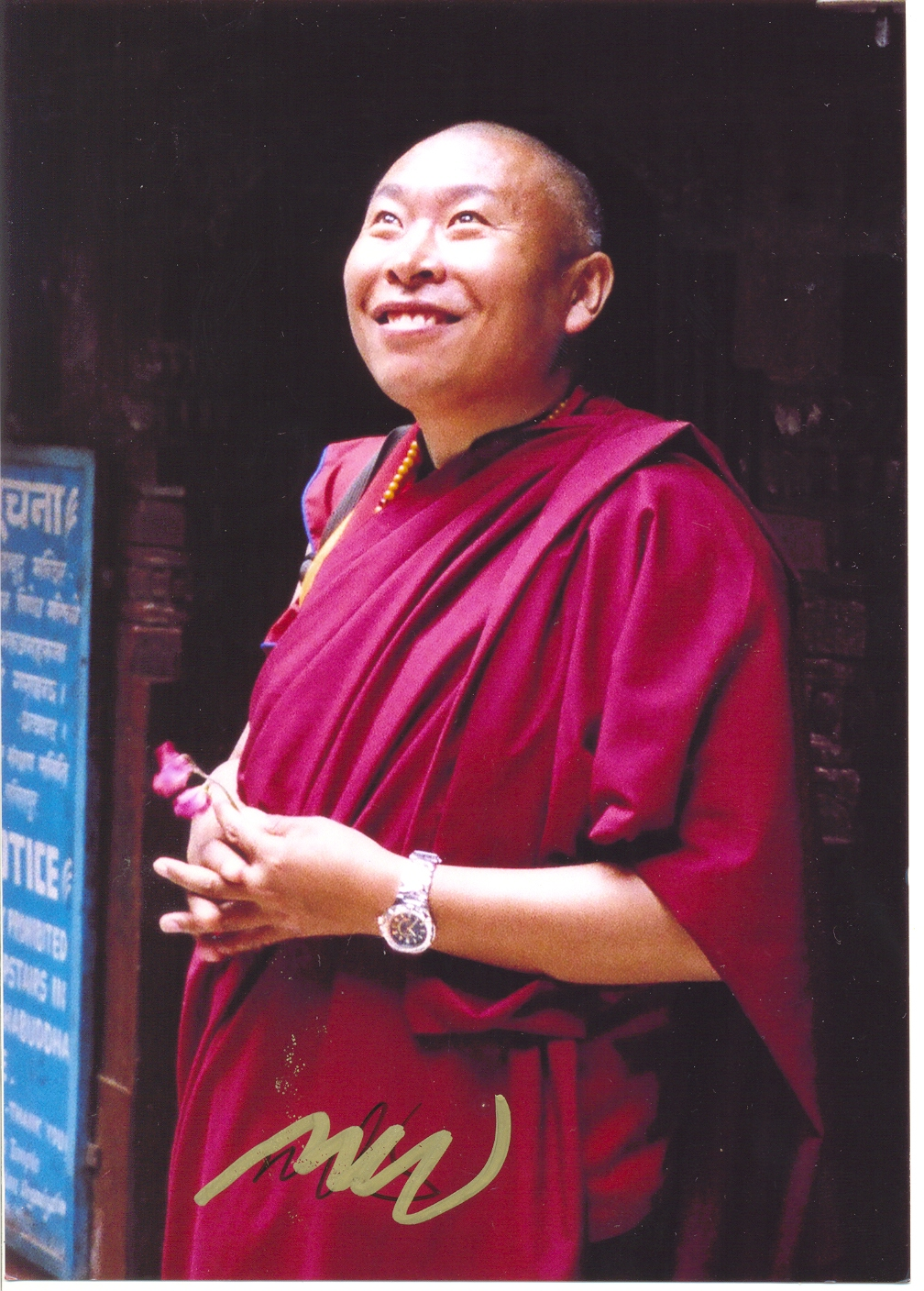

Personal life
- Education: Dzongsar College

Religious life
- Religion: Buddhism

Senior posting
- Reincarnation: Wangdrak Dorje

Wangdrak Rinpoche (born 1967) is a lama of Gebchak Nunnery (i.e. Gebchak Gonpa), in Nangchen, Yushu Prefecture, Qinghai Province (Eastern Tibet). He is a khenpo from Dzongsar College in Dergé who now works full-time for the Gebchak nuns' material well-being and the preservation of their Vajrayāna tradition of spiritual training.

Wangdrak Rinpoche is the third reincarnation of Wangdrak Dorje. Along with the first Tsangyang Gyatso Rinpoche, Wangdrak Dorje was instrumental in spreading the practices and teachings of the Gebchak tradition and was renowned for his total mastery of the profound practices of tsa-lung (nāḍī and prāṇa yoga).

The present incarnation received a khenpo degree from Dzongsar College, well known as the best college in all of Tibet for non-sectarian scriptural study. He has also received a remarkably broad training in the practices and rituals of the Nyingma, Sakya and Kagyu traditions.

After completing his studies and several years of teaching in monasteries, Wangdrak Rinpoche was requested by Tsoknyi Rinpoche and the Gebchak nuns' to accept formal responsibility for overseeing the nunnery's needs. Along with and as a part of this, he teaches students in Singapore, Australia and other countries on Gebchak's meditations and experiential understandings, and occasionally hosts summer retreats for foreign students in Nangchen.
