= Mingyur Namkhé Dorje, 4th Dzogchen Rinpoche =

Mingyur Namkhé Dorje (Tibetan: མི་འགྱུར་ནམ་མཁའི་རྡོ་རྗེ་, Wylie: mi 'gyur nam mkha'i rdo rje) (born 1793) was the Fourth Dzogchen Rinpoche of Tibet.

In 1842 an earthquake hit Tibet and Dorje was responsible for implementing much of the reconstruction of the Dzogchen Monastery. He worked with one of his main disciples, the scholar Gyalse Shenpen Thaye. They established the Shri Singha monastic scripture college, or shedra, which later became influential in Nyingma sect of Tibetan Buddhism.
