= Refuge tree =

Tibetan Buddhist imagery

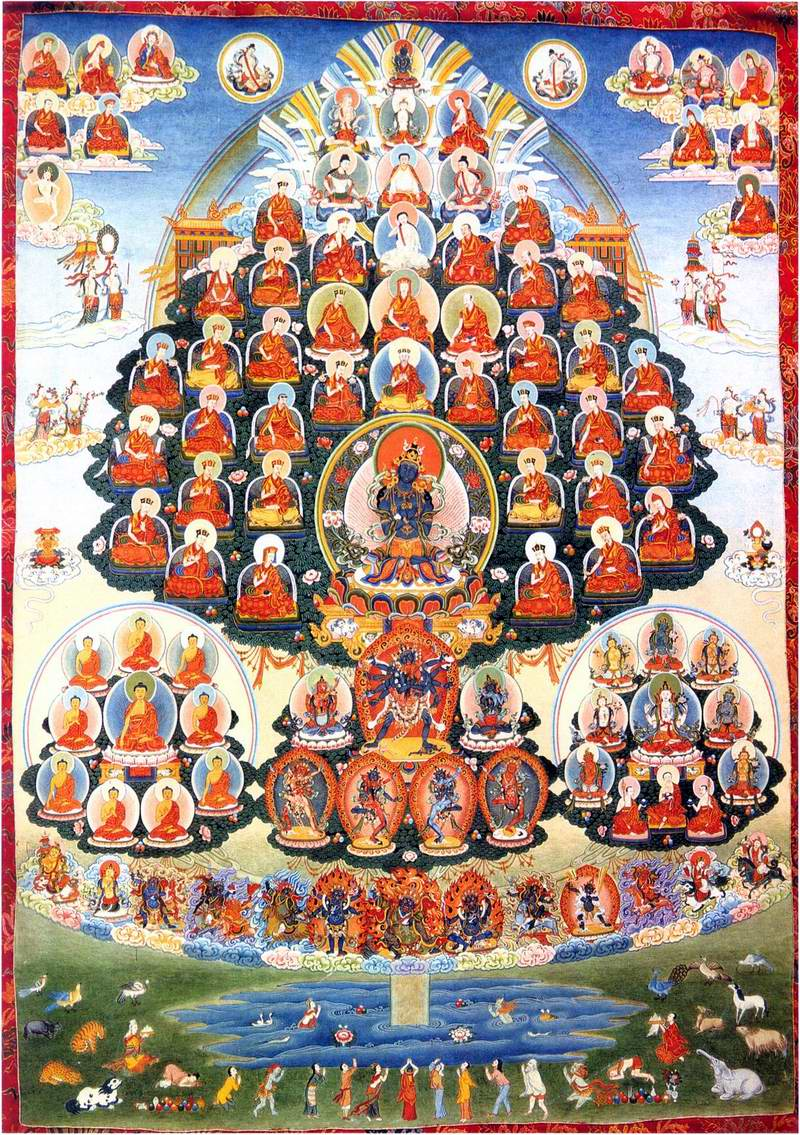
Thangka depicting the Refuge Tree of the Karma Kagyu Lineage by Sherab Palden Beru, c. 1972

The imagery of the Refuge Tree, also referred to as Refuge Assembly, Refuge Field, Merit Field, Field of Merit or Field of Accumulation (Tibetan: ཚོགས་ཞིང་།, Wylie: tshogs zhing) is a key part of a visualization and ngöndro practice common to Vajrayana Buddhism. Based on descriptions in the liturgical texts of various traditions, Refuge Trees are often depicted in thangkas employed as objects of veneration, mnemonic devices and as a precursor to the contents being fully visualized by the Buddhist practitioner during the Refuge Formula or evocation.

While the concept of Refuge Trees appears in liturgical texts at least as early as the 16th century, based on known examples Refuge Tree paintings appear to have only become popular from the 18th century making them a late development in the history of Tibetan art.

== Content ==
A symbol representing the Three Jewels

Refuge Tree or Refuge Field paintings depict the important objects of "Refuge" for each sect or lineage in the form of a genealogical chart. Each lineage has its own distinctive form of composition but they usually include the "Three Jewels" (Sanskrit: triratna): Buddha, Dharma and Sangha, the "Refuges" common to all major schools of Buddhism. They may also include what is known in the Nyingma and Kagyu sects as the "Three Roots" (Tibetan: tsa sum) which include the numerous important Lamas and Lineage Holders, particular meditational deities (Tibetan: Yidam), the Dakinis (Tibetan: Khadroma) or the Protectors of the Lineage (Sanskrit: Dharmapāla, Tibetan: Chokyong). Many other figures such as Buddhist practitioners, animals, offering goddesses and other Buddhist symbols and imagery are also often included. A Refuge Tree painting may contain over a hundred figures, or only the key representative figures of each main grouping.

A key function of a Refuge Tree painting is to depict the transmission lineage of the particular sect or tradition. As David P. Jackson & Janice Jackson stated in Tibetan Thangka Painting, "For the religious practitioner these paintings embodied the whole lineage through which the tradition descended, from its ultimate origin down to the practitioner's own teacher". The Jacksons go on to explain that the practitioner imagines the main central figure of the Refuge Tree (the identity of which depends on the particular tradition) as the essence of one's main teacher or Root Lama.

== Structures and compositions ==
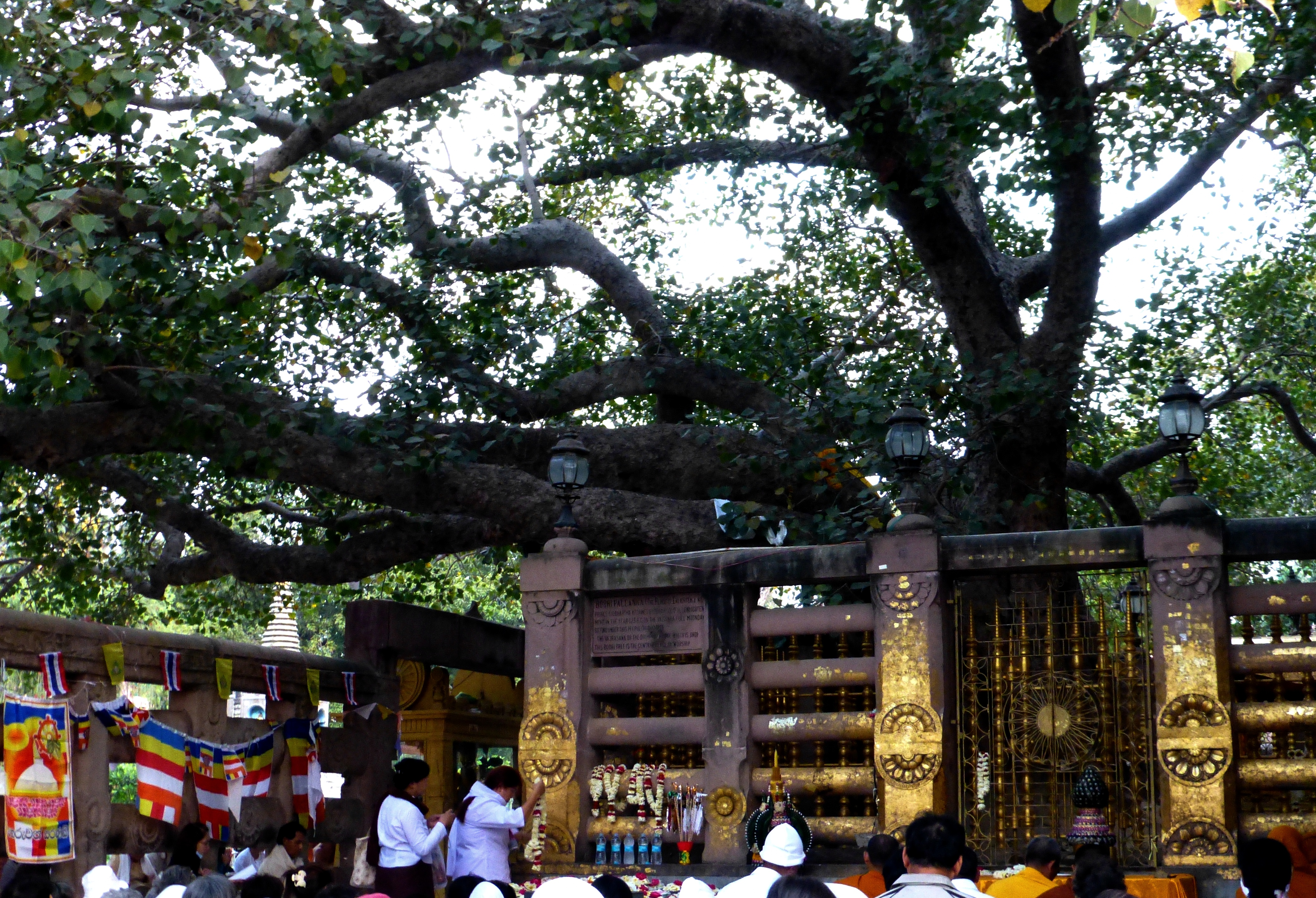
Bodhi Tree at the Mahabodhi Temple, Bodhgaya

The structures of the compositions symbolize the interconnectedness of the various figures and groupings. The figures of "Refuge" are depicted within the form of a tree diagram usually supported by three main structures: the branches of a stylised tree, a palace, or lotus flower and lion throne. The support depends on the lineage and the liturgical text the painting is based on.

When the support is a tree, it is often referred to as a "wish-fulfilling tree" (Wylie: dpag bsam gyi shing). In A Shrine for Tibet, Marylin M. Rhie and Robert A. F. Thurman assert that the depiction of the Refuge Assembly in the form of a tree "developed from the ancient tradition of the Buddha being born under an ashoka tree, attaining enlightenment under a pipal or Bodhi Tree, and passing away from his coarse material body under two sal trees".

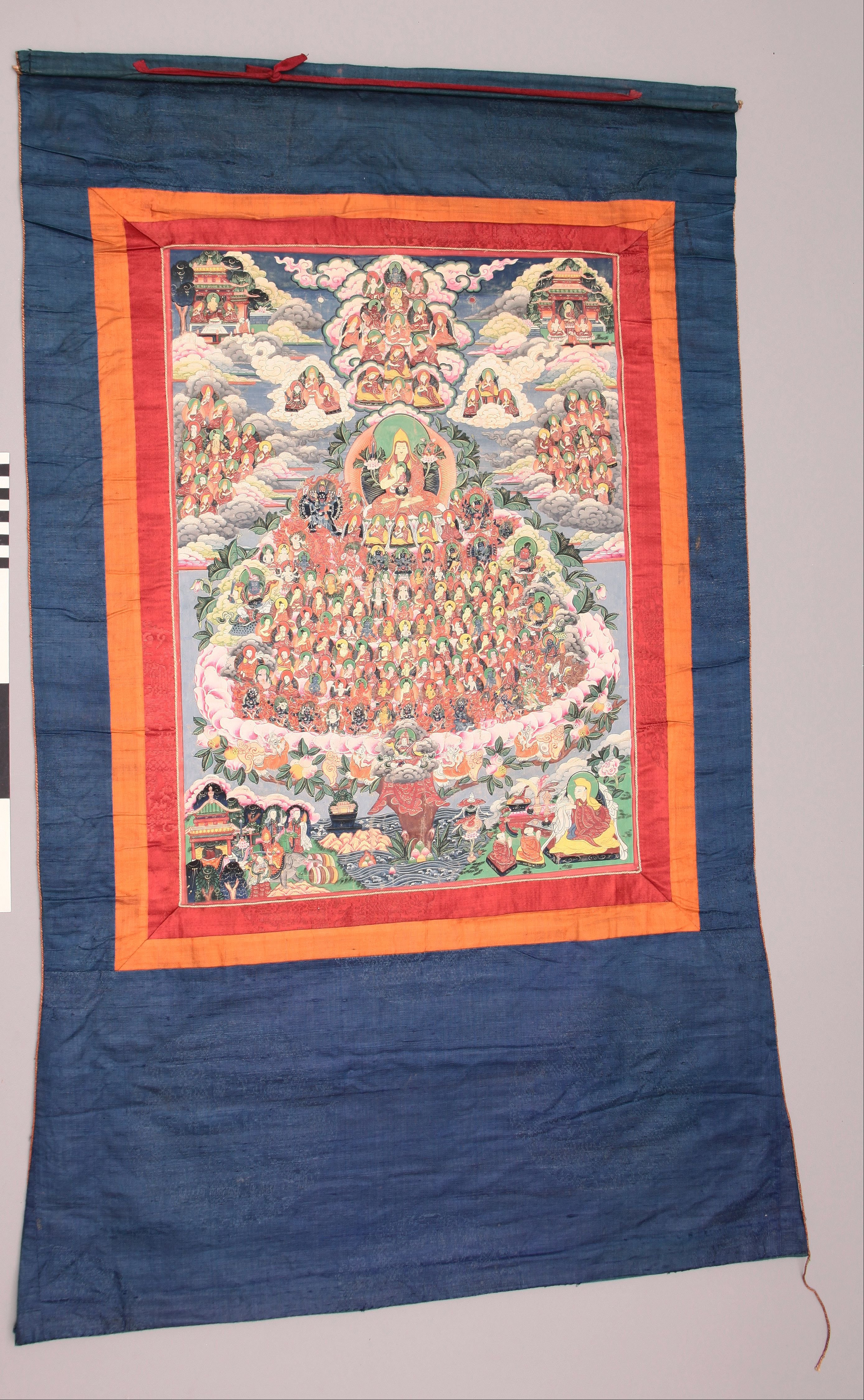
Gelug Lineage Refuge Tree thangka depicting Je Tsongkapa at the pinnacle of the tree

=== Four main schools of Tibetan Buddhism ===
==== Gelug ====
The configuration of the earliest known Refuge Tree paintings appear to be based on the 17th century Lama Chopa text by the 1st Panchen Lama, Khedrup Gelek Pelzang of the Gelug Tradition. In this text, he described the Field of Accumulation in a configuration on the peak of a tree with Shakyamuni Buddha representing the Root Lama as the main figure. Later Gelug paintings also feature the founder of the Gelug sect, Je Tsongkapa as the central figure. In both cases, as Jackson and Jackson describe, the central figure is at the pinnacle of the tree "surrounded by descending concentric rows of exalted beings". These rows consist of eight classes of beings: Gurus, Yidams, Buddhas, Bodhisattvas, Pratyekabuddhas, Sravakas and Sthaviras, Dakas, and Dharmapalas. A popular Gelug structure of the Refuge Tree composition also includes three separate assemblies of teachers above the main figure. In this case, according to Jackson and Jackson:

the teaching lineage of the tantric empowerments and practices constitute[s] the central group. On the main figure's right there [is] the "Lineage of the Vast Conduct", the lineage of the Yogacara Mahayana descending from Maitreyanatha and Asanga. On the other side [is] the "Lineage of the Profound View", the Madhyamaka tradition coming down through Manjusri and Nagarjuna.

==== Karma Kagyu ====
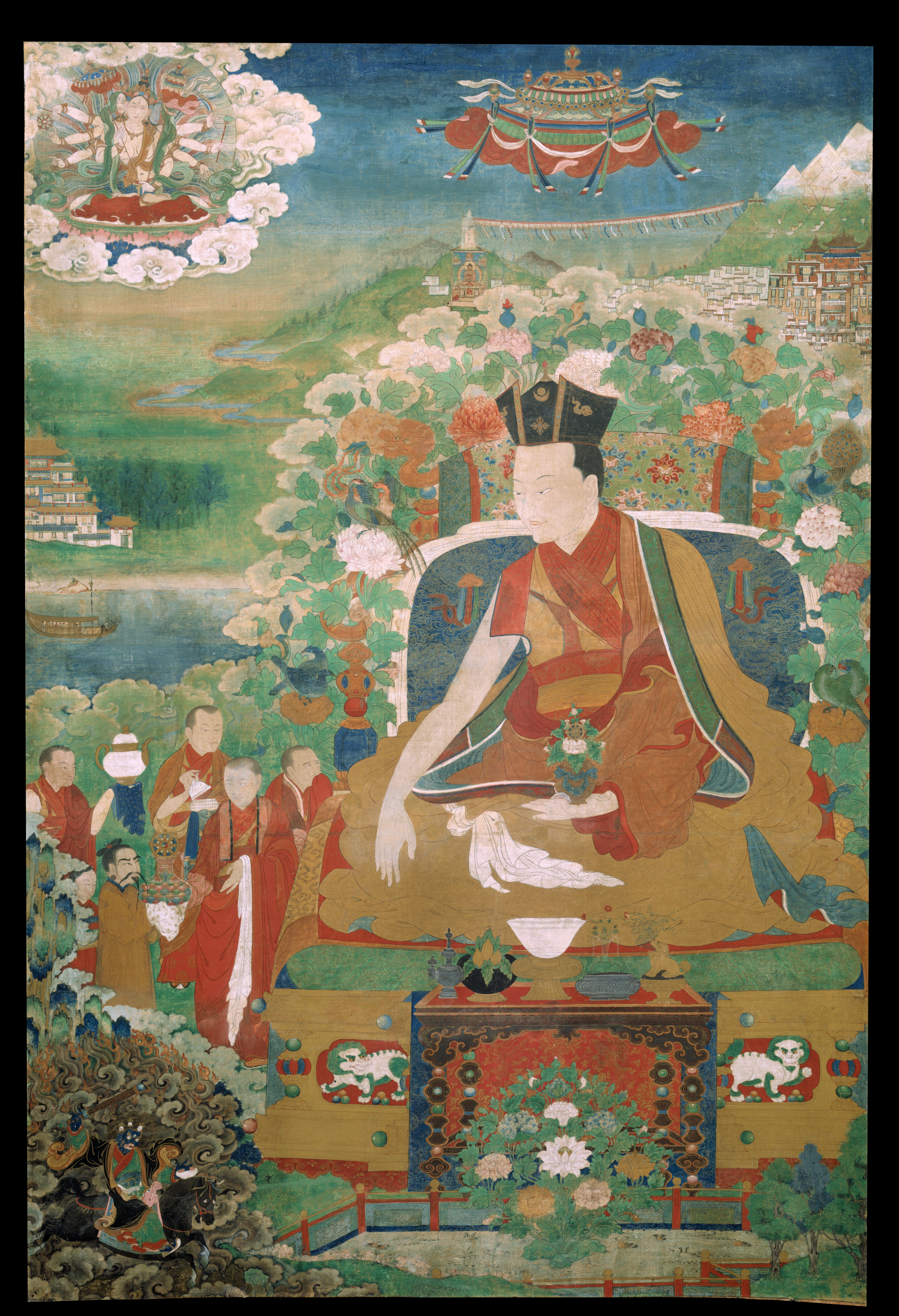
Thangka depicting the 9th Karmapa, Wangchug Dorje (1555-1603)

The Karma Kagyu sect of Tibetan Buddhism developed another form of tree structure for their objects of "Refuge". The Karma Kagyu Refuge Field was described in the form of a five-branched tree by 9th Karmapa, Wangchug Dorje in his 16th-century texts Lhancig Kyejor Tri (Wylie: lhan cig skyes sbyor khrid) and Paglam Dropa’I Shingta (Wylie: ‘phags lam bgrod pa’I shing rta). Based on known examples of Karma Kagyu Refuge Trees, it appears that the type of composition became popular in the sect only after Jamgon Kongtrul wrote the 19th century text, Ngedon Dronme (Wylie: nges don sgron me, English: The Torch of Certainty) a commentary on the 9th Karmapa's texts. In summary, these texts describe the following:

A golden tree trunk grows out of a beautiful lake. In the centre is Vajradhara (Tibetan: Dorje Chang) as Root Lama surrounded by the Kagyu Lamas. On the other four main branches that radiate towards the four cardinal directions are: the Yidams on the front branch; to the left are the Buddhas of past, present and future and the ten directions; on the rear branch are their teachings represented by a stack of sacred scriptures or pechas; to the right is the Sangha represented by Bodhisattvas and monks; beneath the Lamas are all the Dharmapalas surrounded by their helpers.

==== Nyingma ====
The earliest known paintings of Nyingma Refuge Trees appear to be from the 19th century and are based on the description from the Longchen Nyingtig preliminary practices as explained in The Words of My Perfect Teacher by Patrul Rinpoche. While other structures have since developed, Nyingma Refuge Trees compositions generally consist of a five branch structure.

In summary the text describes the following: Vajradhara of Oddiyana is in union with the white dakini Yeshe Tsogyal in the centre; the Lineage Lamas are above; on the branch in front are the Buddhas of past, present and future and the ten directions; on the right are the Eight Great Bodhisattvas; on the left branch are the Sravakas and Pratyekabuddhas; on the branch at the rear are the teachings; and beneath are the Protectors of the Lineage.

==== Sakya ====
Based on known examples, it appears that Sakya Refuge Tree paintings are a 20th-century concept as few examples exist pre 1956. The Sakya sect does not appear to have a standard composition for depicting the contents of their "Refuge". However, the 20th century text The Excellent Path of the Two Accumulations by Dezhung Rinpoche contains a description of the Sakya Refuge. In summary it describes: a four-petalled lotus upon a wish-fulfilling tree, in the centre of which is the Root Lama as Vajradhara with the Lineage Lamas in front; on the front petal are Yidams of the four Tantras; on the left petal are the Buddhas; on the petal behind are the Buddhist scriptures; on right petal are the Bodhisattvas; and surrounding are countless other forms of "Refuge" filling the sky.

== See also ==
- Ashtamangala
- Dharma transmission
- Indra's net
- Parampara
- Vidyadhara
