= Mindrolling Trichen =

Tibetan Buddhist lama

Trichen Jurme Kunzang Wangyal
- Title: 11th Mindrolling Trichen

Personal life
- Born: 1 January 1930 Lumo-ra, Kham, Tibet
- Died: 9 February 2008 (aged 78) Dehra Dun, India

Religious life
- Religion: Tibetan Buddhism
- School: Nyingma

In Tibetan Buddhism, Trichen Jurme Kunzang Wangyal Standard Tibetan: འགྱུར་མེད་ཀུན་བཟང་དབང་རྒྱལ་ (January 1, 1930 – February 9, 2008) was the eleventh Mindrolling Trichen (pronunciation: Mìn-drolling). A lama of the Nyingma school, he served as the ceremonial head of the lineage and oversaw its administrative affairs in exile in India.

== Biography ==
Born in Lumo-ra in Kham (East-Tibet), Trichen Jurme Kunzang Wangyal was the son of the tenth Mindrolling Trichen. After his father's death, the family relocated to Central Tibet where he began his monastic education. At the age of 18, he entered retreat, spending a total of fourteen years in solitary meditation during his studies. He continued his education with Dzongsar Khyentse Chökyi Lodrö. During this period, he married; within Buddhism, celibacy is a requirement only for ordained monks and nuns, and some lamas of the Nyingma lineage are married. He excelled in his studies and discovered the terma (hidden treasure) of the Compassionate One, "Jigten Wangchuk Pema Garwang." As a Tertön, he was instructed to transmit these teachings eleven times to qualified students.

In 1959, he left Tibet for India, where he was formally installed as the Eleventh Mindrolling Trichen in 1962. He collaborated with other lamas, including Dudjom Rinpoche, Dilgo Khyentse Rinpoche, and the 16th Karmapa, who had previously studied with his father. In 1976, he and his family moved to Dehra Dun to oversee the construction of the Mindrolling Monastery.

Mindrolling Trichen was the father of Khandro Rinpoche, a female lama with a following in the West. Some consider him to be an emanation of Padmasambhava.

On February 9, 2008 (the 3rd day of Chotrul Duchen), Mindrolling Trichen Jurme Kunzang Wangyal died at his home in India at the age of 78. The Mindrolling Monastery reported that he passed "without the slightest discomfort."

== Head of the Nyingma school ==
In 2003, the government of Tibet-in-exile requested that he assume responsibility for the administrative affairs of the Nyingma school as one of the main throne holders, succeeding the retiring Penor Rinpoche. The Nyingma school has historically been decentralized, and the position of "head of the school" was established after the Tibetan diaspora. The lamas chosen for this role are highly regarded within the lineage.

== See also ==
- Mindrolling Monastery
