= Dzogchen Monastery =

Tibetan Buddhist monastery in Dêgê County, Sichuan, China

Coordinates: 32.0941°N 98.8629°E

- Tibetan transcription(s); Tibetan: རྫོགས་ཆེན་དགོན། Wylie transliteration: rdzogs chen dgon
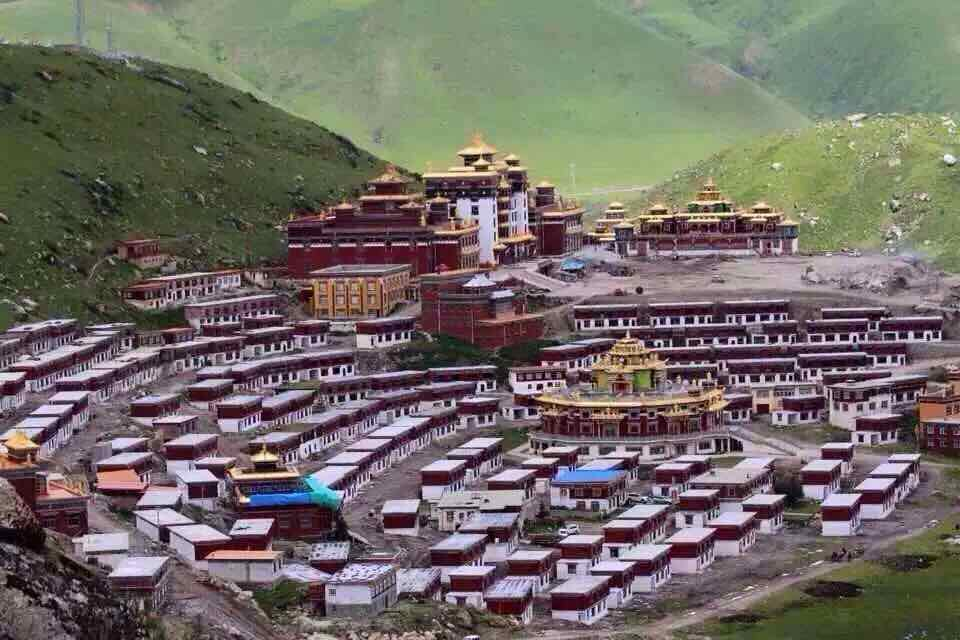
- Dzogchen Monastery in 2015

Religion
- Affiliation: Tibetan Buddhism
- Sect: Nyingma

Location
- Location: Dêgê County, Garzê Tibetan Autonomous Prefecture, Sichuan, known as Kham
- Country: China
- Interactive map of Dzogchen Monastery

Architecture
- Founder: Dzogchen Pema Rigdzin
- Established: 1684; 342 years ago

Dzogchen Monastery (Tibetan: རྫོགས་ཆེན་དགོན།, Wylie: rdzogs chen dgon) is one of the "Six Mother Monasteries" of the Nyingma tradition of Tibetan Buddhism. It is located in Kham within modern day Dêgê County, Garzê Tibetan Autonomous Prefecture, Sichuan, China.

== History ==
Dzogchen Monastery was founded by Pema Rigdzin, 1st Dzogchen Rinpoche (1625–1697) in 1684. It became especially renowned for its Sri Singha Shedra, which was established by Gyelsé Zhenpen Tayé (Wylie: rgyal sras gzhan phan mtha' yas) during the time of Mingyur Namkhé Dorje, 4th Dzogchen Rinpoche shortly after the monastery was almost totally destroyed by an earthquake in 1842.

Among the great masters to have lived and taught at Dzogchen are Khenpo Pema Vajra (Wylie: mkhan po pad ma badz ra), Patrul Rinpoche, Jamgon Ju Mipham Gyatso and Khenpo Shenga. It eventually grew into the largest Nyingma monastery of all time.

During the time of Thubten Chökyi Dorje, 5th Dzogchen Rinpoche (1872–1935), Dzogchen Monastery was at the peak of its activity, with up to five hundred monks residing, 13 retreat centres, and an estimated two hundred and eighty branches - a gathering of which would have seen tens of thousands of lamas, tulkus, khenpos, monks and nuns. Throughout the year, an extensive array of complex ritual ceremonies were accomplished. Dzogchen was also one of the most famous centres of sacred ritual dance, now commonly known as lama dancing.

Dzogchen Monastery is also known as the principal repository of the Konchok Chidu cycle of the Jangter or "Northern Treasure" (Wylie: byang gter), a prominent terma cycle revealed by tertön Jatson Nyingpo.

The monastery's main temple was destroyed by fire in the second month of the Fire Mouse year (1936). It was rebuilt and then the whole monastery was destroyed by the Chinese in 1959.

== Dzogchen Monastery in India ==
Following the destruction of the monastery in the late 1950s, during which the complex was burnt to the ground for a second time in its history, it was re-established in South India according to the directions of the 14th Dalai Lama. The site was chosen personally by the Dalai Lama on land close to his own Dhondenling residence. Work began in 1985, three hundred years after the completion of the original Dzogchen Monastery in Kham.

In January 1992, the Dalai Lama formally inaugurated the new Dzogchen Monastery and gave teachings and empowerments over 11 days. Several thousand attended from the local community and from other monasteries and settlements in South India. He gave advice for the monastery and the community, and pointed out that the work of the outer monastery was complete - meaning the buildings and a gathering of monks - and that now the work of the inner monastery could begin.

Now firmly reestablished at the Dhondenling Tibetan settlement in Kollegal, South India, Dzogchen Monastery is the official seat of the seventh tulku (Sanskrit: nirmanakaya) of the Dzogchen Rinpoche.

In December 2000, the Dzogchen Rinpoche visited the monastery and settlement bestowing teachings and blessings for the lamas, monks, nuns, people of Dhondenling and others who had travelled from throughout all parts of India, Nepal, Australia, Europe, Singapore, the US and Canada. At the busiest times during the visit up to 10,000 people gathered.

== Dzogchen Monastery in Tibet ==
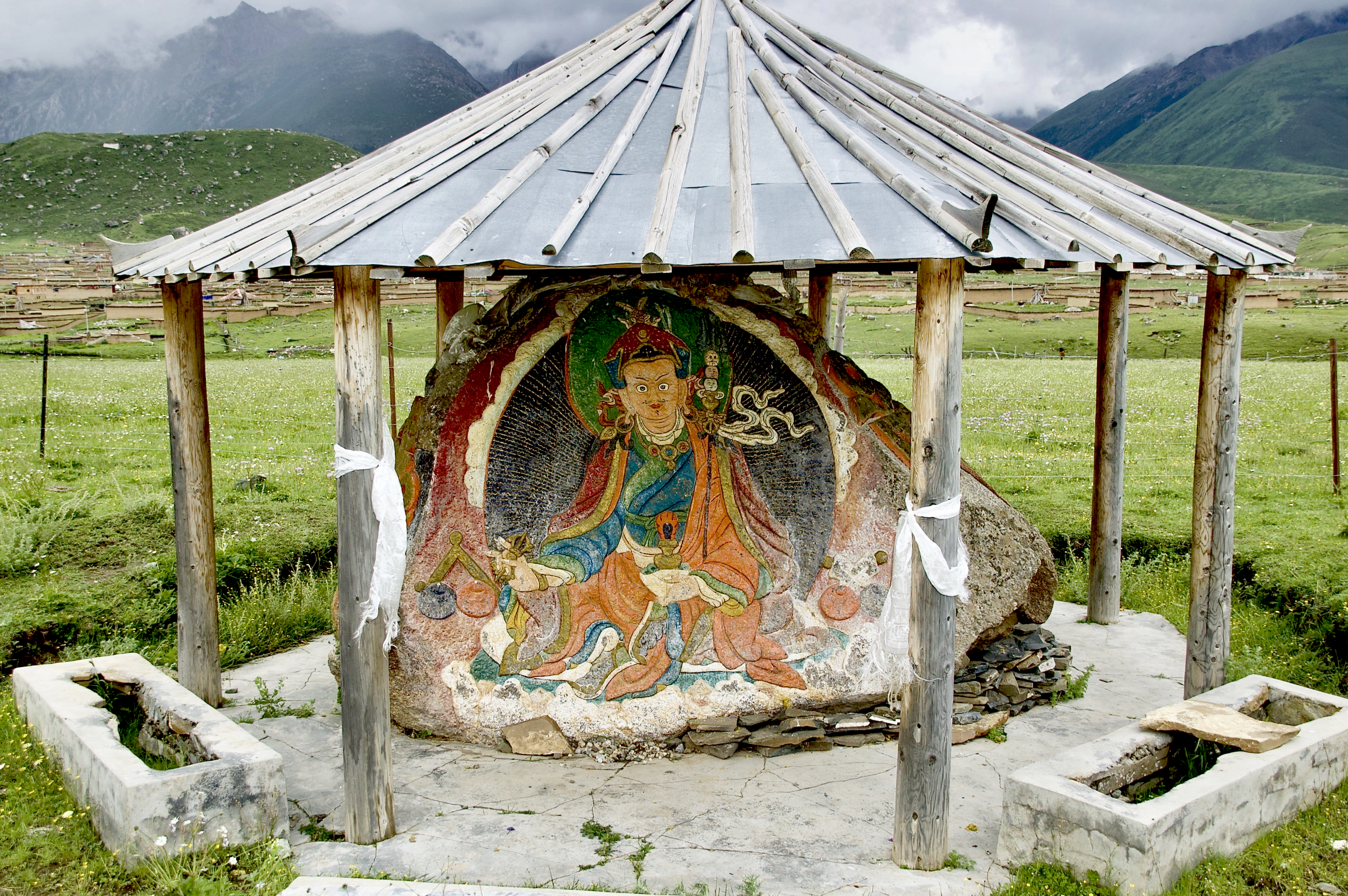
Guru Rinpoche on the road to Dzogchen Monastery, Sichuan

Since the early 1980s the monastery has been undergoing reconstruction. It has 300 legally registered monks in residence, a nunnery, and about 750 others staying there temporarily for varying periods. Besides the monastery itself, the complex includes a shedra and school that teaches traditional Tibetan medicine.

At Pema Tang there is a newly built retreat centre and temple complex situated deep in the Dzogchen valley. The centre is dedicated to the teaching and practice of the Dzogchen tradition.
