= Tsalung =

Tibetan yogic exercises

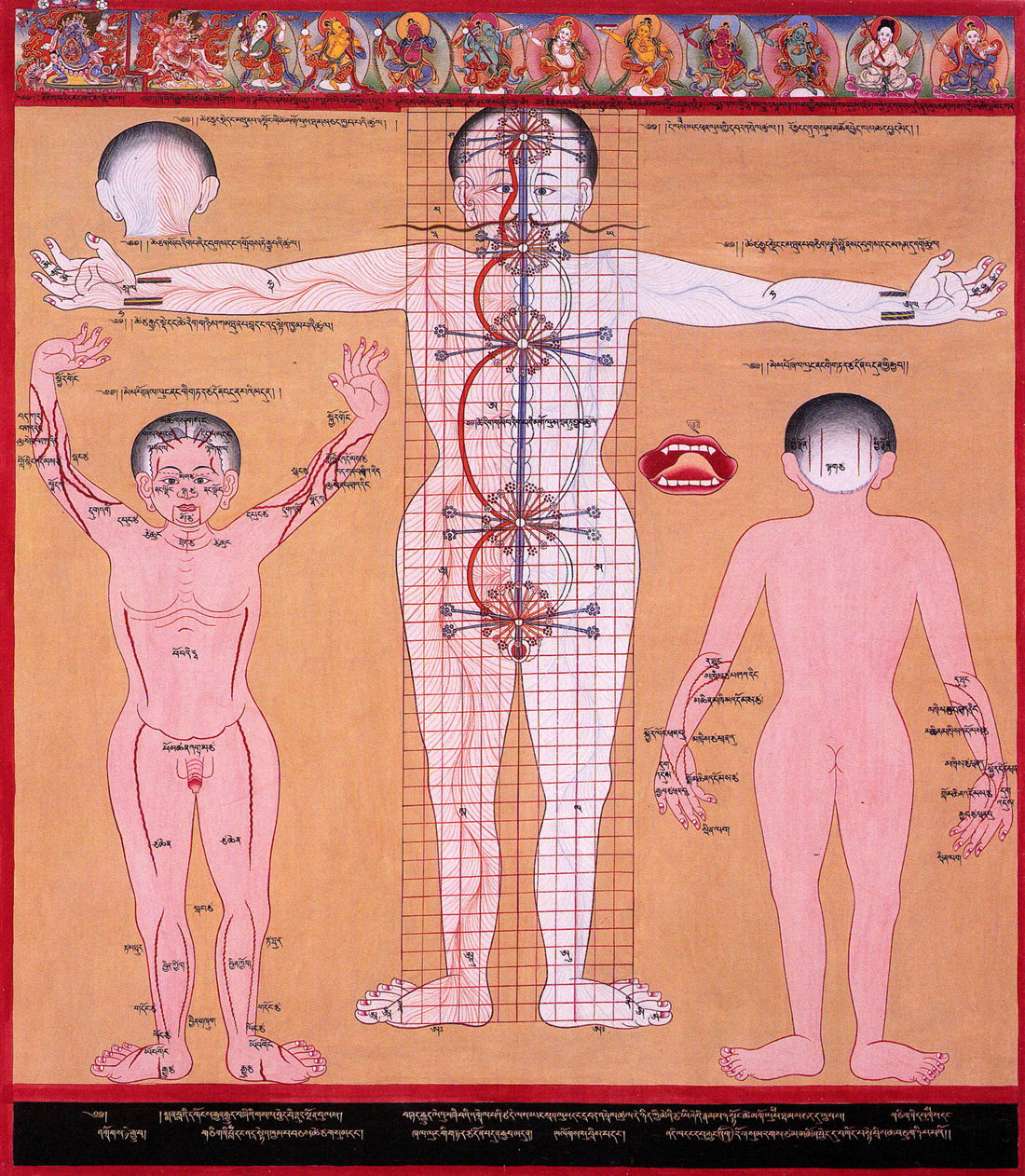
A Tibetan illustration of the subtle body showing the central channel and two side channels as well as five chakras.

Tsalung (Skt: nadi-vayu; Tib. rtsa rlung; where "rtsa" denotes an energetic channel) are special yogic exercises. The exercises are used in the Bon tradition and the four main schools of Tibetan Buddhism. Trul khor employs the tsa lung and they constitute the internal yantra or sacred architecture of this yoga's Sanskrit name, yantra yoga. Tsa lung are also employed in completion stage practices.

The exercises are used:

- to bring the lung from the side channels into the central channel
- to open major chakras

That coincides with mind releasing dualistic misperceptions and abiding in non-dual awareness of rigpa (Tib. rig pa). Detailed instructions on the exercises describe 3 levels of rtsa rlung: external, internal and secret.

Each level contains 5 exercises corresponding to five elements.

== Background ==
The subtle body yogas systems like the Six Dharmas of Naropa and the Six Yogas of Kalachakra make use of energetic schemas of human psycho-physiology composed of "energy channels" (Skt. nadi, Tib. rtsa), "winds" or currents (Skt. vayu, Tib. rlung), "drops" or charged particles (Skt. bindu, Tib. thig le) and chakras ("wheels"). These subtle energies are seen as "mounts" for consciousness, the physical component of awareness. They are engaged by various means such as pranayama (breath control) to produce blissful experiences that are then applied to the realization of ultimate reality.

== Applications in completion stage ==
The embodied energetic practices associated with the completion stage of deity yoga make use of a tantric schema of human psycho-physiology composed of "energy channels" (Skt. nadi, Tib. rtsa), "winds" or vital currents (vāyu, rlung), and "energetic drops" or charged particles (bindu, thig le) which are said to converge at certain places along the central channel called chakras (lit. "wheels"). The subtle body energies are seen as "mounts" for consciousness, the physical component of awareness and are engaged in order to generate the 'great bliss' (bde-mchog; maha-sukha) which is used to attain enlightenment.

One of the most widespread methods for causing the winds to enter the central channel is tummo (caṇḍālī, inner heat, literally "fierce woman"). This practice is done in many different ways and applied to numerous other practices. The basic method involves somekind of visualization that symbolizes heat or fire (the red vital essence, i.e. bindu) at the chakra below the navel as well as breathing techniques such as vase-shaped holding of the breath (bum pa can, kumbhaka). This ignites the inner heat, which moves up the central channel and melts the white vital essence (bindu, thigle) located in the head. This white vital essence drips down the central channel, filling the body with bliss.

Inner heat practice is the foundation of the other completion yogas, such as yogic sexual union (karmamudrā), luminosity (clear light) yoga, illusory body yoga, dream yoga, bardo yoga, and phowa. The practice of these yogas may also be supplemented with various physical exercises, called trul khor.

Luminosity or 'clear light' (Tibetan od gsal, Sanskrit prabhāsvara) refers to the radiant nature of mind, also described as the primordially pure ground, which may be experienced through meditation, through inner heat yoga, during great bliss, in sleep and during the dying process. To reach this, a yogi trains to access this luminous mind experience through various methods, which then give rise to various signs (such as the visions of a mirage, smoke, flickering lights like fireflies, etc.).

== See also ==
- Buddhist meditation
- Prana
- Qi
- Taoist meditation
