= Bardo yoga =

Tibetan Buddhist tantric practice

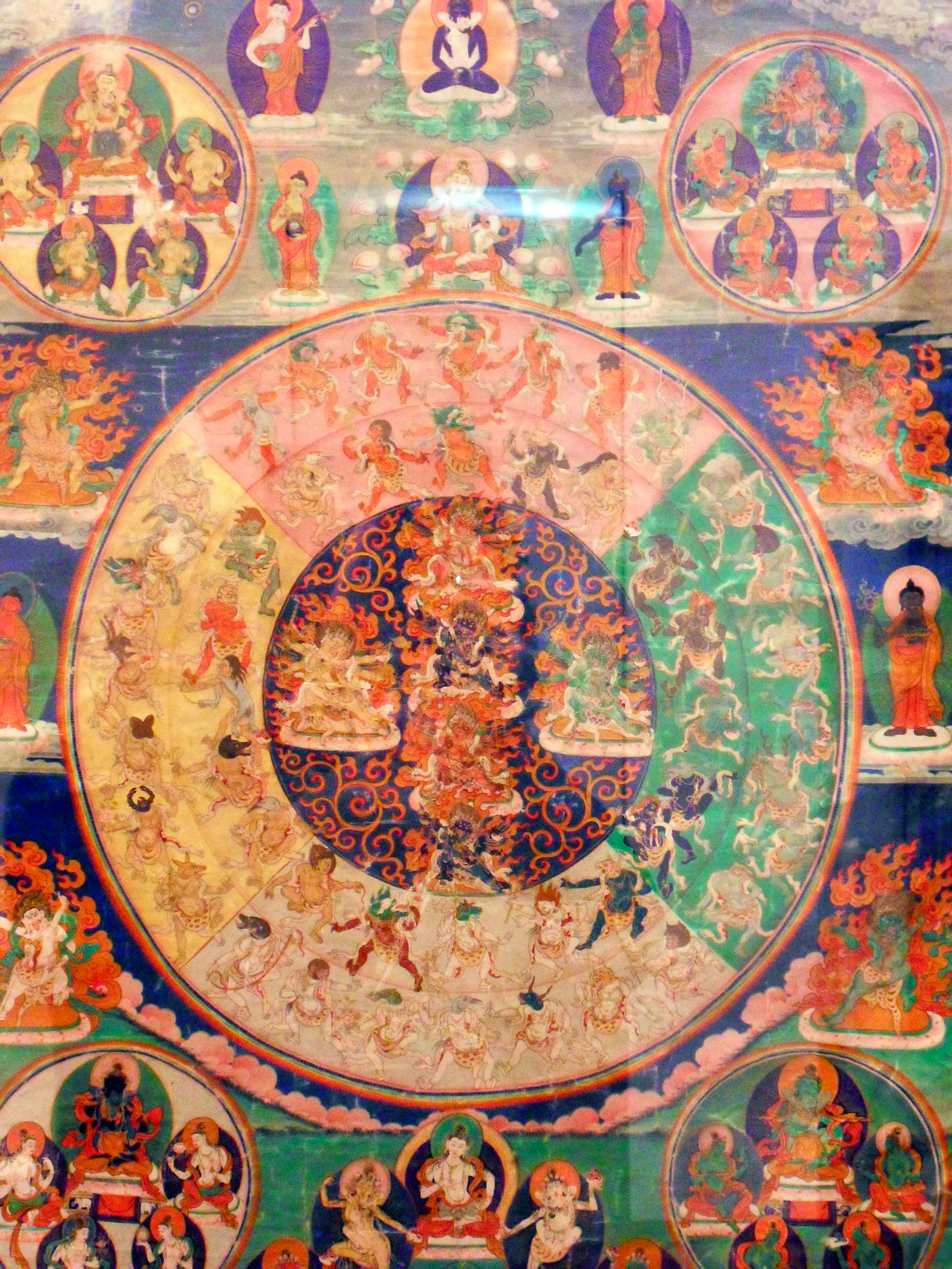
The deities that one may encounter in the post-mortem interim state

Bardo yoga deals with navigating the bardo state in between death and rebirth. It is one of the Six Dharmas of Naropa (Wylie: na ro'i chos drug, Skt. ṣaḍdharma, "Naro's six doctrines" or "six teachings"), a set of advanced Tibetan Buddhist tantric practices compiled by the Indian mahasiddhas Tilopa and Nāropa (1016-1100 CE) and passed on to the Tibetan translator-yogi Marpa Lotsawa (c. 1012).

Tilopa's oral instructions state:

The yogi at the time of death withdraws the energies of the senses and elements, and directs energies of sun and moon to the heart, giving rise to a myriad of yogic samadhis. Consciousness goes to outer objects, but he regards them as objects of a dream. The appearances of death persist for seven days, or perhaps as much as seven times seven, and then one must take rebirth. At that time meditate on deity yoga or simply remain absorbed in emptiness. After that, when the time comes for rebirth, use the deity yoga of a tantric master and meditate on guru yoga with whatever appears. Doing that will arrest the experience of the bardo. This is the instruction of Sukhasiddhi.

According to Gyalwa Wensapa, one should practice tummo before death to experience radiance and then arise as Buddha Vajradhara in one's bardo body.

== Gampopa's presentation ==
Gampopa's Closely Stringed Pearls describe a "practical guidance" (dmar khrid) on the process of the interim state or in between state. It gives a long explanation of the death process and how it is experienced by the dying person. The interim state is said to occur after death for up to seven weeks until the next rebirth.

There are three parts of these instructions:

1. recognizing the radiance in the first interim
2. recognizing the illusory body in the second interim
3. blocking the door to the womb in the third interim

The process of dying is outlined as follows. First the five outer sense perceptions dissolve, one by one. Then the four material elements dissolve. When the earth element dissolves the body feels like sinking, when the water element dissolves spit and snot come out of the mouth and nose, and one's mouth and nose become dry. When the fire element dissolves, body heat disappears and the extremities shake and twitch. When the air element dissolves, breathing becomes irregular and eventually stops. Then the consciousness dissolves into light and the dying person sees a weak light, like the moon rising and their consciousness becomes smoky. Then comes the phase of rising, in which one sees a more intense light, which is like a sunrise, while one's consciousness flickers like fireflies. Then during the phase of arrival, one finds oneself in dense darkness and one's consciousness is weak like the light of a single flame. Then, the phase of arrival dissolves into the radiance (’od gsal) of emptiness, dharmakaya, which is found in all beings. For a yogi who has practiced meditation on radiance before, their radiance meditation merges with the natural radiance easily.

The second instruction on recognizing the illusory body is meant for those yogis who fail to remain in the state of radiance and thus enter the bardo (between half a day and four days after death). It is divided into recognizing the impure illusory body and recognizing the pure illusory body. In the bardo, one appears in a dream-like body which is similar to one's previous living body, this is the impure illusory body. They are able to go anywhere and is unobstructed by physical things, but when they attempt to talk to people, they cannot hear the dead person. The dead person gradually realizes they are dead and after some days, they see that they will soon be reborn. If the dead person is a yogi, they may be able to recognize that this body is illusory and they may instead take up the form of their chosen meditation deity. They then meditate on Mahamudra and purify their habital tendencies. It is said that meditation in the in-between state is more efficient than meditating a hundred years while alive.

The third type of instruction explains how to block rebirth if one fails to become awakened using the second set of instructions. At this stage, the person to be reborn sees their future parents having sex and feel attraction towards the father or the mother (depending on their sex). Then they will enter the womb and into a new rebirth. However, the deceased person can prevent this process by staying calm and entering meditative absorption when they have the vision. They can image their parents as lamas or as deities if this helps avoid feelings of desire for them. They can also contemplate that they are empty, like illusions and meditate on radiance and emptiness.

== Gelug presentation ==
Tsongkhapa's commentary states that bardo yoga relies on the yogi's previous practice of tummo, radiance, illusory body and dream yoga. After all, the experiences of illusory body and clear light in waking and in sleep states is similar to the experiences in the post-mortem bardo. Thus, when death comes, one applies the same principles one used to attain the yoga of radiance/clear light in sleep:

Should death arrive before supreme enlightenment has been attained, and one wishes to apply the yoga for enlightenment at the time of death, then [as the death process sets in] one engages the yogas of controlling the vital energies in order to recognize the clear light of the moment of death, using the same principles that were applied in the yoga of retaining the clear light of sleep. In this way one enters into the bardo experience, applies the techniques learned through the yoga of the illusory body of dreams, and generates the bardo body as the illusory body of the bardo.

Thus, to achieve the clear light of death, one must go through the practice of tummo, the dissolution of the elements process and the visions leading up to clear light and so forth. One must have the ability to stabilize one's mind on an understanding of emptiness and the yogic means for inducing the four blisses to succeed.

Tsongkhapa also states that there are two lesser methods, one is to cultivate the thought, "I am dead. These appearances must be bardo manifestations." This may help one recognize that one is in the bardo. Likewise, one can apply whatever samadhi one has acquired to the process of the dissolution of the elements at death. But these methods are inferior to the tantric practice of clear light yoga and lead to weak realizations. He also mentions "the oath of rebirth" where one "cultivates the aspiration to take rebirth into any of the pure buddha lands."
