= Dzogchen Rinpoche =

Head lama of Dzogchen Monastery

Dzogchen Rinpoche (Tibetan: ཛོགས་ཆེན་རིན་པོ་ཆེ, Wylie: rdzogs chen rin po che) is the head lama of Dzogchen Monastery, one of the largest monasteries in eastern Tibet which was destroyed in 1959 and rebuilt in the 1980s.

The current Dzogchen Rinpoche, who is enumerated as the seventh in the lineage of mindstream 'emanations' (Sanskrit: nirmanakaya), 'Jikme Losal Wangpo' (Tibetan: འཇིགས་མེད་བློ་གསལ་དབང་པོ, Wylie: 'jigs med blo gsal dbang po), was born in Gangtok, Sikkim in 1964, as the younger brother of Sogyal Rinpoche. He was enthroned by Dodrupchen Rinpoche at the Royal Palace in Gangtok 1972. He went on to study at the Institute of Dialectics in Dharamsala, where his education was closely supervised by the 14th Dalai Lama. His main teachers include Dodrupchen Rinpoche, Dudjom Rinpoche and Dilgo Khyentse Rinpoche. He established a Dzogchen Monastery in exile, in Kollegal, South India, which was inaugurated by the Dalai Lama in 1992.
