= Sherab Palden Beru =

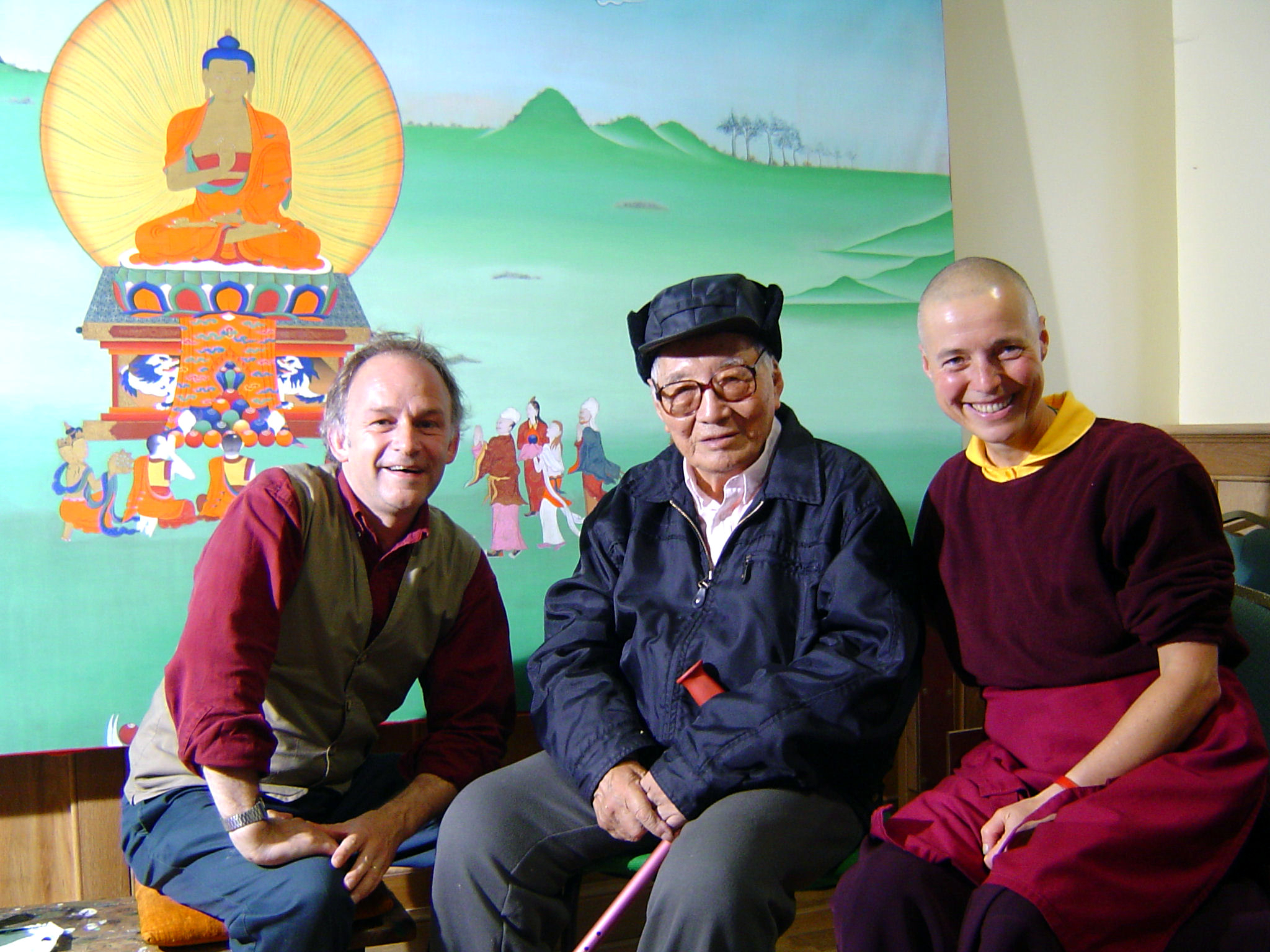
- Sherab Palden Beru with his German-born protégé Ani Semchi (right) and another student, during thangka restoration work at Samye Ling monastery, Scotland, in 2005
- Born: Tsewang Palden; 1911; Kham, Tibet
- Died: November 29, 2012

Sherab Palden Beru (1911 – 29 November 2012) was an exiled Tibetan thangka artist who played a key role in preserving the art-form through the training of western students over a period of more than four decades.

== Life and work ==
=== Early life and training ===
Sherab Palden Beru was born Tsewang Palden into a nomadic family that had lived in the eastern province of Kham, Tibet, since the mid-15th century. Beru entered the Namgyal Ling monastery at the age of nine. His aptitude for drawing was quickly recognised, and his formal artistic training began from the age of 13, under the guidance of the monastery's artist-lama. At age 22, he completed his first thangka.

While studying at Namgyal Ling, Beru attained high levels of skill both in Thangka painting and in associated monastic disciplines such as ritual music, and Lama dancing in particular. This included learning how to create masks and costumes for ceremonial dances, and the tents such dances were sometimes performed in. He also acted as a chant leader and as a bursar.

=== Move to Lhasa and to India ===
In 1956, after over 30 years of living at the monastery, Beru left for Lhasa. In 1959, he was forced to escape to India following the invasion of Tibet by Chinese forces. He arrived in Sikkim by horse and then traveled on by car to Kalimpong, where he resumed painting thangkas. He taught at the Young Lamas Home School in Dalhousie where, amongst other works, he was commissioned by Lokesh Chandra to produce a series of drawings of mandalas for publication. He later relocated to Delhi, where he lived "at a house of writers and artists run by Dr Lokesh Chandra, a scholar of Buddhism".

=== Move to Scotland ===
In 1967, he was asked by the 16th Karmapa, Rangjung Rigpe Dorje, to make his way to Scotland where Chogyam Trungpa and Akong Tulku Rinpoche had established the first Tibetan Buddhist centre in the west, Kagyu Samye Ling, in Eskdalemuir, Dumfriesshire. Despite having some initial misgivings about leaving the Tibetan community in exile in Northern India so soon after having arrived as a refugee, Beru acceded to the wishes of his Guru.

In Scotland, Beru established a thangka-painting workshop. He adapted his painting style to accommodate for the materials available in Scotland. As plans for the construction of a temple emerged, Beru and his students worked on "silk screens, carvings, and decorations" for its interior.

=== Art ===
For the next 35 years, Beru devoted himself to creating thangkas of outstanding quality in the Karma Gadri style, and to training western students in the techniques of thangka painting. His work can be seen in centres through Europe, Asia and North America. His principal achievements are to be seen at Samye Ling itself, where he designed not only the temple interior but several cycles of exquisite thangkas, depicting variously the Kagyu Lineage holders, Sakyamuni Buddha, Indian mahasiddhas and the Four Directional Guardians. Most notable are the much-copied painting of the Kagyu Lineage Refuge Tree and the painting of the Guru Yoga of the 8th Karmapa, Mikyo Dorje. He painted the thangka of Vajradhara in the Dorje Dzong shrine room in Boulder, Colorado.

The paintings in the temple at Samye Ling are known for their combination of large size and exquisite detail. As in Tibet, many of these paintings took between one and three years to complete. Along with Akong Rinpoche and his students, Beru also helped retrieve, restore and preserve thangkas from Tibet, many of which were destroyed in the early days of the Chinese occupation. Later Beru was joined at Samye Ling by his nephew, Gyamtso Tashi, an ordained monk and sculptor, who reached India after making a three-year pilgrimage on foot across Tibet.

=== Later years and death ===
Well into his 90s, Beru no longer contributed directly to the art-work, but remained a leading authority on matters of Tibetan art, and was regularly consulted by practicing thangka artists. He died on 29 November at Samye Ling at an age of about 100. His body was left completely undisturbed in 'Tukdam' meditation for the traditional three-day period after his death.
