= Pema Rigdzin, 1st Dzogchen Rinpoche =

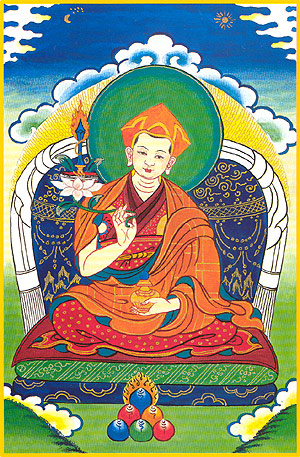

Dzogchen Pema Rigdzin (Tibetan: རྫོགས་ཆེན་པདྨ་རིག་འཛིན་, Wylie: rdzogs chen padma rig 'dzin) (1625–1697) was the 1st Dzogchen Rinpoche of Tibet and a disciple of the Fifth Dalai Lama. Pema Rigdzin was a mindstream 'emanation (Sanskrit: nirmanakaya) of Vimalamitra, Padmasambhava and Saraha.

== Nomenclature and etymology ==
'Pema' is a Tibetan contraction or dialectic variant of 'lotus' (Sanskrit: padma) and Rigdzin (Tibetan; Sanskrit: vidya-dhara) may be rendered into English as "awareness holder" or "container of rigpa".

== Iconography ==
In the iconographic representation of Pema Rigdzin herewith, within his right or upaya-hand he holds the stem of a lotus (Sanskrit: padma (attribute) sprouting from his heartmind chakra (Tibetan: འཁོར་ལོ་, Wylie: 'khor lo) that functions as a dais for the Dharma, represented by a book or tomb, which in turn supports the flaming sword of prajna (Sanskrit) often seen as an attribute of Manjushri. Iconographically, flames denote 'spiritual power' in the Himalayan thangka twilight language tradition. In the sky above his head reside the Sun and Moon in balance, metonymic of the solar and lunar subtle channels of the subtle body. The Sun and Moon and clouds also form a simulacrum of the 'Face of Glory' (Sanskrit: kirtimukha). The triratna is represented by the stylized trefoil pattern upon the foundation of the throne that supports him. The colored objects in the foreground are 'wish-fulfilling jewels' (Sanskrit: cintamani). In his left or prajna-hand at the level of the Muladhara (or one of the other three foundation ′khor lo) is the 'Urn of Wisdom' (Sanskrit: bumpa) which is one of the Ashtamangala. The foundation of wisdom is an awareness of the 'base' (Tibetan: གཞི་, Wylie: gzhi), a very important theological concept and locus of practice in traditions of Dzogchen. The Bumpa is also evident as his aureole. The clouds are represent of the sky or aether.
