= Chatral Sangye Dorje =

Buddhist philosopher

- Title: Rinpoche

Personal life
- Born: Throgyal Dorje; 18 June 1913 Kham, Tibet
- Died: 30 December 2015 (aged 102) Pharping, Nepal
- Spouse: Kamala
- Children: Tara Devi and Saraswati
- Other name: Chatral Rinpoche

Religious life
- Religion: Tibetan Buddhism
- School: Nyingma
- Lineage: Dzogchen

Senior posting
- Teacher: Dudjom Jigdral Yeshe Dorje, Dzongsar Khyentse Chökyi Lodrö, Khenpo Ngawang Palzang, Kunzang Dekyong Wangmo
- Students: Tharchin Rinpoche, Jampal Yeshe Gyaltsen, Dudjom Yangsi Rinpoche, Kathog Situ Rinpoche, Wangchug Namgyal, Serling Tulku Yongdzin Rinpoche

Chatral Sangye Dorje Rinpoche (Tibetan: བྱ་བྲལ་སངས་རྒྱས་རྡོ་རྗེ་, Wylie: bya-bral sangs-rgyas rdo-rje, "Enlightened Indestructible Freedom From Activity"; June 18, 1913 – December 30, 2015) was a Tibetan Dzogchen master and a reclusive ngagpa yogi, known for his great realization and strict discipline. Chatral Sangye Dorje was a disciple of Khenpo Ngawang Pelzang and was widely regarded as one of the most highly realized Dzogchen yogis. In addition to his relationship with Khenpo Ngagchung, Chatral Sangye Dorje also studied with some of the last century's most renowned masters, including Dudjom Jigdral Yeshe Dorje, Dzongsar Khyentse Chökyi Lodrö, and the famed Kunzang Dekyong Wangmo. Chatral Sangye Dorje was one of the primary lineage holders of the Longchen Nyingthig, and in particular the lineage that descends through Jigme Lingpa's heart son Jigme Gyalwe Nyugu and then on to Patrul Rinpoche.

Prior to his death in 2015, Chatral Sangye Dorje divided his time between Salbari, India, and Kathmandu, Nepal.

== Early life ==
Throgyal Dorje was born in the Nyarong Valley of Eastern Kham in 1913, in the year of the Female Water Ox, on the morning of 10th day of the lunar Tibetan calendar, which coincides with June 18 of the solar Gregorian calendar. The day is celebrated each year as the day Guru Padmasambhava manifested as Dorje Drollo. His father was Pema Dondrub whose family line was Mukpo Dong and his mother, Sonam Tso, was a member of the Wakyung family.

Several predictions are said to have foretold the birth of Chatral Rinpoche. Among the future predictions of Yonru Chimey Dorje, a disciple of Chagdud Pema Dudul, the following text is found:

A supreme mind-emanation of Padma,
A boy who is blessed by Vimalamitra, With the name Vajra, from the year the Ox,
Will promote the teachings of the practice lineage.

— Yonru Chimey Dorje

The day after Chatral Sangye Dorje was born, Asay Bigo Trulku Nyima Gyelthsen, who was an incarnation of Lopen Chandra Gomi, visited Pema and Sonam to tell them about the vision he had about his emergence. In accordance to his vision, he bestowed the name Throgyal Dorjee to Chatral Sangye Dorje. According to some sources, when he was still an infant, people observed that he had a profound connection with sacred objects and could recognize them instinctively, even though he was too young to understand their significance. These early signs were recognized by local spiritual leaders, and Throgyal Dorje was identified as a reincarnation of a respected Lama, marking the beginning of his significant spiritual journey.

== Life as a hermit ==
=== Education in Dharma ===
At age 15, Chatral Sangye Dorje left his home to study and practice Buddhism with Buddhist masters. This act of renunciation began his life-long journey as a carefree yogi seeking enlightenment at any cost in order to effectively help other beings with compassion. During this time, he received transmissions of the Dudjom Tersar cycle of terton Dudjom Lingpa from the terton's son Dorje Dradül. He further received teachings from Sera Khandro Kunzang Dekyong Wangmo, who was a daughter-in-law of Terton Dudjom Lingpa. She passed on to Chatral Sangye Dorje the terma cycle teachings of Sera Khandro and he became the principal lineage holder of this tradition as well.

Following the instructions of Sera Khandro, Chatral Sangye Dorje visited Kathok Monastery where he met his root guru Khenpo Ngawang Pelzang. Khenpo Ngawang gave Chatral Rinpoche many teachings and transmissions—particularly of the Longchen Nyinthig tradition. Chatral Sangye Dorje studied with other masters at Kathok Monastery as well, in addition to the great Khyentse Chökyi Lodrö from Dzongsar Monastery, which like Kathok lies in the Derge region of Kham. Realizing his greatness, Khenpo Ngawang crowned the then Throgyal Dorjee as Chatral Sangye Dorje.

Chatral Rinpoche studied under 40 of the most accomplished and highly renowned teachers of Buddhism. Other teachers under whom Chatral Sangye Dorje studied were Shechen Kongtrul Pema Drimé Lekpé Lodrö, Gyurme Tenpa Namgyal, Jigdral Chogkyi Langpo, Jigmey Dechen Dorje, Pema Trinley Gyatso, Katok Situ Chökyi Gyatso, Thupten Chökyi Dorje, Adzom Gyalse Gyurme Dorje and Apang Tertön.

Chatral Rinpoche met Dudjom Jigdral Yeshe Dorje while in Central Tibet. Dudjom Rinpoche had a great influence in Chatral Rinpoche's life. Dudjom Rinpoche transmitted to Chatral Rinpoche the complete cycle of the Dudjom Tersar teachings, naming him the Vajra Regent of the tradition.

=== Dharma activities in Tibet ===
As a ngagpa, Chatral Rinpoche spent most of his time wandering ceaselessly and meditating in deep mountain caves. In 1937, the fifth Reting Rinpoche and the regent of 14th Dalai Lama, Jamphel Yeshe Gyaltsen requested Khenpo Ngawang Pelzang to come to Lhasa to give Dzogchen transmissions. Owing to his old age, Khenpo Ngawang instead recommended Reting Rinpoche to look for Chatral Rinpoche.

Reting Rinpoche sent messengers with a letter from Khenpo Ngawang to find Chatral Rinpoche. They found him meditating in a dense forest of Southern Tibet. Though reluctant at first, Chatral Sangye Dorje agreed to go to Lhasa on seeing a letter from his root guru. Chatral Sangye Dorje stayed with Reting Rinpoche for two years, giving him many transmissions and instructions - the ear-whispered and profound heart essence of the Dzogchen teachings.

=== Dharma activities outside Tibet ===
In 1958, Chatral Rinpoche left Tibet for Bhutan where he travelled to Paro Taktsang and other places associated with Guru Rinpoche. He then moved to India, where he restored a small temple in Jorebungalow near Darjeeling. He turned the temple into a three-year meditation retreat center for Longchen Nyinthig practice. This was the first such center built by a Tibetan outside of Tibet. Chatral Sangye Dorje further established retreat centers in Sikkim, Godawari, Yolmo and Pharping.

In 1960, Chatral Sangye Dorje visited some of the Buddhist pilgrimage sites in India. In 1968, Chatral Sangye Dorje met American Trappist monk Father Thomas Merton. Chatral Sangye Dorje and Merton exchanged conversations on philosophical and spiritual aspects of Christianity and Buddhism. As they split, Merton remarked, "That’s the greatest man I ever met. That’s my teacher."

On request of Lungten Tulku, Chatral Sangye Dorje visited Bhutan in 1988. He petitioned His Majesty King Jigme Singye Wangchuk for construction of retreat center in Beyul Langdra. The retreat center is now headed by Lungten Tulku. In 1992, he meet Paramhamsa Yogiraj Balkrishnananda, a nepalese hindu saint. During their conversation, they engaged in a profound discussion about the experience of Transcendental Atiyoga. Following this enlightening dialogue, he conferred upon Balkrishnananda the esteemed title of "Sangay Rangdrol”(སངས་རྒྱསརང་གྲོལ). A close disciple of Dudjom Rinpoche, Chatral Sangye Dorje was empowered as the Vajra Regent of Dudjom Rinpoche. He recognized Sangye Pema Zhepa, the grandson of Dudjom Rinpoche, as the reincarnation or yangsi of Dudjom Rinpoche in 1990. He presided over the enthronement of Dudjom Yangsi in 1994, and passed on the teachings of the Dudjom Tersar cycle to his master's reincarnation. Chatral Sangye Dorje himself looked over the education of Dudjom Yangsi. Dudjom Rinpoche considers Chatral Rinpoche to be his root guru.

Chatral Sangye Dorje was very selective when it came to his students, and as such had only a handful of students, despite being famed for his Dharma activities all around the world. This allowed Chatral Sangye Dorje to spend more time in retreats. Every 15th and 30th day of the lunar month, Chatral Sangye Dorje would release thousands of fishes rescued from fisheries into Trishuli River near Pharphing or into Teesta River near Siliguri. He also rescued animals from slaughterhouses, paying money to the owners for the rescued animals.

== Family ==
In 1962, Chatral Sangye Dorje married Sangyum Kamala. Sangyum was only 20, while Chatral Sangye Dorje was already 49. They were married for 53 years at the time of Chatral Sangye Dorje's death in 2015. Chatral Sangye Dorje and Kamala have two daughters, Semo Tara Devi and Semo Saraswati. Semo Saraswati is unmarried and has been recognized as the reincarnation of Sera Khandro.

== Death ==
Chatral Rinpoche died of natural causes on 30 December 2015, coinciding with the 20th day of the female wood sheep year lunar Tibetan calendar at around 5 pm (NPT) in Pharping, Nepal. His body remained in tukdam for three days after his death. His mahaparinirvana ceremony was led by his two heart sons Katok Situ Rinpoche and Dudjom Yangsi Rinpoche. His kudung was visited by several important lineage masters, including Chökyi Nyima Rinpoche, Tsikey Chokling Rinpoche and Tsoknyi Rinpoche.

== Teachings ==
Chatral Sangye Dorje has shunned institutional and political involvement his whole life, choosing instead to live the life of a wandering yogi. Even in old age he continued to move about, rarely remaining in one place for more than a few months. A lay yogi, he was also greatly concerned with maintaining strict discipline in the context of the Dzogchen view. In addition to his emphasis on the union of view and conduct, Chatral Sangye Dorje also stressed the practice of retreat. He has established numerous retreat centers throughout the Himalayas, including in Pharping, Yolmo, and Darjeeling.

=== Vegetarianism ===
While visiting the Bodh Gaya in 1960 at age 47, Chatral Sangye Dorje became a vegetarian and made a firm commitment to give up meat and alcohol. He stated:

If you take meat, it goes against the vows one takes in seeking refuge in the Buddha, Dharma and Sangha. Because when you take meat you have to take a being’s life. So I gave it up.

— Chatral Sangye Dorje

He advocated compassion and vegetarianism in his teachings and had a yearly practice of spending his money releasing fish from the Calcutta fish markets. Meat was not allowed in his monasteries.

== Primary teachers ==
- Khenpo Ngawang Pelzang (also known as Khenpo Ngaga, Ngawang Palzang)
- Dudjom Jigdral Yeshe Dorje
- Dzongsar Khyentse Chökyi Lodrö (previous incarnation of Dzongsar Jamyang Khyentse Rinpoche)
- Kunzang Dekyong Wangmo

== Primary lineages ==
Though his main lineage was the Longchen Nyingthig, Chatral Sangye Dorje was also closely associated with the Dudjom Tersar lineage. He was empowered as the regent of Dudjom Jigdral Yeshe Dorje and was passing on this lineage to this master's reincarnation, who lives primarily in Central Tibet.

- Longchen Nyingthig
- Kunzang Dekyong Wangmo
- Dudjom Tersar
- Sera Khandro Dewai Dorje

== Notable students ==
Chatral Sangye Dorje was the root guru of Dudjom Yangsi Rinpoche. Other notable students of Chatral Rinpoche include Tharchin Rinpoche, Serling Tulku Yongdzin Rinpoche, and Chogyal Wangchuk Namgyal.

== Bibliography ==
- Chatral Rinpoche (2007). Zach Larson (ed.). Compassionate Action. Snow Lion Publications. ISBN 978-1559392716.

=== Online texts ===
- Chatral Rinpoche Series by Lotsawa House
