= Khenchen Palden Sherab Rinpoche =

Tibetan Buddhist monk and scholar (1938–2010)

Khenchen Palden Sherab Rinpoche

Khenchen Palden Sherab Rinpoche (Tibetan: དཔལ་ལྡན་ཤེས་རབ་, Wylie: dpal ldan shes rab) (10 May 1938 – 19 June 2010), also known as "Khen Rinpoche," was a teacher, a Nyingma scholar, a guru, and a Dzogchen master in the Nyingma school of Tibetan Buddhism. He was considered by Penor Rinpoche to be one of the most learned living Nyingma scholars. Palden Sherab founded the Orgyen Samye Chokhor Ling Nunnery, the first nunnery in Deer Park (Sarnath)

Born in Kham, Tibet, Palden Sherab escaped invading Chinese forces in 1960 to arrive in India and join other monastic leaders to collect and salvage Tibetan Buddhist teachings carried by the exile community. He was appointed the Nyingma professor at the Central University of Tibetan Studies in 1967. Palden Sherab's root lamas are Dudjom Rinpoche, Penor Rinpoche, Dilgo Khyentse; his main lineages are Mipham Rinpoche's textual teachings and Terton Tsasum Lingpa's revealed Tersar. He considered Khenpo Ashe, his shedra teacher, very kind.

A student of Dudjom Rinpoche, Palden Sherab taught in France and the United States. He founded the Padmasambava Buddhist Center and Palden Padma Samye Ling retreat center in upstate New York, which grew to include monasteries and centers in Mexico, Canada, Puerto Rico, India and Russia. Palden Sherab designed and managed the construction of the retreat centers, monasteries and a nunnery, and the Miracle Stupa in India. His seat is at the Orgyen Samye Chokhor Ling Nunnery in Sarnath.

== Life ==
=== Tibet ===
Palden Sherab was born in the village of Joephu (Tibetan: རྒྱུས་ཕུ་, Wylie: rgyus phu) on 10 May 1938, in the year of the Earth Tiger. Joephu is in the Dhoshul (Tibetan: རྡོ་ཤུལ་, Wylie: rdo shul) region of Kham, Tibet, near the sacred mountain of Jowo Zegyal (Tibetan: ཇོ་བོ་གཟེ་རྒྱལ་, Wylie: jo bo gze rgyal). His father was Lama Chimed Namgyal Rinpoche; his siblings included two sisters and a brother, and his grandparents were respected scholars and practitioners. In accordance with local tradition, his family were seasonal nomads. His mother Pema Lhadze introduced him to the monk Lama Ahtsok, who was on a solitary retreat in a nearby cave.

Palden Sherab began monastic studies at age six at the Nyingma Gochen Monastery (Tibetan: སྒོ་ཆེན་སྒོམ་, Wylie: sgo chen sgom), which was founded in the late 17th century by the treasure revealer and crazy wisdom terton Tsasum Lingpa. Tsasum Lingpa was a recognized reincarnation of Nubchen Sangye Yeshe, one of Padmasambhava's twenty-five students. Palden Sherab is a recognized emanation of Nubchen Sangye Yeshe. He was known for reading very fast at Gochen Monastery, and was considered eccentric. Palden Sherab's nickname was "the cyclone", due to his constant activity.

The monastery had been administered for generations by Palden Sherab's family. At the age of 12, he was invited to attend the Taklung Kagyu school's Riwoche Monastery's Shedra, where he could be trained to take over as Khenpo (abbot) of Gochen Monastery. Palden Sherab then entered the Riwoche Monastery, in the Riwoche (Tibetan: རི་བོ་ཆེ་, Wylie: ri bo che) region of Kham. He received the teachings of Mipham Rinpoche and of the Katok Monastery through Khenpo Ashe, his Shedra teacher, in addition to Longchenpa's Seven Treasuries, three volumes of Rongzompa and the teachings of Katokpa Dampa Deshek, Katok Khempo Nyakchung, and Getse Mahapandita. During China's invasion of eastern Tibet, Palden Sherab graduated from the Shedra's monastic education at Riwoche Monastery that traditionally includes grammar and poetry, astrology, astronomy, medicine, the arts, Sanskrit, Buddhist philosophy, and the major Buddhist texts.

During the winter of 1960 and ongoing Chinese invasion, he left the monastery to join his family as they escaped into the Himalayas. With India as their destination, they escaped capture three times; once was at Pemako in Nyingtri. Palden Sherab's youngest sister, Ting Ting Karmo, died after departing Dudjom Rinpoche's centers in the hills there.

=== India ===
Having just arrived in India, another sister, Yangzom, and his mother died at a refugee camp in Assam. His father and his brother, Khenpo Tsewang Dongyal Rinpoche, survived.

Palden Sherab and his family were moved to a refugee camp in Kalimpong and lived with other Tibetans escaping the Chinese invasion forces. He taught from the Prajnaparamita, and from Mipham Rinpoche's teachings, and taught Tibetan grammar from the Sumtak, daily. The family then moved to a camp in Darjeeling for six months, where Palden Sherab continued teaching from Mipham's commentaries, from Shantideva's Bodhisattvacaryāvatāra or The Way of the Bodhisattva, and from the Sumtak to the exile community.

In Mussoorie in 1965, Dudjom Rinpoche asked him to be the Nyingma representative at a year-long scholarly conference of the four main schools of Tibetan Buddhism, convened by the 14th Dalai Lama. Spiritual leaders of the Kagyu, the Sakya and the Gelug traditions attended as did the Nyingma tradition.

Khunu Tenzin Gyaltsen Rinpoche was the main speaker at the conference that was focused on preserving and protecting Tibet's culture and spiritual heritage. The conference also focused on recovering the sacred Pali, Sanskrit, and early Tibetan Buddhist texts which were missing or were destroyed by China during its invasion. Palden Sherab was responsible for salvaging thousands of texts and commentaries, and the complete Tibetan canon, including the Mahayana and the Vajrayana Buddhist teachings, was recovered.

The Central Institute of Higher Tibetan Studies (later renamed the Central University for Tibetan Studies) resulted from the conference, and opened in Varanasi in 1967 before moving to Sarnath. Palden Sherab was appointed by Dudjom Rinpoche to found the institute and to represent the Nyingma tradition, and he received the Nyingma Kama, the Nyingma Terma and the Guhyagarbha tantra from Dudjom Rinpoche.

For a time, he was the only professor and administrator in the Nyingma department. Palden Sherab taught there for 17 years, up to 13 classes a day during the early years. Dilgo Khyentse Rinpoche and other Nyingma teachers were pleased with his work, and gave him more teaching opportunities. Dilgo Khyentse became one of his root lamas, and Palden Sherab also taught in the Tibetan department of Varanasi's Government Sanskrit College.

=== The West ===
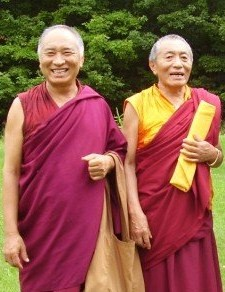
Palden Sherab (right) and his brother, Tsewang Dongyal, at Palden Padma Samye Ling in Sidney, New York

When the iron bird flies and horses run on wheels, the dharma will come to the land of the red man.

— prophecy by Guru Padmasambhava

Palden Sherab first traveled to the United States in 1980 with his brother, Khenpo Tsewang Dongyal Rinpoche, at the behest of Rhoda P. Lecocq of California. In Vermont, connections were established between Dudjom Rinpoche, Palden Sherab and his brother, and Venerable Khandro Dhyani Ywahoo of the Cherokee Nation at the Sunray Meditation Society. The connection fulfills Padmasambhava's prophecy of "when the iron bird flies" and a Hopi prophecy of white brothers wearing a "red cap or red cloak". (Note: Banyacya (1992): "We were told that three helpers who were commissioned by the Great Spirit to help Hopi bring about the peaceful life on earth would appear to help us and that we should not change our homes, our ceremonials, our hair, because the true helpers might not recognize us as the true Hopi. So we have been waiting all these years [...] It is known that our True White Brother, when he comes, will be all powerful and will wear a red cap or red cloak. He will be large in population and belong to no religion but his very own. He will bring with him the sacred stone tablets. With him there will be two great ones, both very wise and powerful.")

In 1981, Palden Sherab taught at Dudjom Rinpoche's Dorje Nyingpo center in Paris. He co-founded Dharma Samudra, a non-profit publishing company in Boulder, Colorado, with his brother four years later. Palden Sherab has written and published a number of works on Tibetan history, biographies of Vajrayana masters, on Tibetan language and grammar, poetry and logic.

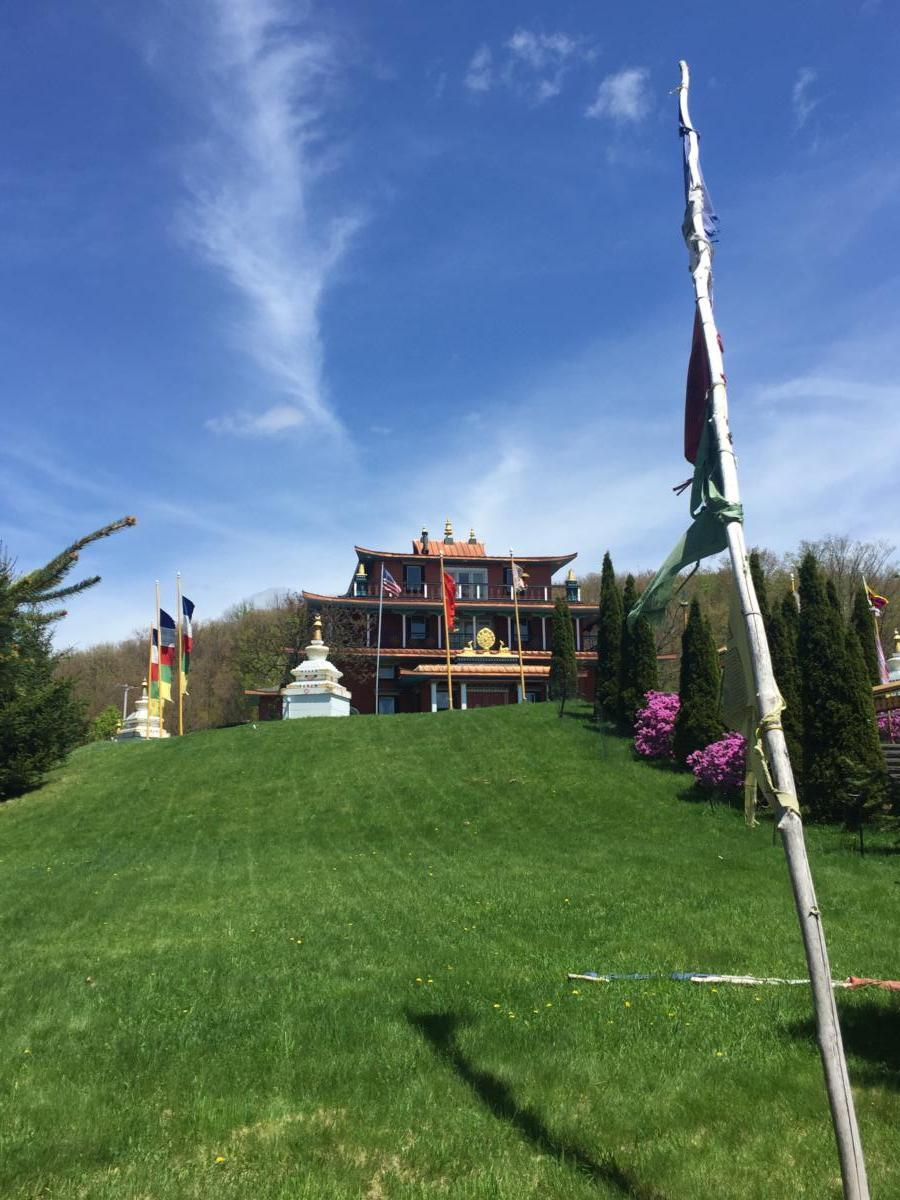
Palden Padma Samye Ling in 2018

In 1989, he and his brother founded the Padmasambhava Buddhist Center. Its main retreat center and monastery is Palden Padma Samye Ling, (Tibetan: དཔལ་ལྡན་པདྨ་བསམ་ཡས་གླིང་, Wylie: dpal ldan pad+ma bsam yas gling) located in Sidney Center, Delaware County, New York. The center has grown to 19 retreat locations and monastic institutions in the US, Puerto Rico, Russia and India.

Palden Sherab directed the design and construction of these projects which include several monasteries, a nunnery, and retreat centers. Land in Sarnath was purchased in 1972, and construction began in 1990 for Padma Samye Chokhor Ling Monastery. The monastery was consecrated in 1995. Palden Sherab met and received teachings from Khenchen Jigme Phuntsok during his 1990s travels to the West.

The first Buddhist nunnery in Sarnath at Deer Park, where the Buddha first gave teachings, is Orgyen Samye Chokhor Ling Nunnery which was opened by Palden Sherab in March 2003 and was consecrated on 12 November 2006 by the Maha Bodhi Society and other Buddhist institutions. Then in 2004 at Jetavan Grove in Shravasti, where the Buddha spent the rainy seasons in retreat and performed miracles, Palden Sherab rebuilt a memorial stupa which is called the Miracle Stupa for World Peace. Palden Sherab died on 19 June 2010 at Palden Padma Samye Ling.

=== Reincarnation ===
The search for the yangsi (reincarnation) of Palden Sherab was undertaken. He was located in Nepal, where he was born. In 2019, he was enthroned in India by Terton Namkha Drimed Rabjam Rinpoche, and given the name Palden Yonten Thaye Lodro Chokyi Gyaltsen. His seat is the Orgyen Samye Chokhor Ling Nunnery in India.

== Teachers ==
An abbreviated list of Palden Sherab's mostly Nyingma tradition teachers from Tibet, India and the U.S. include:

- Dudjom Jigdral Yeshe Dorje
- Kyabje Penor Rinpoche
- Dilgo Khyentse Tashi Paljor
- 14th Dalai Lama
- Khenchen Jigme Phuntsok
- Dzigar Kongtrul Lodro Rabphel
- Chatral Rinpoche

== Lineages ==
An abbreviated listing of the lineages that Palden Sherab holds include:

- Mipham Rinpoche's primary textual lineage.
- Kalachakra Tantra by the 14th Dalai Lama
- Chetsun Nyingtik by Penor Rinpoche
- Riwoche Monastery's collected teachings
- Katok Monastery's Jamgon Mipham Rinpoche's collected teachings
- Terton Tsasum Lingpa's primary lineage holder
- Nyingma tradition Kama (oral) lineage and Terma lineages

== Works ==
=== English-language commentaries ===
- Prajnaparamita: The Six Perfections. Sky Dancer Press, 1990. ISBN 1-880975-00-9
- The Commentary on Mipham's Sherab Raltri: The Blazing Lights of the Sun and Moon. Translated by Khenpo Tsewang Dongyal. Transcribed by Turtle Hill Sangha
- The Commentary on Mipham's Sherab Raltri Entitled: The Blazing Lights of the Sun and Moon. Dharma Samudra, 1997.
- The Smile of Sun and Moon: A Commentary on the Praise to the Twenty-One Taras. Translated by Anna Orlova. Sky Dancer Press, 2004. ISBN 1-880975-07-6
- Door to Inconceivable Wisdom and Compassion. With Khenpo Tsewang Dongyal. Sky Dancer Press, 1996.
- Lion's Gaze: A Commentary on Tsig Sum Nedek. With Khenpo Tsewang Dongyal. Sky Dancer Press, 1998. ISBN 1-880975-05-X
- Ceaseless Echoes of Great Silence. With Khenpo Tsewang Dongyal. Sky Dancer Press, 1999. ISBN 1-880975-02-5
- Opening To Our Primordial Nature. With Khenpo Tsewang Dongyal. Snow Lion Publications, 2006. ISBN 1-55939-249-5
- Tara's Enlightened Activity: An Oral Commentary on The Twenty-one Praises to Tara. With Khenpo Tsewang Dongyal. Snow Lion Publications, 2007. ISBN 1-55939-287-8
- Illuminating the Path: Ngondro Instructions According to the Nyingma School of Vajrayana Buddhism. With Khenpo Tsewang Dongyal. Padmasambhava Buddhist Center, 2008.
- The Dark Red Amulet: Oral Instructions of the Practice of Vajrakilaya. With Khenpo Tsewang Dongyal. Snow Lion Publications, 2008. ISBN 1-55939-311-4
- Beauty of Awakened Mind: Dzogchen Lineage of Shigpo Dudtsi. With Khenpo Tsewang Dongyal. Dharma Samudra, 2013.
- Mipham's Sword of Wisdom: The Nyingma Approach to Valid Cognition . Translated by Ann Helm, Somerville: Wisdom Publications, 2018.

=== Padma Samye Ling Shedra texts ===
- Opening the Clear Vision of the Vaibhashika and Sautrantika Schools. With Khenpo Tsewang Dongyal. PSL Shedra Series, Volume 1. Dharma Samudra, 2007.
- Opening the Clear Vision of the Mind Only School. With Khenpo Tsewang Dongyal. PSL Shedra Series, Volume 2. Dharma Samudra, 2007.
- Opening the Wisdom Door of the Madhyamaka School. With Khenpo Tsewang Dongyal. PSL Shedra Series, Volume 3. Dharma Samudra, 2008.
- Opening the Wisdom Door of the Rangtong and Shentong Views: A Brief Explanation of the One Taste of the Second and Third Turnings of the Wheel of Dharma. With Khenpo Tsewang Dongyal. PSL Shedra Series, Volume 4. Dharma Samudra, 2009.
- Opening the Wisdom Door of the Outer Tantras: Refining Awareness Through Ascetic Ritual and Purification Practice. With Khenpo Tsewang Dongyal. PSL Shedra Series, Volume 5. Dharma Samudra, 2009.
- Splendid Presence of the Great Guhyagarbha: Opening the Wisdom Door of the King of All Tantras. With Khenpo Tsewang Dongyal. PSL Shedra Series, Volume 6. Dharma Samudra, 2011.
- Key to Opening the Wisdom Door of Anuyoga. With Khenpo Tsewang Dongyal. PSL Shedra Series, Volume 7. Dharma Samudra, 2015.
- Turning the Wisdom Wheel of the Nine Golden Chariots. From a 1987 lecture in Australia by Khenchen Palden Sherab, oral translation by Khenpo Tsewang Dongyal. PSL Shedra Series, Volume 8. Dharma Samudra, 2011.

=== Tibetan-language commentaries ===
- Radiant Light of the Sun & Moon. Commentary on Jamgon Mipham Rinpoche's Sword of Wisdom that Ascertains Reality. Central University of Tibetan Studies: Sarnath, 1986
- Palden Sherab's Tibetan-language commentaries, and his Tibetan language biography, have been collected in three ebook volumes entitled, Collected Works of Khenchen Palden Sherab Rinpoche.

=== Spanish-language commentaries ===
- With Khenpo Tsewang Dongyal. La Luz del Dharma. Dharma Samudra, 2011.
- Echos Incesantes del Gran Silencio: Un Comentario sobre la Prajñāpāramitā del Sūtra del Corazón. Dharma Samudra, 2019. ISBN 978-84-7245-522-1
