= Kunzang Dekyong Wangmo =

Sera Khandro Kunzang Dekyong Wangmo
- སེ་ར་མཁའ་འགྲོ་ཀུན་བཟང་བདེ་སྐྱོང་དབང་མོ།
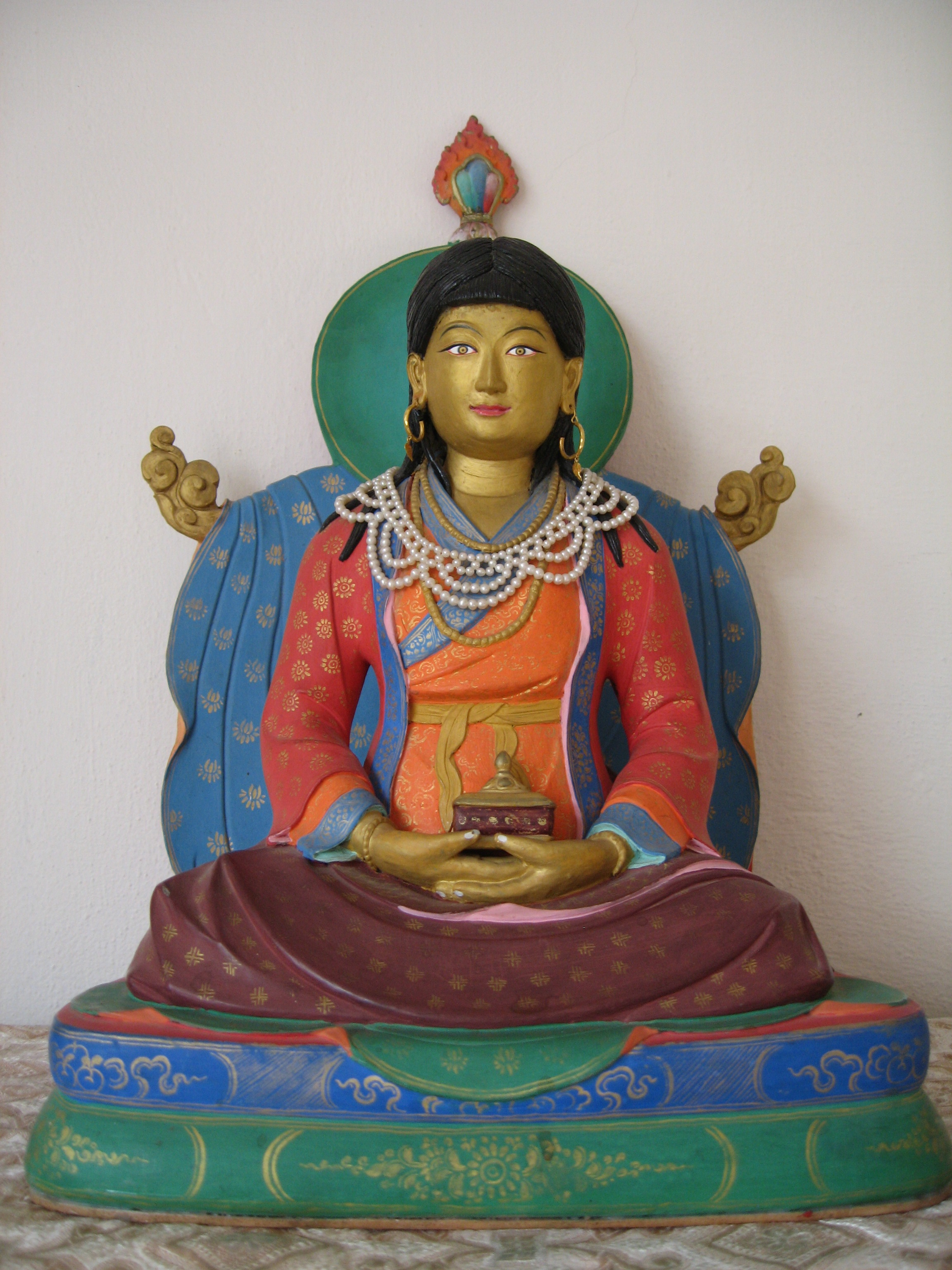
- A statue of Sera Khandro

Personal life
- Born: 1892
- Died: 1940 (aged 47–48)
- Other names: Bde-baʼi-rdo-rje, mDo-med mkhaʼ-spyod, dBus-bzaʼ mkhaʼ-ʼgro kun- bzang bde-skyong dbang-mo

Religious life
- Religion: Buddhist
- Temple: Sera Tekchen Chokhorling
- Lineage: Nyingma

Senior posting
- Reincarnation: Yeshe Tsogyal
- Students: Dudjom Jigdral Yeshe Dorje, Chatral Sangye Dorje

Sera Khandro Kunzang Dekyong Wangmo (1892–1940) or Sera Kandro is considered an emanation of Yeshe Tsogyal, and in her lifetime was a Tertön of Tibetan Buddhist Vajrayana, a biographer and autobiographer, and a highly respected teacher. She taught Dudjom Rinpoche, Chatral Rinpoche, and the First Adzom Drukpa, Drodul Pawo Dorje, among other high lamas.

Sera Khandro was born into a rich family, but ran away at the age of 14 to escape an unwanted engagement, and to follow the Vajrayana teacher Drime Ozer, who was then in Lhasa on pilgrimage from Golok in Eastern Tibet. She returned with him and his students to Golok, where she lived as a renunciate. There, Sera Khandro became life partners with Garra Gyelse.

Garra Gyelsel disliked her Terma revelations, and this caused Sera Khandro to become sick. Her health returned when she left and returned to Drime Ozer with whom she subsequently revealed the specific treasure scriptures, or Terma, for which Sera Khandro is known. From when she was young she had experienced visions of Vajravarahi and exhibited many confirming indications of being a treasure revealer, a Terton. This meant that Sera Khandro had karmic connections with hidden treasures of the Nyingma Terma lineage, and to those which concealed the Termas, eighth-century Vajrayana master Padmasambhava and his consort and Vajrayana master Yeshe Tsogyal.

Sera Khandro was a teacher to many high Nyingma lamas, including Dudjom Jigdral Yeshe Dorje and Chatral Sangye Dorje.

She is considered an emanation of Yeshe Tsogyal.

In Sarah H. Jacoby's Love and Liberation: Autobiographical Writings of the Tibetan Buddhist Visionary Sera Khandro (New York: Columbia University Press, 2014), the author wrote Khandro was "one of the few Tibetan women to record the story of her life." Khandro also wrote the biography of her guru, Drimé Özer, son of the Terton Dudjom Lingpa.

== Selected works ==
- (in English) Khandro, Sera. Refining Our Perception of Reality: Sera Khandro's Commentary on Dudjom Lingpa's Account of His Visionary Journey. Shambhala Publications. p. 456. ISBN 978-0231147699.
