= Tharchin Rinpoche =

Buddhist lama of the Nyingma school (1936–2013)

Lama Tsedrup Tharchin Rinpoche (Tibetan: བླ་མ་ཚེ་སྒྲུབ་ཐར་ཕྱིན་, Wylie: bla ma tshe sgrub thar phyin, THL: lama tsédrup tarchin) (1936–July 22, 2013) was a Tibetan Dzogchen master in the Nyingma school of Tibetan Buddhism. He was tenth holder of the family lineage known as the Repkong Ngakpas.

== Early life and education ==
Tharchin Rinpoche was born in southern Tibet in the region of Kongpo. He trained with Nyingma master Dudjom Rinpoche, head of the Nyingma school, at his monastery in Kongpo, Lamaling Monastery. He completed both a five-year and three-year retreat. His other teachers included Chatral Rinpoche, Thinley Norbu Rinpoche, and Sherab Dorje Rinpoche.

In 1960, he fled Tibet on foot, and lived with his family in India and Nepal for the next 24 years.

== Teaching career ==
In 1984 he moved to the United States and, after being asked by his teacher Dudjom Rinpoche to teach, founded the Vajrayana Foundation and began to teach Tibetan Buddhist dharma in America, where he established a retreat center, Pema Ösel Ling, in Northern California.

== Death ==
Tharchin Rinpoche suffered a sudden heart attack and died on July 22, 2013.
