= Hospital Area =

- District of Thimphu
- Country: Bhutan
- District: Thimphu District
- City: Thimphu

Hospital Area is a central district of Thimphu, Bhutan. Located south of the Memorial Chorten, it contains the central roundabout, JDWR Hospital and the Royal Bhutan Police national headquarters. The Gongphel Lam road divides it from Changzamthok district.
