= Thinley Norbu =

Tibetan Buddhist lama (1931–2011)

Kyabje Dungse Thinley Norbu Rinpoche (Tibetan: ཕྲིན་ལས་ནོར་བུ།, Wylie: phrin las nor bu, THL: Trinlé Norbu; Chinese: 聽列諾布) (1931 – December 26, 2011) was a major modern teacher in the Nyingma lineage of Tibetan Buddhism, and patron of the Vajrayana Foundation. He was the eldest son of Dudjom Rinpoche, the former head of the Nyingma lineages, and also the father of Dzongsar Jamyang Khyentse Rinpoche and Dungse Garab Rinpoche. His association with the Dudjom Lineage is a long one: he is held to be the incarnation of Tulku Drime Oser, who was one of seven sons of Dudjom Lingpa. He also was considered to be an emanation of Longchen Rabjam, the great 14th-century Nyingma scholar and siddha who composed the Seven Treasuries. He died in California on December 26, 2011, according to the Tibetan Buddhist Lunar Calendar the 2nd day of the 11th month of the Iron Rabbit year. His cremation was held in a public buddhist cremation ceremony in Paro, Bhutan on March 3, 2012, which was attended by an estimated 15,000 people, including some of Bhutan's royal family.

== Biography ==
Dungse Thinley Norbu Rinpoche was born in 1931 in Lhasa, Tibet. In his autobiography he states: "I was born in Lhasa, between east and west, in the center, near the Rasa Trulnang Tsuklakhang (Temple of Miraculous Goat-Earth Phenomena) in Lhasa, known as the Jokhang Temple."

His father was the renowned Nyingma Buddhist master Dudjom Jigdral Yeshe Dorje, and his mother was Kusho Tseten Yudron. In his youth in Tibet, he studied for nine years at Mindrolling Monastery, one of the six major monasteries of the Nyingma school in Tibet. He received many teachings from many great saints throughout the region, besides his own father.

In the mid-1950s, Thinley Norbu left Tibet at the time of the Battle of Chamdo. Having fled his homeland, he spent some time in Bhutan, where his children were born. There he served as the chief architect of the Thimphu Memorial Chorten, built in 1974 under the guidance of his father, to honor the memory of the Third King of Bhutan, Jigme Dorji Wangchuck (1928–72).

Thinley Norbu first came to the United States of America in the 1970s to seek medical treatment, and then spent a number of years in Nepal before permanently settling in the US in the early 1980s.

In the late 1980s and early 1990s, after spending a number of years in New York City, Thinley Norbu sought out a quiet place for practice in the countryside on the east coast of the United States. After a long search, in 1991 he chose some land in the rolling hills of upstate New York and named it Kunzang Gatshal, Always Noble Joyful Park (Tibetan: ཀུན་བཟང་དགའ་ཚལ།, Wylie: kun bzang dga' tshal). For the next twenty years, Kunzang Gatshal served as Thinley Norbu's primary residence and focal point of dharma activity. He gave teachings to disciples on this land, and was visited by other lamas, including Kyabje Penor Rinpoche and Kyabje Dodrupchen Rinpoche.

In the mid-1990s, Thinley Norbu built a temple on the land, personally directing all aspects of the construction and design until every statue and offering had been set. At around the same time, he founded a school for young children to learn pure dharma tradition and practice, White Lotus School (Tibetan: པདྨ་དཀར་པོ་ཆོས་གྲྭ།, Wylie: padma dkar po chos gr+wa), which he looked after with particular care.

After settling in New York, Thinley Norbu traveled back several times to the East. In 1986, during a lull in Tibet-China relations, he went back to Tibet where he secretly gave many teachings to Tibetan disciples. He also frequently travelled to Pema Osel Ling, California, the center of Lama Tharchin Rinpoche. He helped with the final sculpting of the face of the Guru Rinpoche statue in Pema Osel Ling, and also gave many teachings there, including the full Dudjom Tersar empowerments during the summer of 1995.

Most of his later years were spent at Kunzang Gatshal, giving spoken teachings and writing more than a dozen books, many of which were published posthumously, and several that still remain unpublished. Thinley Norbu's books have become quite popular in the west, but in contrast to many other Tibetan teachers he did not seek publicity or large numbers of students.

In 2009, although in poor health, Thinley Norbu again travelled to Asia, spending several months in Nepal and Bhutan before returning to the US in 2010.

== Death ==
Thinley Norbu died in Palm Desert, California on December 26, 2011, according to the Tibetan and Bhutanese Buddhist Lunisolar Calendar was the 2nd day of the 11th month of the Iron Rabbit year. His body was transported to his temple at Kunzang Gatshal in Delhi, New York where it laid in repose for several weeks for the public to pay their respects, before being flown to Paro, Bhutan and brought around the country so disciples from all corners of Bhutan could pay their respects.

His cremation was held in a public buddhist cremation ceremony attended by an estimated 15,000 people in Paro, Bhutan on March 3, 2012, and presided over by Dudjom Rinpoche III, Sangye Pema Shepa, the reincarnation of Thinley Norbu Rinpoche's father, the second Dudjom Rinpoche II, Jigdral Yeshe Dorje.

A memorial of Thinley Norbu Rinpoche has been built on the site of his cremation in Paro, Bhutan, by his son Dungse Garab Rinpoche.

Since Thinley Norbu Rinpoche's death in 2011, Kunzang Gatshal has been led by the students of White Lotus School, with guidance from his family including Garab Dorje Rinpoche, Tulku Jampal Dorje, Semo Yeshe and Semo Pema.

== Family ==
=== Parents and siblings ===
Thinley Norbu's father was Dudjom Jigdral Yeshe Dorje (English: Fearless Wisdom Vajra). His mother was Mayum Tseten Yudron (English: Turquoise Lamp of Firm Life). Thinley Norbu's parents had seven children:

Semo Dechen Yudron (Tibetan: སྲས་མོ་བདེ་ཆེན་གཡུ་སྒྲོན། English: Turquoise Radiance of Great Bliss.)

Thinley Norbu (Tibetan: ཕྲིན་ལས་ནོར་བུ། English: Jewel of Activity) was the oldest son.

Chokyi Nyima Rinpoche (Tibetan: ཆོས་ཀྱི་ཉི་མ་རིན་པོ་ཆེ། English: Sun of Dharma).

Semo Pema Yudron (Tibetan: སྲས་མོ་པདྨ་གཡུ་སྒྲོན། English: Lotus of Turquoise Light).

Pende Norbu Rinpoche (Tibetan: ཕན་བདེ་ནོར་བུ་རིན་པོ་ཆེ། English: Jewel of Beneficial Well-Being).

Se Dorje Palzang (Tibetan: སྲས་རྡོ་རྗེ་དཔལ་བཟང་། English: Indestructible Noble Glory).

Semo Tsering Yangchen (Tibetan: སྲས་མོ་ཚེ་རིང་དབྱངས་ཅན། English: Melodious Long Life)

When Thinley Norbu was 13 years old his parents separated, and his father later married Sangyum Rigdzin Wangmo (Tibetan: རིགས་འཛིན་དབང་མོ།) giving him four more half-siblings. Dekyong Yeshe Wangmo (Tibetan: བདེ་སྐྱོང་ཡེ་ཤེས་དབང་མོ། ), Chimey Wangmo (Tibetan: འཆི་མེད་དབང་མོ། ), Tsering Penzom (Tibetan: ཚེ་རིང་དཔལ་འཛོམས། ), and Shenphen Dawa Norbu Rinpoche (Tibetan: གཞན་ཕན་ཟླ་བ་ནོར་བུ།) (1950-2018).

=== Wife and children ===
Thinley Norbu's wife was Sangyum Jamyang Chödrön (Tibetan: འཇམ་དབྱང་ཆོས་སྒྲོན། Smooth Melodious Lamp of Dharma), and like his parents they had seven children together, three daughters and four sons.

Semo Kelsang Chodron, Dzongsar Khyentse Norbu Rinpoche (Tibetan: རྫོང་གསར་མཁྱེན་བརྩེ་ནོར་བུ་རིན་པོ་ཆེ།) (b.1961), Semo Yeshe Palzom (b.1964), Garab Dorje Rinpoche (Tibetan: དགའ་རབ་རྡོ་རྗེ་རིན་པོ་ཆེ།) (b.1967), Jampel Dorje Rinpoche (Tibetan: འཇམ་དཔལ་རྡོ་རྗེ་རིན་པོ་ཆེ།) (b.1968), Semo Pema Chokyi (Tibetan: སྲས་མོ་པདྨ་ཆོས་སྐྱིད།) (b.1976), and Se Ugyen Namgyal.

== Works ==
During his exile in the West he wrote a number of books, including many that were published posthumously:

- (1974) Account of the Great Chaitya of Thimbu. Thinley Norbu. Thimphu, Bhutan. LCCN 74901523 (republished in "The Collected Works of Dungse Thinley Norbu Rinpoche, 2009").
- (1984–1989) The Practice of the Essence of the Sublime Heart Jewel, Meditation and Action, The Propitious Speech from the Beginning, Middle and End (Tibetan: ༄༅། །ཐོག་མཐའ་བར་གསུམ་དུ་དགེ་བའི་གཏམ་ལྟ་སྒོམ་སྤྱོད་གསུམ་ཉམས་ལེན་དམ་པའི་སྙིང་ནོར་ཞེས་བྱ་བ་བཞུགས་སོ།།). Written by Patrul Rinpoche, translated by Thinley Norbu. New York, NY: Jewel Publication House. ISBN 0-9607000-6-4.
- (1985) The Small Golden Key to the Treasure of the Various Essential Necessities of General and Extraordinary Buddhist Dharma. Translated by Lisa Anderson (second edition). New York, NY: Jewel Publishing House. ISBN 0-9607000-2-1.
- (1982) Magic Dance: The Display of the Self-Nature of the Five Wisdom Dakinis. ISBN 0-9607000-0-5.
- (1992) White Sail: Crossing the Waves of Ocean Mind to the Serene Continent of the Triple Gems. Boston, MA: Shambhala Publications. ISBN 0-87773-693-6.
- (1997) Welcoming Flowers from Across the Cleansed Threshold of Hope: An Answer to the Pope's Criticism of Buddhism. New York, NY: Jewel Publication House. ISBN 978-0-9607000-5-9.
- (2006, 2008) A Cascading Waterfall of Nectar. Boston, MA: Shambhala Publications. ISBN 978-1-59030-526-3.
- (2009) The Collected Works of Dungse Thinley Norbu Rinpoche (Tibetan: གདུང་སྲས་ཕྲིན་ལས་ནོར་བུའི་གསུང་འབུམ།, Wylie: gdung sras phrin las nor bu'i gsung 'bum; Chinese: 称来诺布文集). Hong Kong, PRC: hong kong gyi ling dpe skrun tshad yod kung si Publications. Volume 1 of 3: ISBN 9789624501667, Volume 2 of 3: ISBN 9789624501711, Volume 3 of 3: ISBN 9789624501728.
- (2012) (Tibetan: བདུད་རྩི་སྨན་གཅིག་མ།, English: The Sole Panacea). KGF Publications. Delhi, NY.
- (2013) The Sole Panacea: A Brief Commentary on the Seven-Line Prayer to Guru Rinpoche That Cures the Suffering of the Sickness of Karma and Defilement (Tibetan: བདུད་རྩི་སྨན་གཅིག་མ།). Boston, MA: Shambhala Publications. ISBN 978-1559394390.
- (2015) A Brief Fantasy History of A Himalayan: Autobiographical Reflections. Boston, MA: Shambhala Publications. ISBN 978-1611802054.
- (2015) Sunlight Speech That Dispels the Darkness of Doubt: Sublime Prayers, Praises, and Practices of the Nyingma Masters. Boston, MA: Shambhala Publications. ISBN 978-1570622441.
- (2016) Gypsy Gossip and Other Advice. Boulder, CO: Shambhala Publications. ISBN 978-1611802085.
- (2016) Echoes: The Boudhanath Teachings. Boulder, CO: Shambhala Publications. ISBN 978-1611803020.
- (2021) Sunlight Speech That Dispels the Darkness of Doubt: Sublime Prayers, Praises, and Practices of the Nyingma Masters. Trans. Thinley Norbu. Boulder, CO: Shambhala Publications. ISBN 978-1611809732.
- (2021) (Tibetan: བདུད་རྩིའི་ཐིག་ཕྲེང།, English: The Unbroken Lineage Rosary of Continuously Descending Nectar). KGF Publications. Delhi, NY. ISBN 978-0-578-90505-1.
- (2022) The Ruby Rosary: Joyfully Accepted by Vidyadharas and Dakinis as the Ornament of a Necklace (Tibetan: སྐུ་ཕྲེང་གསོལ་འདེབས་མུཀྟི་ཀའི་དོ་ཤལ།). Boston, MA: Shambhala Publications. ISBN 978-1559394574.
