= Tala Monastery =

Buddhist monastery in Bhutan

Religion
- Affiliation: Tibetan Buddhism

Location
- Location: Bhutan
- Country: Bhutan

Tala Monastery is a Buddhist monastery in Thimphu in Bhutan. It is 7 km southeast of National Memorial Chorten.

== See also ==
- Buddhism in Bhutan
- Transport in Bhutan
- Tourism in Bhutan
