= Khenpo Ngawang Pelzang =

Khenpo Ngawang Palzang (Tibetan: མཁན་པོ་ངག་དབང་དཔལ་བཟང་, Wylie: mkhan po ngag dbang dpal bzang), also known as Khenpo Ngagchung, is considered by the Tibetan tradition to be an emanation of Vimalamitra.

His teacher was the master Nyoshul Lungtok Tenpai Nyima (1829–1901), an incarnation of the abbot Shantarakshita, who spent twenty-eight years in the company of Patrul Rinpoche, receiving all the Nyingtik teachings, practicing them under his orientation and attaining the utmost accomplishment of the Great Perfection.

It is said that even as a baby he displayed supernatural powers and had visions of deities. From his early teens he was kept under the guidance of Tenpai Nyima. He completed all the stages of the practice – the preliminaries, sadhana recitations, yogas, and the two aspects of the Great Perfection, trekchö and thögal.

Fully realized in the Longchen Nyingtik teachings, he is the author of the book The Guide to the Words of My Perfect Teacher, a theoretical explanation of The Words of My Perfect Teacher, written by Patrul Rinpoche, the main master of Tenpai Nyima, his root lama. His activity in benefiting beings has extended to the West, as his book is now available to the English-speaking world. This fact was predicted by Khenpo in a dream recounted to his teacher. In it he saw an immense stupa being destroyed and washed away by a river flowing west into the ocean, and he heard a voice from the sky declaring that millions of beings in that ocean would be benefited. Tenpai Nyima later explained that this dream predicted the destruction of the doctrine in the East and its spread to the West.

Ngawang Pelzang was a holder of Nyingtik tradition and had many disciples, among them Nyoshul Shedrup Tenpai Nyima, Golok Khenchen Munsel Rinpoche, Jamyang Khyentse Chökyi Lodrö and Chatral Rinpoche.

== Bibliography ==
- Pelzang, Khenpo Ngawang. A Guide to the Words of My Perfect Teacher. Translated by Dipamkara with the Padmakara Translation Group. Boston, 2004.
- Rinpoche, Chatral. Compassionate Action. Ithaca, NY: Snow Lion Publications, 2007. Edited, Introduced and Annotated by Zach Larson.
- Nyoshul Khenpo, A Marvelous Garland of Rare Gems: Biographies of Masters of Awareness in the Dzogchen Lineage, Padma Publications, 2005, pp. 247–256
- Smith, E. Gene, 'The Autobiography of the Rnying ma pa Visionary Mkhan po Ngag dbang dpal bzang and his Spiritual Heritage' in Among Tibetan Texts, Wisdom, 2001
- Tulku Thondup, Masters of Meditation and Miracles, edited by Harold Talbott, Boston: Shambhala, 1996, pp. 266–274
