= Riwoche Monastery =

Tibetan Buddhist monastery in Riwoche County, Tibet, China

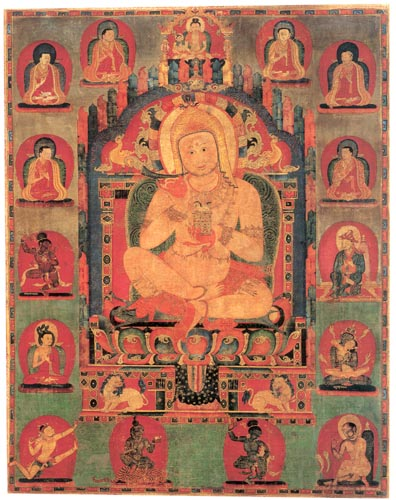
- The Jnapatapa 14th-century cloth depiction of the abbot of Riwoche Monastery.

- Location within Tibet

Religion
- Affiliation: Tibetan Buddhism
- Sect: Taklung Kagyu

Location
- Location: Riwoqê County, Chamdo Prefecture, known as Kham, Tibet
- Country: China
- Interactive map of Riwoche Monastery
- Coordinates: 31°09′N 96°29′E

Architecture
- Founder: Sangye On
- Established: 1276; 750 years ago

Riwoche Monastery, or Riwoche Tsukla Khang Tragyelma (Tib. ri-bo-che; Ch. Leiwuqi Si) is a Taklung Kagyu monastery of the Kagyu school of Tibetan Buddhism. It was founded in 1276 by Sangye On, and is one of the oldest and largest monasteries in eastern Tibet. A highly respected Kham regional monastery, it's also famous for its philosophers and logicians, and for the red, black and white painted tree-trunk columns.

Riwoche Monastery is situated 29 km north of the small town of Ratsaka (also known as Riwoche Town), and 134 km west of Chamdo in Kham. It is at an altitude of about 3,400 metres (11,152 ft) in a fertile valley containing the Dzi River, a tributary to the Mekong River.

== History ==
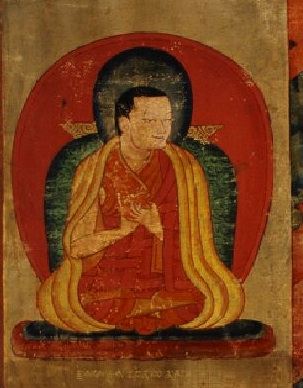
Sanggye On Drakpa Pel, founder of Riwoche Monastery

Riwoche was founded in 1276 CE by Sangye On, who was a student of Sangye Yarjon, the third lineage-holder of the Taklung branch of the Kagyu School of Tibetan Buddhism, and Abbot of Taklung Monastery. He had promised the abbot's chair to two nephews, Onpo (1251–1296) and Mangalaguru. When Yarjon died, Onpo, just a young man, assumed the hierarch's position for one year. His older cousin, Mangalaguru (1231–1297), later took control of the monastery. Later, Onpu's disciple Choku Orgyan Gonpo (1293–1366), became second abbot of Riwoche.

It became the main branch of the Taklung Kagyu in Kham and, according to Go Lotsawa, the author of the Blue Annals, it once had as many as 2,000 monks, and held the greatest reputation among Khampa monasteries. Riwoche Monastery is also famous for its monks' capabilities in philosophy and in logic.

From the time of its founding, the Taklung lineage was divided into "upper" and "lower" branches, Riwoche forming the "lower" branch. Today there are 305 monks residing at Riwoche Monastery.

== Description ==
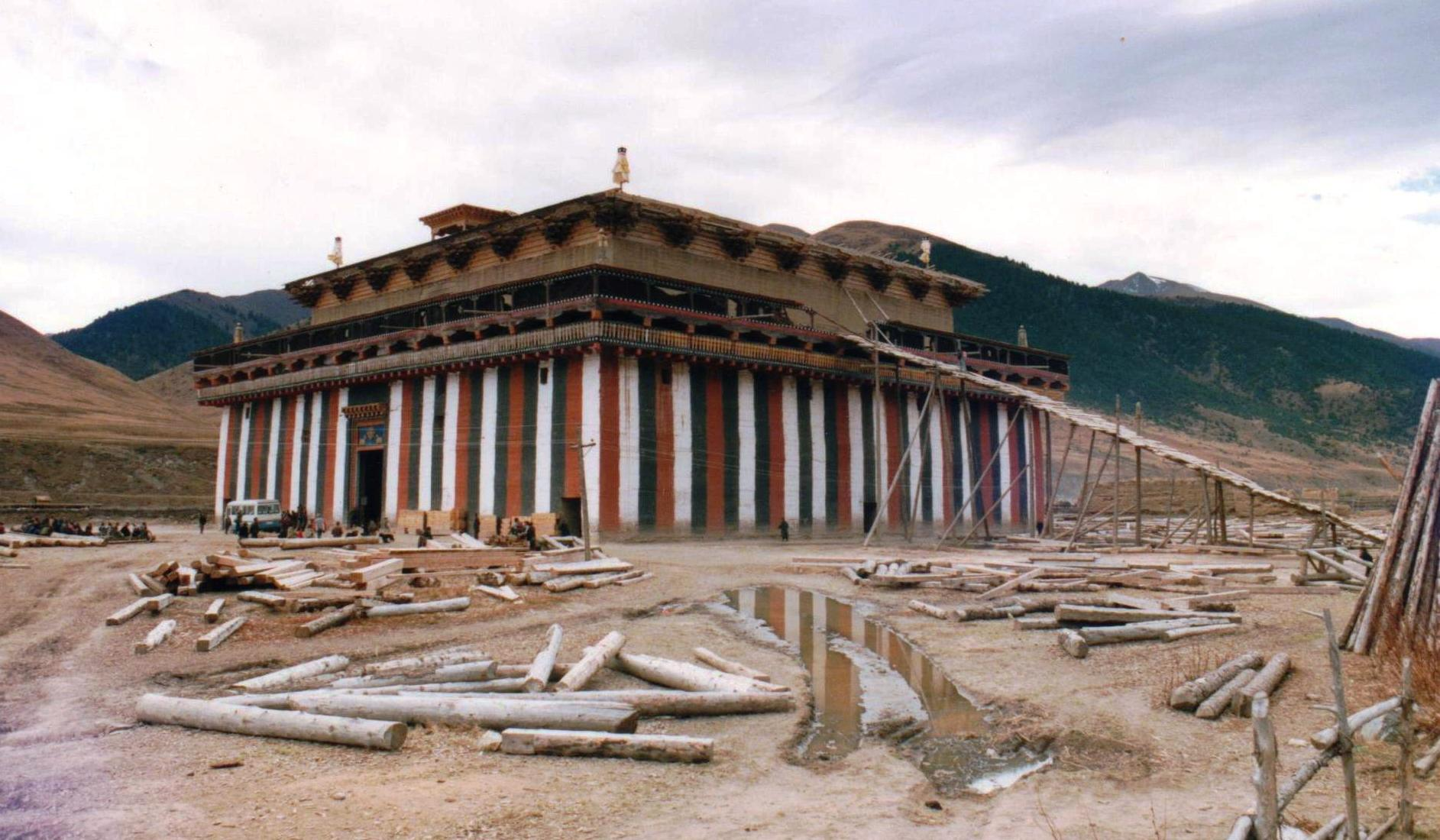
Riwoche Monastery in 1988, under reconstruction. Photo: S Jones

The main temple is three-storied and has been undergoing restoration since 1985, after its earlier destruction by Chinese communists. It is very imposing, supported by huge tree trunks and painted in black red and white vertical stripes, which is distinctive of the Taklung lineage. The monastery contained a notable 14th-century cloth painting entitled Jnanatapa which was unearthed in recent years. The central figure depicts the Onpo Lama Rinpoche and the spiritual lineage of Riwoche monastery.

The surrounding community of practitioners includes both members of the Kagyu and Nyingma schools, some of whom are married.
