= Ngakpa =

Ordained practitioner in Tibetan Buddhism

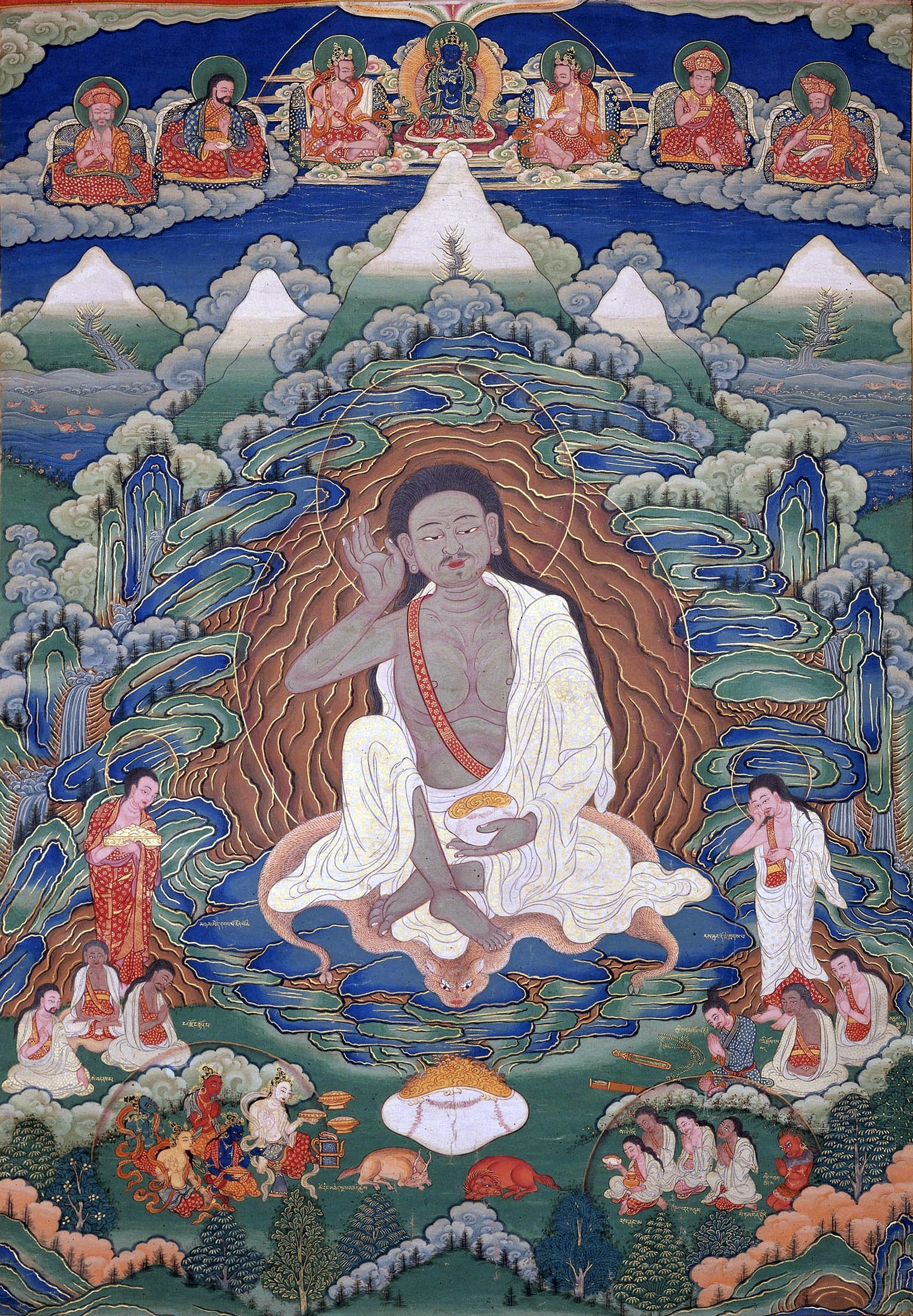
Milarepa, wearing the distinctive white shawl (zen) of a ngakpa

In Tibetan Buddhism and Bon, a ngakpa (male), or a ngakma (female) (Tibetan: སྔགས་པ་, Wylie: sngags pa; Sanskrit mantrī) is any practitioner of Vajrayana who is not a monk or a nun. The term translates to "man or woman of mantra" or "man or woman of secret mantra". They are often referred to as "householder yogis" or "yoginis" because they maintain a householder lifestyle while engaging in advanced tantric practices.

Ngakpas are known for their commitment to the Vajrayana or Tantric Buddhist path, which involves utilizing advanced meditation techniques, rituals, mantras, and visualizations to achieve enlightenment in one lifetime. They are often recognized by their distinctive attire, which may include special robes, ornaments, and ritual objects. Traditionally, many Nyingma ngakpas wear uncut hair and white robes and these are sometimes called "the white-robed and uncut-hair group" (Wylie: gos dkar lcang lo'i sde). The Nyingma school's red sangha are the ordained monks and nuns.

In Tibetan society, ngakpas hold a respected and important role as spiritual practitioners and often serve as intermediaries between the monastic community and the lay population. They play a crucial role in preserving and transmitting the teachings of Tibetan Buddhism, particularly those related to tantric practices. In Bhutan, and some other parts of the Himalayas, the term gomchen is the term most often used to refer to this type of Vajrayana practitioner.

== Definition ==
Matthieu Ricard defines ngakpa simply as "a practitioner of the Secret Mantrayana". Gyurme Dorje defines ngakpa (mantrin) as "a practitioner of the mantras, who may live as a householder rather than a renunciate monk." A ngakpa is thoroughly immersed and engaged in the practice of the teachings under the guidance of a lineage-holder. They have received the esoteric transmissions and empowerments (wang, lung, and thri) and have taken the associated vows (samaya). Significant lineage transmission is through oral lore.

== Description ==
Ngakpas are known for their commitment to the Vajrayana or Tantric Buddhist path, which involves utilizing advanced meditation techniques, rituals, mantras, and visualizations to achieve enlightenment in one lifetime. They are often recognized by their distinctive attire, which may include special robes, ornaments, and ritual objects. Ngakpas often marry and have children. Some work in the world, though they devote significant time to retreat and practice and in enacting rituals when requested by, or on behalf of, members of the community.

According to Kunzang Dorje Rinpoche,

There are two types of ngakpas – those of family lineage (rigs rgyud) and those of Dharma lineage (chos rgyud). Ngakpa family lineages are passed from father ngakpa to their sons from generation to generation. At present, these are family lineage holders such as the great lamas of the Nyingma tradition, Minling Trichen Rinpoche and Sakya Trizin, the throne holder of the Dharma Potrang lineage.

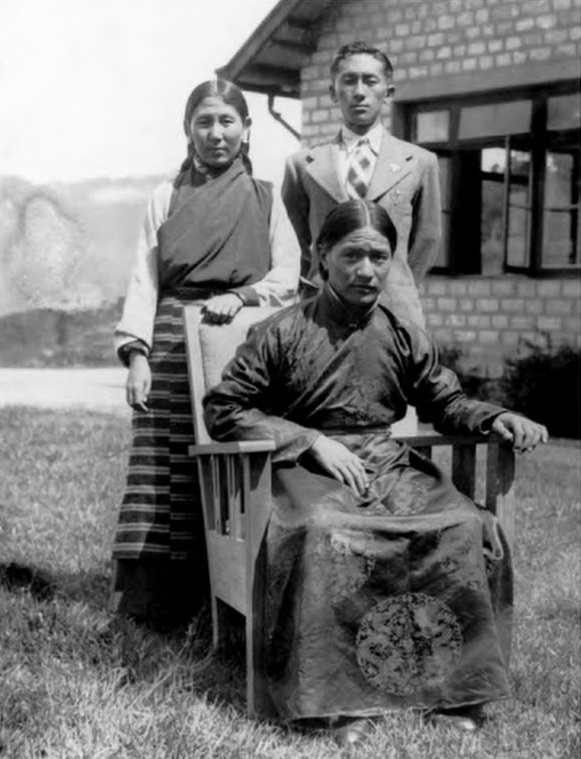
Ngakpa Dudjom Jigdral Yeshe Dorje (front)

Tibetan Buddhism contains two systems of ordination, the familiar monastic ordinations and the less well known ngakpa or Tantric ordinations. Family lineage ngakpas are all members of the non-celibate wing of ordained sangha, with the practice of a particular yidam being passed through the family lineage.

== History ==
Sam van Schaik writes that the "tantric practitioner (sngags pa, Skt. māntrin) became a common figure in Tibet, and would remain so throughout the history of Tibetan Buddhism."

Labrang Monastery, a major Gelug monastery founded in 1709 in Amdo, has a ngakpa college (Wylie: sngags pa grwa tshang) located nearby the main monastery at Sakar village.

== Notable ngakpa ==
Kunga Gyaltsen, the father of the 2nd Dalai Lama, was a ngakpa and a famous Nyingma tantric master. His mother was Machik Kunga Pemo; they were a farming family. Their lineage transmission was by birth.

Dudjom Rinpoche, who was the Supreme Head of the Nyingma school, was a ngakpa.

== See also ==
- Aro gTér
- Category:Ngakpa
