= Thubten Chökyi Dorje, 5th Dzogchen Rinpoche =

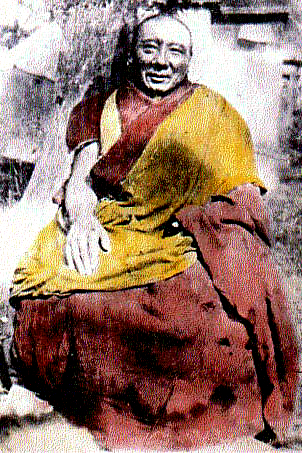

Thubten Chökyi Dorje (Tibetan: ཐུབ་བསྟན་ཆོས་ཀྱི་རྡོ་རྗེ་, Wylie: thub bstan chos kyi rdo rje, 1872–1935) was the 5th Dzogchen Rinpoche of Tibet in the Nyingma sect of Tibetan Buddhism.

There is evidence to suggest that Thubten Chökyi Dorje was held in high regard by his peers and was regarded as an authority in the recognizing reincarnated lamas from all the schools of Tibetan Buddhism. He is credited with affirming the reincarnation of over 200 tulkus during his lifetime.
