= Memorial Chorten, Thimphu =

Memorial Stupa in Thimphu, Bhutan

Memorial Chorten
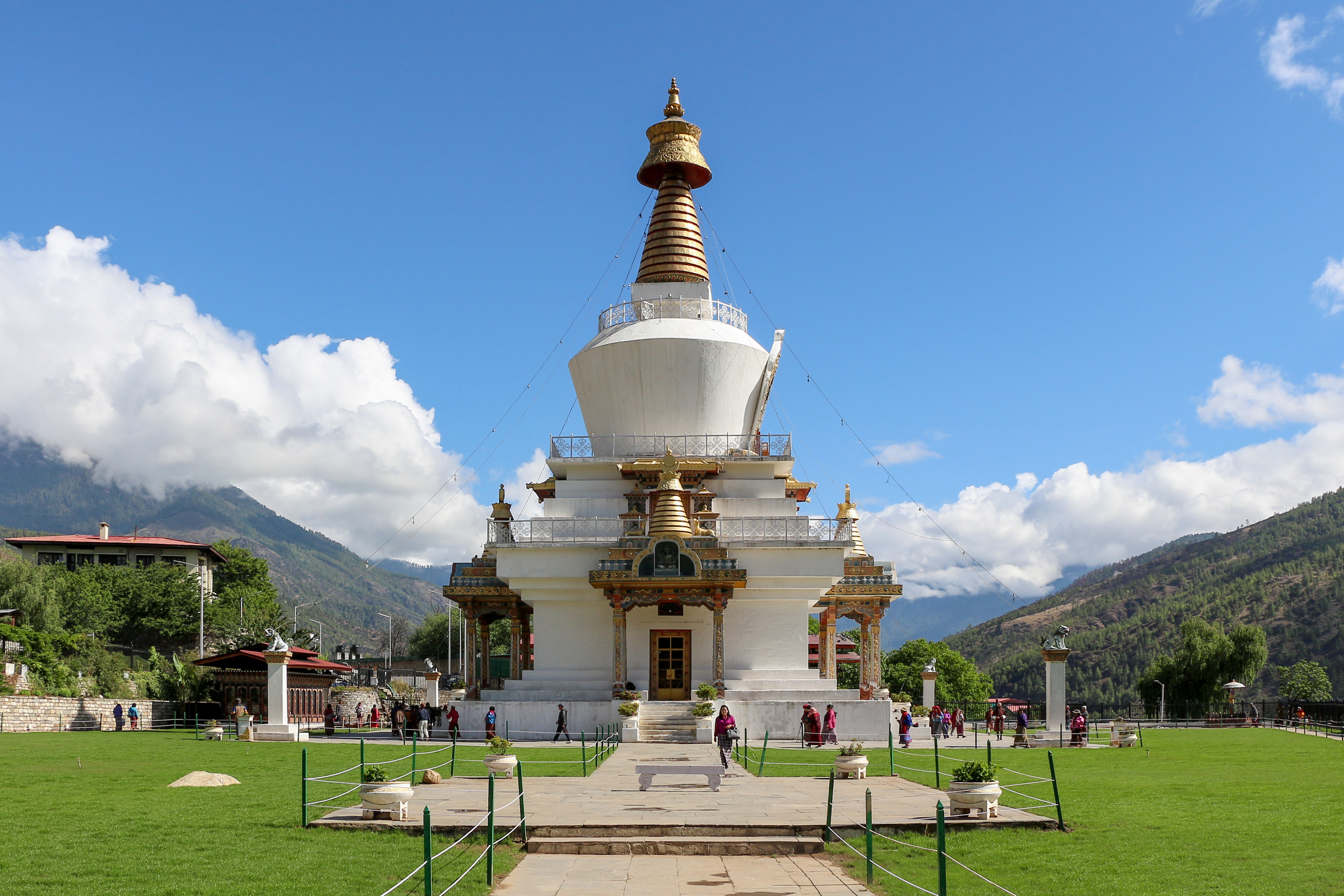
- National Memorial Chorten

Religion
- Affiliation: Tibetan Buddhism
- Sect: Nyingma
- Deity: Jigme Dorji Wangchuck

Location
- Location: Doeboom Lam, Thimphu
- Country: Bhutan
- Interactive map of Memorial Chorten
- Coordinates: 27°27′59″N 89°38′16″E

Architecture
- Founder: Thinley Norbu
- Established: 1974; 52 years ago

The Memorial Chorten is a stupa (Dzongkha chöten, cheten) in Thimphu, Bhutan, located near Desuung Headquarters and above Royal Bhutan Police Headquarters. The stupa, built in 1974 to honor the third Druk Gyalpo, Jigme Dorji Wangchuck (1928–1972), is 108 feet tall (about 33 meters) and a prominent landmark in the city with its golden spires and bells. In 2008, it underwent extensive renovation. It is popularly known as "the most visible religious landmark in Bhutan". It was consecrated by Dudjom Jigdral Yeshe Dorje.

This stupa is unlike others as it does not enshrine human remains. Only the Druk Gyalpo’s photo in a ceremonial dress adorns a hall in the ground floor. His mother, Queen Ashi Phuntsho Choden Wangchuck, built this in his memory.

== History ==
The Memorial Chorten of Thimphu was conceived by Dungsey Rinpoche Thinley Norbu Rinpoche (1931–2011), according to the Nyingma tradition of Tibetan Buddhism. It was erected in 1974 in memory of Jigme Dorji Wangchuck, 3rd Druk Gyalpo, who had died in 1972. The main patron was the Druk Gyalpo's mother, Phuntsho Choden, who requested Meymey Lama Sonam Zangpo to carry out the work. Since he was engaged with other work, he had his son-in-law Dungsey Rinpoche Thinley Norbu carry out the project.

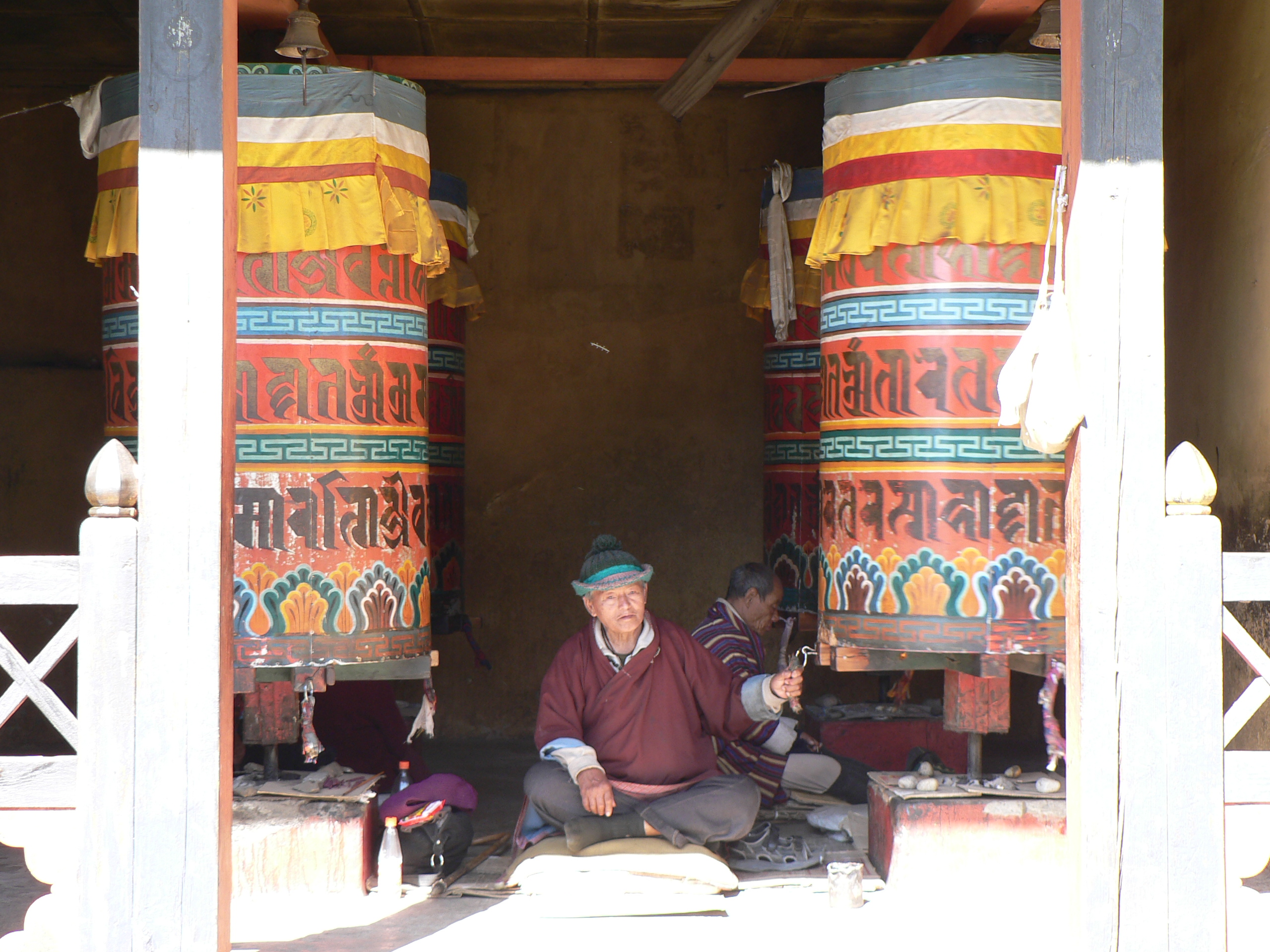
Prayer wheels

== Architecture ==
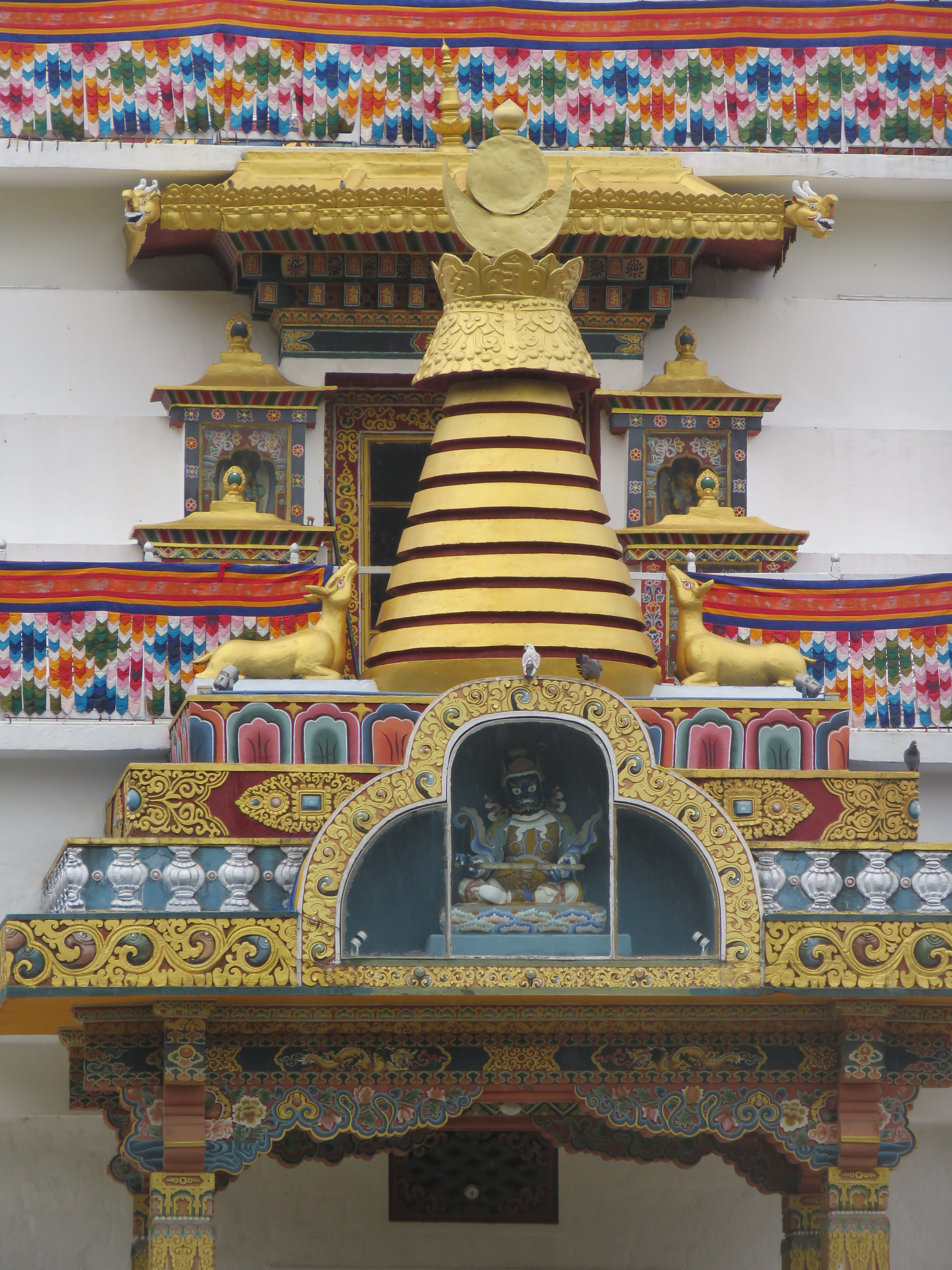
golden spire above the front porch.

The architecture of the chorten has been designed to present it as “one of the most visible religious structures in Thimphu”. The Memorial Chorten, in the heart of the city, is designed as a Tibetan-style chorten, also called a Jangchup chorten, patterned on the design of a classical stupa, with a pyramidal pillar crowned by a crescent moon and sun. The feature that is distinct here is the outward flaring of the rounded part to give the shape of a vase (a pyramidal shape), rather than a dome shape. The chorten depicts larger-than-life-size images of wrathful deities with their female consorts in large numbers, many in yab-yum sexual poses (one count puts the number of such images at 36).

=== Exterior ===
The chorten is a large white structure with a golden spire crowning it and a smaller golden spire above the front porch. It is approached through a small garden and a gate decorated with three slate carvings. On the exterior of the gate are representations of the three protective bodhisattvas: Avalokiteśvara, the symbol of compassion; Mañjuśrī, the symbol of knowledge; and Vajrapāṇi, the symbol of power. On the interior are slates engraved with the image of Ngawang Namgyal, Gautama Buddha and Padmasambhava. Large prayer wheels are located to the left. It has four entrances, but only one entrance is open for devotees to visit the shrine.

=== Interior ===
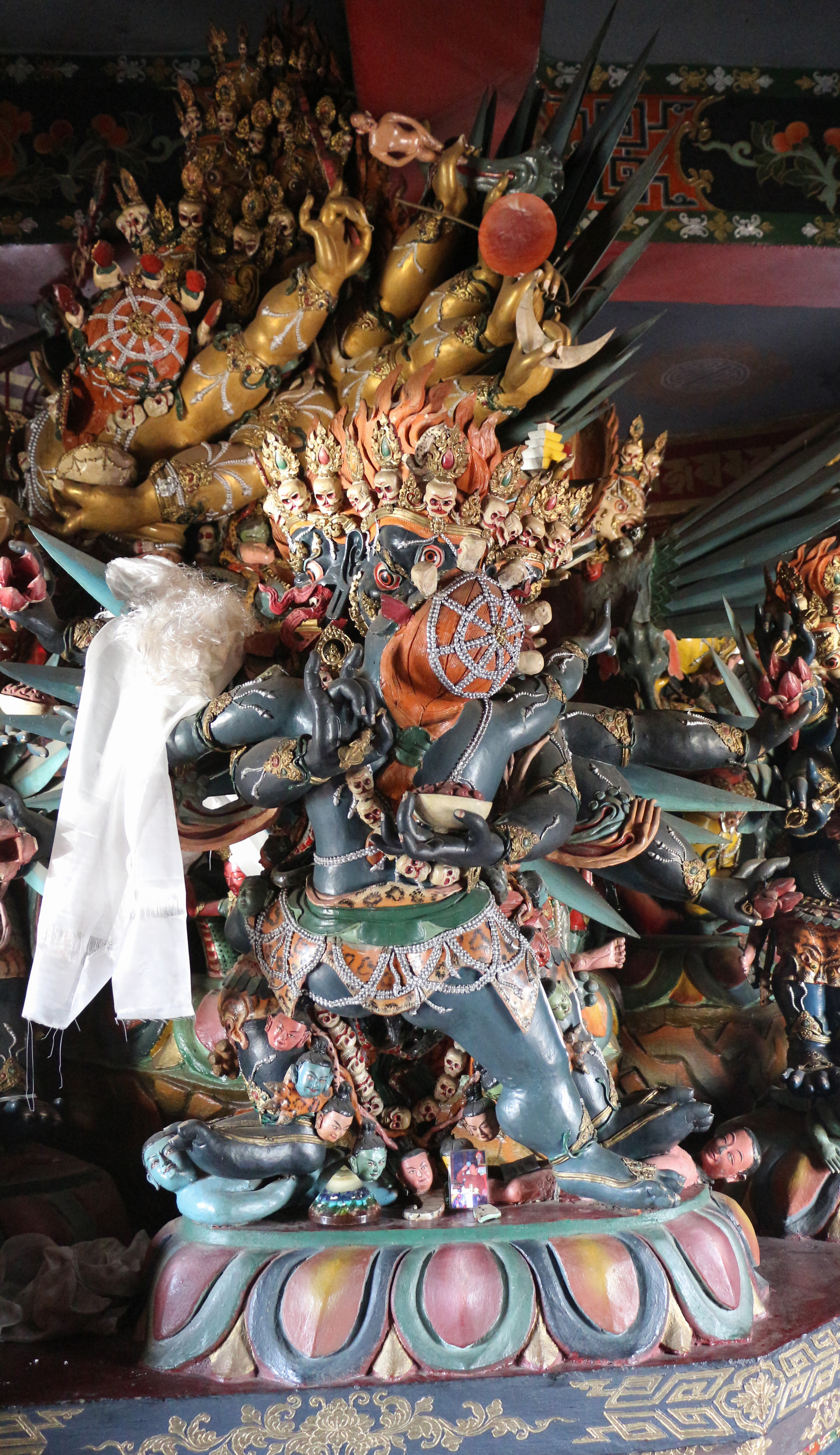
Sculpture inside the chorten

The chorten is decorated with richly carved annexes facing the four directions, and contain mandalas, statues and a shrine dedicated to the third king. The ground floor of the chorten is consecrated to the teachings of Vajrakīlaya. It has four shrines, each with different pictures of the king and with the eastern shrine housing a Buddha image. From the ground floor, a staircase leads to two more floors, and each floor has four shrines. A centrally placed large wooden carving covers all three levels behind the shrines; the many wooden carvings mostly depict wrathful-looking protective deities. The roof of chorten is accessed from the second level, and a protective railing covers the terrace on the third floor. The second floor is dedicated to teachings of the Drukpa lineage of the Kagyu school on subduing eight varieties of evil spirits, and the top floor is dedicated to the teachings of Lama Gongdü (Wylie: bla ma dgongs 'dus). Combined, these three floors represent the esoteric teachings of the Nyingmapa sect. All of the texts were once hidden by Padmasambhava and were rediscovered by tertöns in the 19th, 12th and 14th centuries respectively. The top floor has paintings depicting various deities of the Nyingma school, and visions which appear in the bardo. Above the top floor there is a gallery, which can be walked around the circumference of the chorten and which has views of the city.

== Religious practice and festival ==
The chorten attracts many elderly Bhutanese on a daily basis who circumambulate the chorten, whirl the large red prayer wheels and pray at the shrine. Held in great religious fervour, the chorten is circumambulated only in a clockwise direction, as is the rule for religious structures in Bhutan. The Monlam Prayer Festival is held here; on this occasion, the Je Khenpo (the religious head of Bhutan) addresses and blesses those who have congregated.
