= Dzongsar Khyentse Chökyi Lodrö =

Tibetan lama (c. 1893 – 1959)

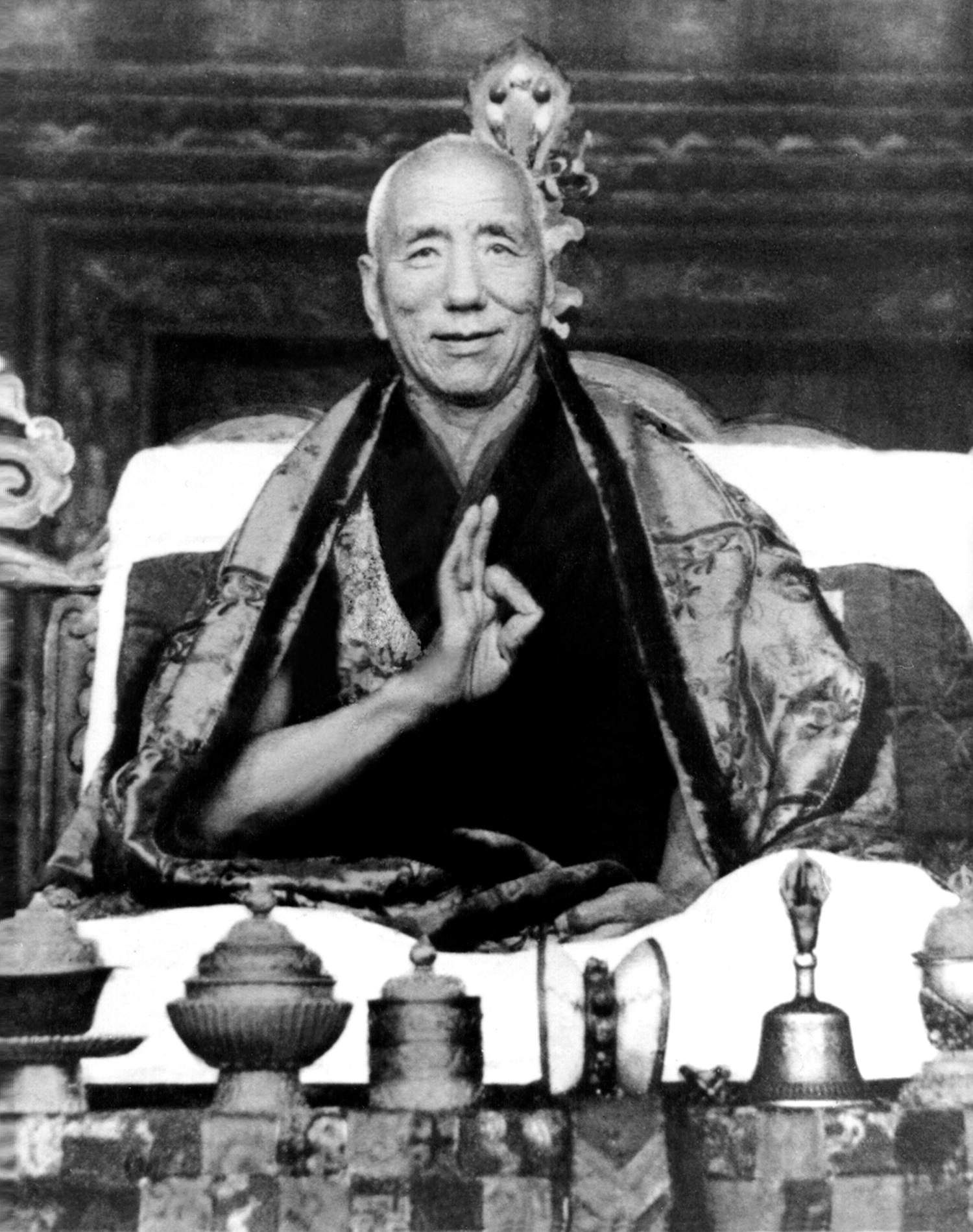
- Dzongsar Khyentse Chokyi Lodro

Tibetan name
- Tibetan: རྫོང་གསར་མཁྱེན་བརྩེ་ཆོས་ཀྱི་བློ་གྲོས་
Transcriptions
- Wylie: rdzong gsar mkhyen brtse chos kyi blo gros

Dzongsar Khyentse Chökyi Lodrö (c. 1893 – 1959) was a Tibetan lama, a master of many lineages, and a teacher of many of the major figures in 20th-century Tibetan Buddhism. Though he died in 1959 in Sikkim, and is not so well known in the West; he was a major proponent of the Rimé movement within Tibetan Buddhism, and had a profound influence on many of the Tibetan lamas teaching today.

== Biography ==
=== Early life and training ===
He was born in 1893 at Sa-ngen or Rekhe Ajam in Gonjo, near Katok Monastery in Kham south of DeGe. His father was Gyurme Tsewang Gyatso of Amdo and was considered to be a tantric master. His mother was Tsultrim Tso, granddaughter of Wangchen Tenzin, King of Lingtsang.

In 1900, at age seven, he was brought to Kathok Monastery and Kathok Situ Chökyi Gyatso recognized him ceremonially as the action emanation of Jamyang Khyentse Wangpo, the great Rimé master of 19th-century Tibet. In the following years of his youth he was tutored by Khenpo Thupten in grammar, astrology, Sanskrit and Buddhist texts. By the time he was thirteen he had received the transmission of the Longchen Nyingthig- the Heart Essence of the Vast Expanse, the Nyingthig Yabzhi - Four Branches of Heart Essence, and the pointing-out instruction to Dzogchen.

When he was fifteen he moved to Dzongsar Monastery, the seat of the previous Khyentse Wangpo. He studied abhidharma and Madhyamaka philosophy and soon began teaching Buddhist canonical texts to several students there. From the time he was seventeen, he received Sakya school transmissions such as lamdre lopshe and the Hevajra tantra, and many Nyingma terma teachings.

In 1919, when he was twenty-six, he went to Dzogchen Monastery and received ordination as a monk. Later in the same year he established a shedra at Dzongsar Monastery. At Shechen Monastery, he received a number of transmissions from Shechen Gyaltsap, who became one of his principal masters. The next few years of his life he visited many monasteries of the four main schools of Tibetan Buddhism, and received transmissions and lineage teachings from various teachers.

Then in 1926 he went on a pilgrimage to Ü-Tsang, and at Mindrolling Monastery, the main Nyingma monastery, took ordination as a monk for a second time. Just before he returned to his home region in Eastern Tibet, Kathok Situ Chokyi Gyatso of Kathok Monastery died. After this, for the next fifteen years Chökyi Lodrö took part in the administration of Kathok Monastery, which is home of the Kathok lineage teachings of the Nyingma. He continued to perfect, and accomplish the meditations and the sadhanas of all the Tibetan traditions, becoming a true Rime master, who was able to teach both analytical philosophy and the performance of practices leading to realization from the various lineages. During this time-period he also completed a five hundred thousand accumulation of his ngöndro.

In the 1940s he studied with the leading Vajrayana masters from all over Tibet, and continued receiving transmissions from the Gelug, Nyingma, Sakya and Kagyu schools. He developed a reputation during that era as being a Rimé master par excellence and many of the new generation of Lamas who would bring Tibetan Buddhism to the West began to see him as their master. Thus he became a teacher and guide for Dilgo Khyentse, Jigdral Yeshe Dorje (2nd Dudjom Rinpoche) and Sogyal Rinpoche. He was a major influence on a very young Chagdud Tulku Rinpoche, who first met him in 1945, and he is also mentioned with awe by Tulku Urgyen Rinpoche in his biography.

=== Later life and death ===
He became seriously ill in 1949, when he was fifty-six years old. According to his prophecies and those of Khyentse Wangpo, Jamgon Kongtrul, in order to remove obstacles to his longevity, and so he could continue to teach Dharma, it was necessary for him to drop his monastic vows and marry. For a Nyingma lama, this was not an unusual circumstance. He married Khandro Tsering Chödrön (b. 1929 d. 2011) that same year, and rapidly recovered his health.

In 1955 as the situation for monasteries continued to worsen in Eastern Tibet, he traveled to Lhasa. While there, he was invited to Tsurphu Monastery to give teachings and empowerments to Rangjung Rigpe Dorje, 16th Karmapa. In turn, the Karmapa gave him an empowerment in the red form of Avalokiteśvara, a historic, personal iṣṭadevatā of the Karmapas.

He then commenced a pilgrimage to India. He visited sites sacred to Buddhism in Nepal and India, and then at the invitation of the King of Sikkim, took up residence in Gangtok, Sikkim. In the final four years of his life, the Tsuklakhang Palace where he resided became a spiritual center. By this time he was known as a Master of masters, and his presence attracted many lamas from Tibet, who came to receive transmissions from him. According to Tulku Urgyen Rinpoche one could ask him for clarification about some point, in any of the termas from any of the numerous lineages, and he always had an answer.

During this time he met Sangharakshita, who was then a monk living in Kalimpong. He bestowed on him four sadhanas - Avalokitesvara, Manjusri, Vajrapani, and Green Tāra. He also commissioned a Manjusri thangka for him.

At the age of sixty-seven, in early 1959 with the Chinese Communist invasion of Tibet underway, he again became seriously ill. Prayers and rituals for his long life were performed day and night, by all the lineages in Sikkim. Despite these devoted spiritual efforts, he died. According to Sogyal Rinpoche he died in the "sleeping lion's posture", a yogic posture, and remained in a subtle meditative state for three days. His body was kept in state for six months, as disciples throughout the Himalayas came to pay their respects. According to legend, his body did not display the usual signs of decomposition during this time. This phenomenon has been known to occur at the death of several other tulkus. His cremation was performed at a stupa at Tashiding Monastery, Sikkim, and his remains are kept in the Royal Chapel of Sikkim.

In 1961 Dzongsar Jamyang Khyentse Rinpoche was born in Bhutan, and was immediately recognized as the incarnation of Dzongsar Khyentse Chökyi Lodrö.
