= Kathok Monastery =

Tibetan Buddhist monastery in Kham (Baiyü County, Sichuan, China)

Kathok
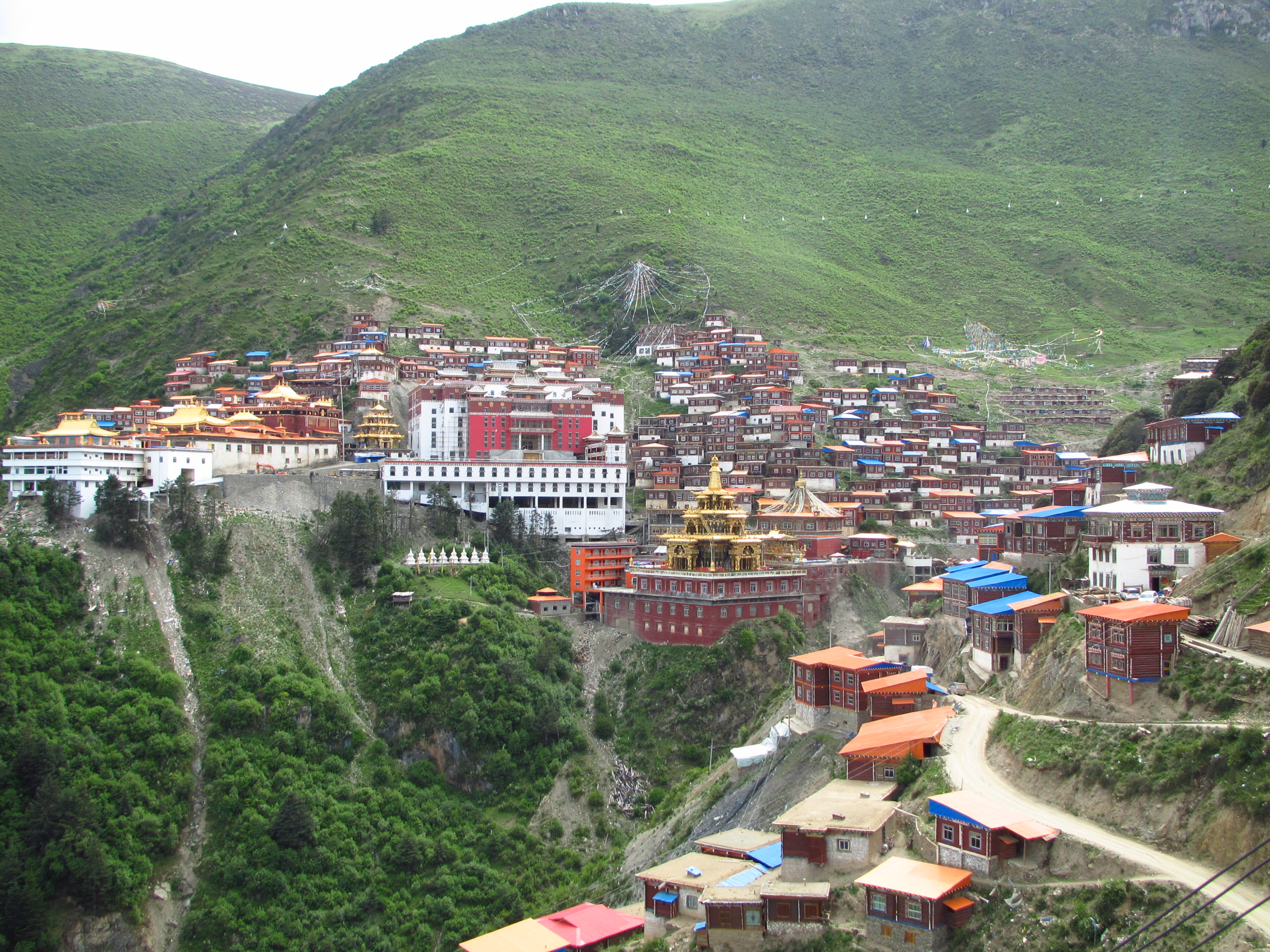
- Kathok Monastery in 2014

- Location Kathok Monastery (Sichuan)

Religion
- Affiliation: Tibetan Buddhism
- Sect: Nyingma
- Deity: Padmasambhava

Location
- Location: Baiyu County, Garzê Tibetan Autonomous Prefecture, Sichuan, traditionally known as Do Kham
- Country: Tibet
- Coordinates: 31.3126°N 98.9414°E

Architecture
- Founder: Kathok Dampa Deshek
- Established: 1159; 867 years ago

Kathok Monastery (Tibetan: ཀཿཐོག་དགོན།, THL Kathok Gön), also transliterated as Kathog, Katok, or Katog, was founded in 1159 and is one of the "Six Mother Monasteries" in Tibet of the Nyingma school of Tibetan Buddhism. It was built after Samye Monastery, in the Kingdom of Dege (Ch. Baiyu County, Garzê Tibetan Autonomous Prefecture, Sichuan), in Tibet's region of Kham also known of as Do Kham.

== Description ==
Kathok Monastery is located 4,000 m (13,000 ft) above sea level on the eastern flanks of a mountain range in Baiyu County, Garzê, Sichuan. The entire monastery complex is approximately 700 m (2,300 ft) above the valley floor and is accessed by a dirt road containing 18 hairpin turns. The nearest town is Horpo (Chinese: 河坡; pinyin: Hépō), 17 km to the north.

== History ==
Kathok is a famous early Nyingma monastery which grew to include numerous branch monasteries within the Do Kham region and beyond. It is also credited as influencing the spread of the Nyingma monasteries known of as the "Six Mother Monasteries".

Padmasambhava, or Guru Rinpoche, spent 25 days visiting the site before the monastery was built, and sat on a rock with a double vajra, called Dorje Gatramo, with a ཀཿ (ka, with visarga, or རྣམ་བཅད Wy.: rnam bcad) syllable on top. The monastery was built on this rock, giving it its name, which means "on top of the kaཿ ", and it is considered one of Guru Rinpoche's 25 sacred sites in Do Kham.

Kathok Monastery was founded in 1159 by a younger brother of Phagmo Drupa Dorje Gyalpo, Kathok Kadampa Deshek, prophesied by Guru Rinpoche to be an emanation of Yeshe Tsogyal. He built Kathok at Derge, the historic seat of the Kingdom of Derge in Kham. The prophecy that 100,000 people would achieve rainbow body at Kathok is said to have been realized.

Kathok Monastery's third abbot, Jampa Bum (1179–1252), whose 26-year tenure as abbot ended in 1252, "is said to have ordained thousands of monks from across Tibet, and especially from the Kham areas of Minyak (Wy.: mi nyag), Jang (Wy.: 'byang), and Gyémorong (Wy.: rgyal mo rong)."

The original gompa fell into disrepair and was rebuilt on the same site in 1656 through the impetus of tertöns Düddül Dorjé (1615–72) and Rigdzin Longsal Nyingpo (1625-1682/92 or 1685–1752). After 1966, the monastery was destroyed by the Chinese while lamas were imprisoned. The monastery was rebuilt through the efforts of Moktsa Tulku after he was released from prison, and of Khenpo Ngakchung Tulku.

Kathok Monastery held a reputation of fine scholarship. Prior to the annexation of Tibet in 1951, Kathok Monastery housed about 800 monks.

Kathok was long renowned as a center specializing in the Nyingma school Kama lineages (oral lineages), as opposed to the Terma lineages, and as a center of monasticism, although both of these features evolved under Longsel Nyingpo (1625–1692).

According to The Tibetan Buddhist Resource Centre, disciples of Kenpo Munsel and Kenpo Jamyang compiled a Kathok edition of the oral lineages (Wylie: bka' ma shin tu rgyas pa (kaH thog)) in 120 volumes in 1999: "[T]wice the size of the Dudjom edition, it contains many rare Nyingma treatises on Mahayoga, Anuyoga, and Atiyoga that heretofore had never been seen outside of Tibet."

According to Alexander Berzin,

Katog has 112 branch monasteries, not only in Tibet, but also in Mongolia, Inner China, Yunnan, and Sikkim. For instance, Katog Rigdzin-tsewang-norbu (Ka:-thog Rigs-'dzin Tshe-dbang nor-bu) (1698-1755) founded a large branch in Sikkim, and when the Eighth Tai Situ Rinpoche, Situ Panchen Chokyi-jungney (Si-tu Pan-chen Chos-kyi 'byung-gnas) (1700-1744), visited China, he stayed at the Katog branch-monastery at the Five-Peaked Mountain of Manjushri (Ri-bo rtse-lnga, Chin: Wutai Shan), to the southwest of Beijing.

=== Anuyoga ===
Kathok Monastery became a bastion of the Anuyoga tradition when it became neglected by other Nyingmapa institutions. The Compendium of the Intentions Sūtra (Wylie: dgongs pa 'dus pa'i mdo) the root text of the Anuyoga tradition was instrumental in the early Kathog educational system. Nubchen Sangye Yeshe wrote a lengthy commentary on the Compendium of the Intentions Sūtra rendered in English as Armor Against Darkness (Wylie: mun pa'i go cha).

=== Expansion ===
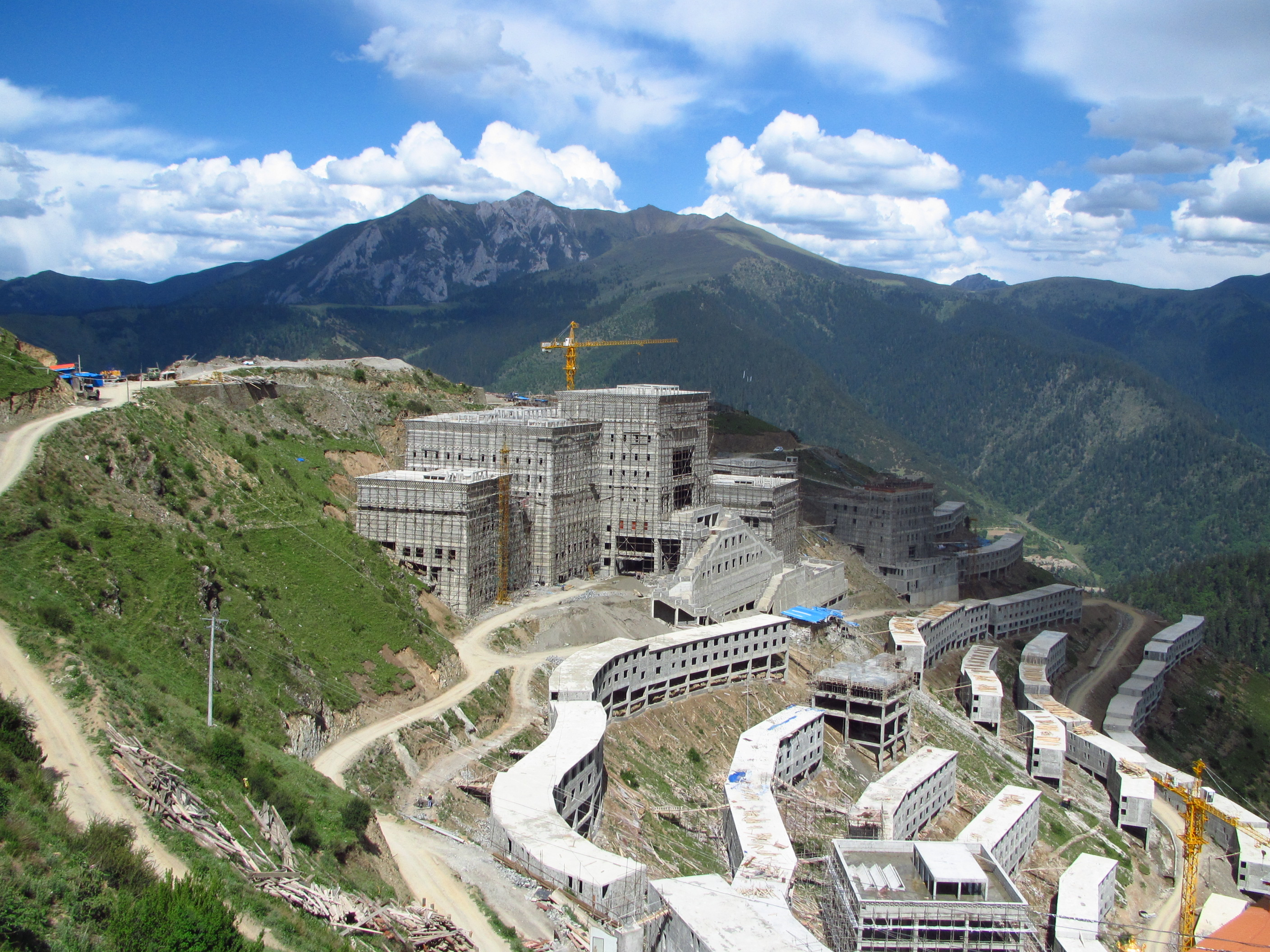
Kathok Monastery's new complex under construction in 2014

In 2016, an expansion of the Kathok Monastery to the northeast was completed. This expansion included a new temple and assembly hall, directly adjacent to the existing monastery complex.

== People from Kathok Monastery ==
- A minor figure from Kathok, the 1st Chonyi Gyatso, Chopa Lugu (17th century - mid-18th century), is remembered for his "nightly bellowing of bone-trumpet and shouting of phet" on pilgrimage, much to the irritation of the business traveler who accompanied him. Chopa Lugu became renowned as "The Chod Yogi Who Split a Cliff in China (rgya nag brag bcad gcod pa)."
- Dzongsar Khyentse Chökyi Lodrö (c.1893 – 1959) was educated at Kathok.
- The 5th Nyingon Choktrul, Gyurme Kelzang Tobgyel Dorje (1937–1979) was a noted teacher in the Kathok tradition.
- Jamyang Gyeltsen (1929–1999) served as a principal abbot, and was involved in rebuilding the monastery in the 1980s. He is known for his teaching, writing, and for compiling a history of the monastery.
- The 4th Kathok Getse Rinpoche Gyurme Tenpa Gyaltsen (1954–2018), holder of the Kathok Monastery lineage, was known for his mastery of Dzogchen. He was head of the Nga-gyur Kathok Azom Woesel Do-ngag Choekorling, and 7th head of the Nyingma school, from January–November 2018.

=== Lauded scholars seated at Kathok Monastery ===
- Katok Tsewang Norbu (1698–1755)
- Getse Mahapandita (1761–1829)
- Katok Situ Chökyi Gyatso (1880-1923/5)
- Khenpo Ngawang Pelzang (also known as Khenpo Ngakchung)
- Katok Situ Chökyi Nyima (1928–1962, died of starvation in Gothang Gyalgo prison camp)

== See also ==
- List of Tibetan monasteries
