= Dudjom Lingpa =

Tibetan Lama and tertön

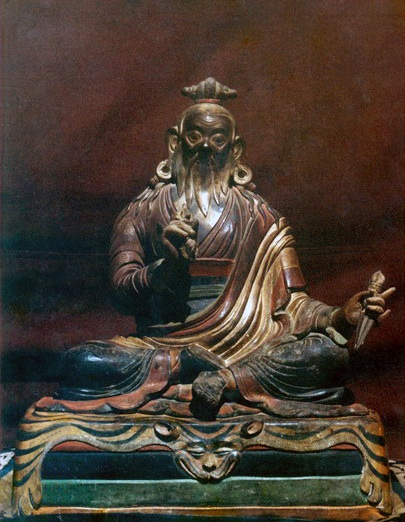
Dudjom Lingpa

Dudjom Lingpa (Tibetan: བདུད་འཇོམས་གླིང་པ, Wylie: bdud 'joms gling pa; 1835–December 27, 1903) was a Tibetan Nyingma school meditation master, spiritual teacher and tertön. He was a recognized reincarnation of Rigdzen Düddul Dorje, and therefore of Khye'u Chung Lotsawa who was among the twenty-five heart students of Guru Padmasambhava. Raised in Amdo, Tibet, he had no formal education, nor did he take ordination as a monk or belong to an established Buddhist monastery. Instead, he received direct teachings through visionary experiences with the Nyingma school masters Padmasambhava and Yeshe Tsogyal, and with other Buddhas and realized beings. His subsequent reincarnation is the highly revered Kyabje Dudjom Rinpoche.

Dudjom Lingpa was met with great skepticism by many of his contemporaries, and he stands out from his era's norm for Tibetan Buddhist teachers. The skepticism was because, despite not studying under any established Buddhist teachers of his time, he claimed to receive teachings on meditation and spiritual practice directly from non-physical masters like Guru Rinpoche and Yeshe Tsogyal, as well as Bodhisattvas such as Avalokitesvara and Manjushri. It was not until his disciples started showing clear signs of spiritual maturity, that he was accepted by his contemporaries as an authentic teacher and tertön.

Today, his teachings of the Dudjom Tersar and his literary works, especially those on non-meditation Dzogchen, are highly regarded within the Nyingma school tradition of Tibetan Buddhism. His deeply popular cycle of Chöd practices on the black wrathful female deity Tröma Nagmo, a form of Vajravarahi, resulted from a series of visions of and transmissions from Machik Labdron and Padampa Sangye.

== Dudjom Tersar ==
Dudjom Tersar is the collective name for the large collection of terma teachings revealed by Dudjom Lingpa and Dudjom Rinpoche. As a class of texts, Tersar (Wylie: gter gsar) means "new or recently-revealed treasure teachings". Dudjom Rinpoche was a major tertön (Wylie: gter ston) or revealer of hidden teachings.

== Nang Jang ==
Nang Jang (refinement of perception) is the name given to a visionary text of the Tibetan Dzogchen tradition, in which the Dzogchen master, Dudjom Lingpa, experiences visionary visitation from fourteen awakened beings, including Avalokiteshvara and Longchenpa, who teach him of the illusory nature of all things and how they arise from the basis or primordial state.

According to the teachings bestowed upon Dudjom Lingpa by the highly advanced spiritual beings who visit him in this text, all phenomenal, sensible things are empty and illusory. Yet there is that which is not separate from them, nor they from it, and which can be described as the 'ground of being'. Orgyan Tsokyey Dorje (one of the spiritual visitants) states:

All sensory appearances are not other than the ground of being, but are of one taste with that ground itself, like the reflections of all the planets and stars in the ocean that are not other than the ocean, but are of one taste with the water itself.

The text also tells of how the Buddha nature, the heart of awareness, is utterly pure and lucid and constitutes the very life essence of all things, both samsaric and nirvanic. Ekajati declares:

Since the fundamental nature of awareness, buddha nature, is pristine and lucid, free of sullying factors, it is "utter lucidity". Since it is endowed with the seven indestructible vajra [diamond / adamantine] attributes, it is "vajra". And since it abides as the vital essence of all phenomena of samsara and nirvana, it is "heart essence".

This is ultimate reality, a state of truth beyond ordinary mundane consciousness and beyond the power of words to describe. It is designated by Zurchhung Sheyrab Dragpa in the text as "a supreme and inexpressible state", the "fundamental nature beyond ordinary consciousness." The practitioner of this spiritual path is urged to strive for obtaining of an ultimate all-knowingness which transcends time:

Hold this to be the most excellent key point - to practice with intense and unflagging exertion until you attain supreme timeless awareness [jnana], which is total omniscience.
