= Kunzang Palyul Choling =

Buddhist center in Maryland

Coordinates: 39.08135°N 77.38284°W

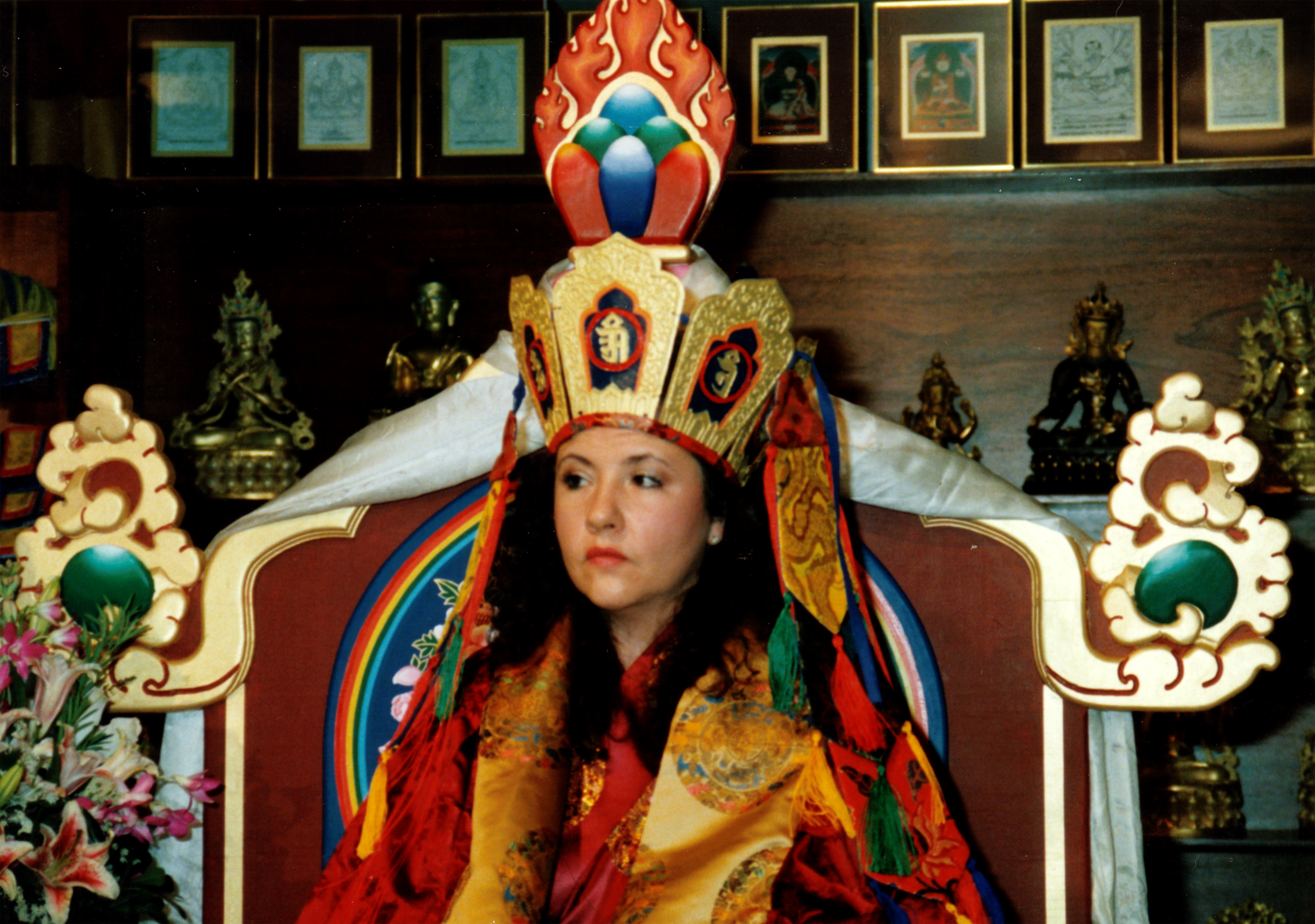
Jetsunma Ahkon Lhamo: first Western woman to be recognized as an incarnate lama

Kunzang Palyul Choling (KPC) is an organization for Buddhist study and practice in the Nyingma tradition (Palyul lineage) that is located in Poolesville, Maryland and Sedona, Arizona, with smaller groups in Santa Barbara, California and across Australia. KPC was founded by Jetsunma Ahkon Lhamo and later given to Penor Rinpoche. KPC was Penor Rinpoche's first Dharma Center in the US.

== Teachers ==
Jetsunma Ahkon Lhamo Rinpoche is the KPC resident lama. She was enthroned as a lineage holder in 1988 by Penor Rinpoche. Khenpo Pem Tsheri Sherpa from Namdroling monastery is a returning teacher, in residence several months out of the year. The monks and nuns and Ahkon Lhamo's daughter Atira teach beginning classes.

== Prayer vigil ==
KPC was established in 1985 to house the 24-hour prayer vigil begun in Jetsunma Ahkon Lhamo's basement, and to create a temple that was open 24 hours a day. Participants maintain two-hour prayer shifts, doing practices in the Nyingma tradition. The vigil is dedicated to the end of suffering and has remained unbroken. In 1999, Kunzang Palyul Choling (KPC) began another 24-hour prayer vigil in the new location in Sedona, Arizona.

== Founding ==
In 1988, Penor Rinpoche enthroned Jetsunma Ahkon Lhamo during the Rinchen Terzod cycle of esoteric empowerments at Kunzang Palyul Choling. At that time he ordained 25 monks and nuns, creating a large ordained community. In 1990, the temple purchased 65 acres of land and built prayer wheels and statues which Yangthang Rinpoche consecrated following the Nyingtig Yabshi empowerments. Ahkon Lhamo later moved to Sedona, Arizona, and the temple expanded there. She returned to Maryland in the early 2000's.

Historically, the temple has hosted Buddhist teachers of the Nyingma lineage. Gyaltrul Rinpoche gave Nam Cho, generation stage, and tsa lung teachings. Jigme Phuntsok gave his own discovered teachings (terma), Kusum Lingpa gave the Yeshe Lama trekchod and togyal teachings, and Chagdud Tulku Rinpoche gave his Red Tara teachings. Dzigar Kongtrul Rinpoche was briefly in residence, and Khenpo Palden Sherab and Khenpo Tsewang Dongyal returned frequently to teach.

== Locations ==
=== Poolesville, Maryland ===
Kunzang Palyul Choling's main temple is located in suburban Maryland surrounded by the McKee-Beshers Wildlife Management Area. The main shrine is an antebellum-style mansion renovated into a Tibetan Buddhist style temple situated on 17 acres to one side of River Road, with 65 acres of walking trails in the Peace Park. There are over twenty stupas, many Tibetan prayer wheels, gardens, and Buddha statues throughout the property. The largest stupas are the 36' Enlightenment and the 38' Mingyur Dorje stupas, the latter of which houses a relic from Tulku Mingyur Dorje and is located in the middle of the Peace Park. In 2022, a large statue of Guru Rinpoche was consecrated at the main entrance of the Peace Park.

The main temple structure has been closed due to the COVID-19 pandemic, and the residence area has been closed to public activities awaiting renovations to comply with Montgomery County's Building Use and Occupancy Code. The prayer room, which is separate from the main building, remains open and houses all teachings and activities. The organization raised $1 million for the building of the new temple. The first wastewater phase of the renovations was completed spring 2023.

=== Sedona, Arizona ===
KPC's Sedona, Arizona location has a community of Jetsunma Ahkon Lhamo's students who built the 36' Amitabha Stupa, which has become a tourist destination at the base of Thunder Mountain. The Sedona center is home to Dakini Valley, a large tract of undeveloped land.

=== Australia ===
KPC's Australian students are spread widely over the Northern Territory, Queensland, South Australia and Victoria. They sponsor visits from teachers from Namdroling monastery in India, such as Khenpo Pem.

== Teachings and practices ==
Jetsunma Ahkon Lhamo teaches twice a week, Sundays and Wednesdays, and podcasts Buddhism for Beginners. Atira Zeoli, Ahkon Lhamo's daughter, teaches a beginning class twice monthly, while the monks and nuns teach shamatha meditation on weekends based on Jetsunma Ahkon Lhamo's book Stabilizing the Mind.

The Mingyur Dorje Institute started by Khenchen Tsewang Gyatso has been continued by Khenpo Pem Tsheri Sherpa, who teaches a regular series of classes on such topics as Shantideva's Bodhisattva's Guide (Bodhicharyavatara).

Visiting teachers give esoteric empowerments. Kuchen Rinpoche and Khenpo Norgay give empowerments necessary for students to begin many traditional Vajrayana Buddhist practices. In addition, students attend the annual Palyul summer retreat in McDonough, NY.

== Monastic community ==
Kunzang Palyul Choling has a large community of monks and nuns, many of whom have remained ordained since 1988. A small number live at the temple while the majority live in households of three and four nearby.

== Charity work ==
In response to growing food insecurity during the pandemic, in 2020 the temple received a grant from Montgomery County and dedicated 2,400 feet of lawn to a teaching garden. Since May 2021, it has produced hundreds of pounds of food that have been donated to help shelters and the food insecure throughout the region.

Caring for animals is a large part of the temple activities. The Garuda Aviary was founded in 1998 to help abused, neglected, or abandoned parrots. Its focus is on desperate cases where birds have become "unadoptable" due to past mistreatment or abuse, and birds taken into the sanctuary have a life-long home. The Aviary aims to educate the public on the exotic bird trade that takes parrots from their natural habitat. It is open to visitors in good weather, where people can view the birds and hear their caretaker give a presentation on the challenges faced by exotic birds. To save the many pets left behind after Hurricane Katrina, in 2006, the temple ran Tara's Babies to rescue them, and continued to take in fearful and unadoptable animals from shelters, housing them on property near the Sedona, Arizona location.

Licensed through the State of Maryland Department of Environmental Protection, since 1988 the temple has had Maryland's first and only constructed wetlands, treating its own wastewater and relieving pressure on municipal infrastructure. The wetlands are the brainchild of temple member David Bailey. They are made up of planted sand and gravel ponds, which naturally filter wastewater, which is further treated with aerators, filters, and ultraviolet light. In 2023 they were upgraded with a new, state-of-the-art underground nitrogen-removing tank.

Monks and nuns from the temple, answering letters from prisoners who were interested in Buddhism, joined the ministerial program at various prisons in Maryland. Monks and nuns are trained by the prison system on their rules and restrictions, and visit to teach meditation.

== Recording and publication ==
Palyul Productions records video, audio, and transcripts of teachings given at Kunzang Palyul Choling in order to preserve and disseminate them.

Blinded by View, which was originally known as Skydancer, produces Ahkon Lhamo's music. Invocation at Discogs
