= Jetsunma Ahkon Lhamo =

American Tibetan Buddhist tulku

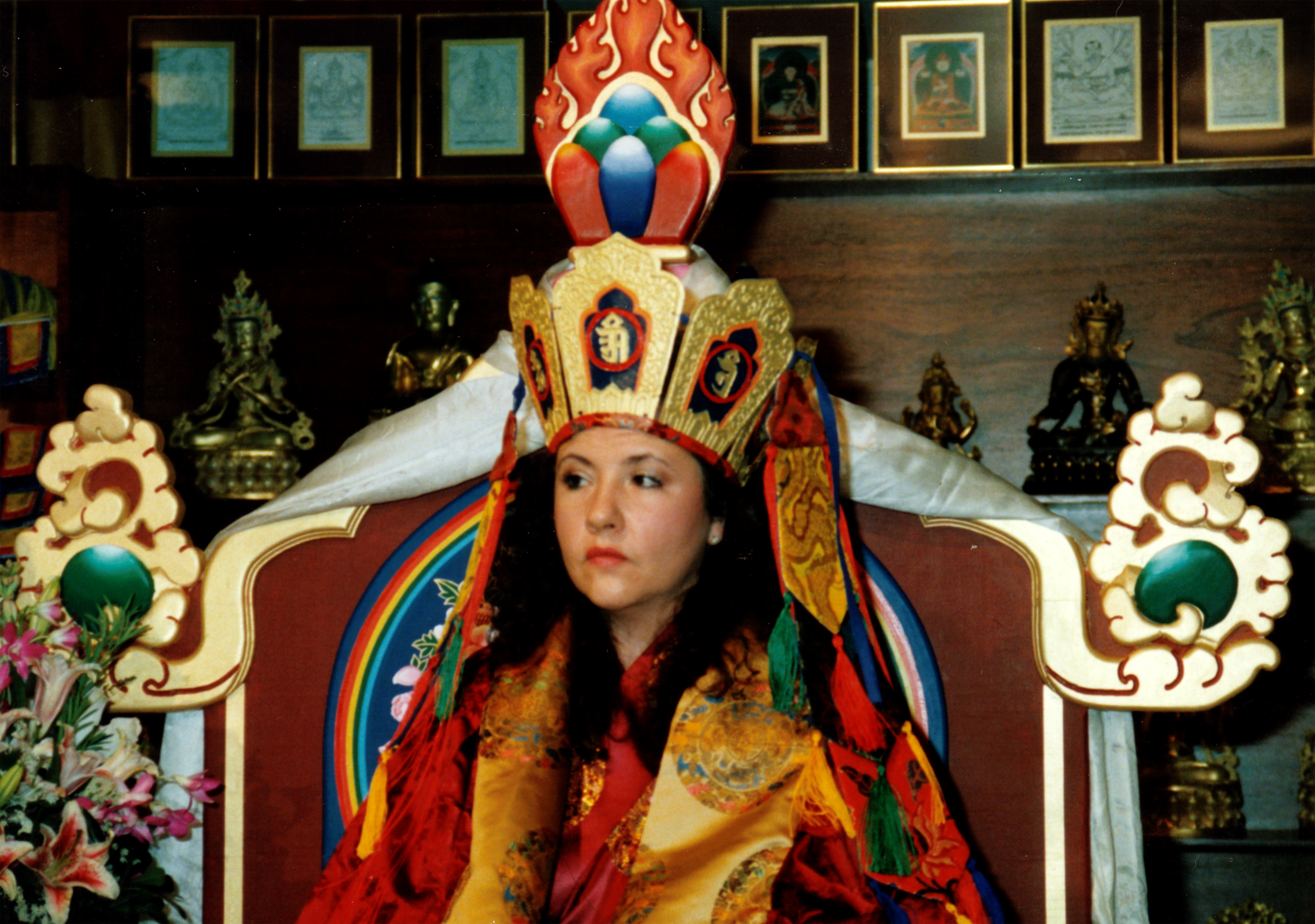
- 1988 Enthronement With Dakini Crown

Personal life
- Born: Alyce Louise Zeoli; October 12, 1949 (age 77) Brooklyn, New York
- Other name: Catharine Burroughs
- Occupation: Lama
- Website: http://tara.org

Religious life
- Religion: Tibetan Buddhism
- School: Vajrayana Nyingma
- Lineage: Palyul
- Dharma name: Ahkon Norbu Lhamo

Senior posting
- Teacher: HH Drubwang Pedma Norbu Rinpoche
- Based in: Poolesville, Maryland
- Reincarnation: Genyenma Ahkon Lhamo

Jetsunma Ahkon Lhamo (born October 12, 1949; born Alyce Louise Zeoli) is a tulku within the Palyul lineage of the Nyingma tradition of Tibetan Buddhism. She gained international attention when she, a Western woman, was enthroned as a reincarnated lama. Since the mid-1980's she has served as spiritual director for Kunzang Odsal Palyul Changchub Choling, a Buddhist center in Poolesville, Maryland, which includes a large community of western monks and nuns. She also founded a center in Sedona, Arizona, U.S.A., and has small communities of students in California and Australia. Ahkon Lhamo has been described by her teachers, Tibetan lamas Penor Rinpoche, Gyatrul Rinpoche, as well as others such as Jigme Phuntsok, as a dakini or female wisdom being.

== Biography ==
=== Early years ===
Zeoli was born in Canarsie, Brooklyn on October 12, 1949, to an Austrian/Dutch Jewish mother and Italian father. She and her half-brothers and sisters were raised by her stepfather and mother, and alternately attended the Dutch Reform Church and the Catholic church. The family moved to Hialeah, Florida when she was 14. Her stepfather was an alcoholic and physically abusive towards the children, and Zeoli tried to run away at age 17. After high school, she married Jim Perry and gave birth to her first son, Ben. The marriage ended in divorce and she moved to a farm outside Asheville, North Carolina with Pat Mulloy. They married and she had another son, Christopher. Zeoli adopted her daughter, Atira, later in 1988.

=== Early years ===
Based on a series of instructive dreams that started at age 19, Zeoli began a meditation practice, later identified as chod by Penor Rinpoche, culminating in a spiritual experience at age 30. She studied with a New Age teacher named Jim Gore and led classes at the Black Mountain Light Center in North Carolina. In 1980, she met Michael Burroughs, a graduate student in religions at the University of Virginia and separated from Malloy in 1981.

Zeoli moved with Burroughs and her son Christopher to Kensington, Maryland. (Her son Ben remained with Malloy.) She married Burroughs in 1983 and changed her name to Catharine. Together they formed a non-sectarian organization The Center for Discovery and New Life beginning with former members from the Black Mountain Light Center. She gave channeled teachings, specifically a three-year cycle of teachings called the Santu Series Her group quickly expanded, with the students practicing the meditation techniques Zeoli herself practiced from her dreams, and taking vows of compassion that Zeoli composed. The group began a 24-hour prayer vigil in the basement of their Kensington home in April, 1985.

== Buddhism ==
=== Meeting her root guru ===
In 1984, Zeoli's students met a Tibetan man named Kunzang, Penor Rinpoche's main lay attendant, who was selling rugs to support Namdroling Monastery. The students sponsored seventy Namdroling monks. A few months later, on his first visit to the US Penor Rinpoche visited her center and stayed with the Burroughs. During that week, he interviewed Ahkon Lhamo's students, as well as Ahkon Lhamo herself, about what was being taught and what they were practicing. The students asked him what their missions were to help the world. He announced that Zeoli had been teaching Mahayana Buddhism without any formal instruction and attributed it to practice accomplished in previous lifetimes. Penor Rinpoche then gave Ahkon Lhamo's students the traditional refuge and bodhisattva vows, which constitute formal entry into Hinayana and Mahayana Buddhism, respectively.

Thereafter Zeoli continued the channeled teachings, but they took on a more Buddhist flavor. The center hosted Khenpo Palden Sherab and Khenpo Tsewang Dongyal, Gyaltrul Rinpoche, and Chagdud Tulku as she and her students began traditional Buddhist preliminary practice, ngöndro. Beset by health problems, she made a trip in 1986 to Ashland, Oregon to visit Gyatrul Rinpoche, one of Penor Rinpoche's other hosts on his American tour the previous year. She formed a strong and immediate connection with Gyatrul Rinpoche, the incarnation of Palyul Monastery's founder, Rigdzin Kunzang Sherab (1636-1699). Gyatrul Rinpoche echoed the sentiment that the practices and teachings that Zeoli was giving were Buddhist and due to past lifetimes of practice, and encouraged her to visit Penor Rinpoche in India to investigate the matter further.

=== Transmissions ===
At the age of 37, Ahkon Lhamo began the sequence of Buddhist practices that most tulkus begin very young. She was given the Nam Cho Ngöndro by Gyaltrul Rinpoche in 1986, accumulating prostrations alongside her students. A year later, she was given the Three Roots from Penor Rinpoche at Namdroling monastery in India.

She received the Rinchen Terzod from Penor Rinpoche, Nam Cho Tsa Lung from Gyaltrul Rinpoche, Nyingthik Yabshi and Ratna Lingpa from Yangthang Rinpoche, Jigmed Phuntsok's Gurkukma Vajrakilaya and other terma, the Yeshe Lama from Orgyen Kusum Lingpa, and the Nam Cho cycle of empowerments from Penor Rinpoche, which were hosted at Kunzang Palyul Choling from 1988 through 1996. She traveled to receive the Kama transmission at Tashi Choling in Ashland, Oregon, in 1988, and the Nam Cho a second time from Karma Kuchen in McDonough, New York, in 2018.

=== Buddhist temple ===
In 1985, her center formed a corporation and purchased an antebellum-style mansion in Poolesville, Maryland where her temple was established, which Penor Rinpoche named Kunzang Palyul Choling. They also purchased numerous large crystals weighing hundreds of pounds and held a three-day retreat to instate the 24-hour prayer vigil at the new location.

==== 24-hour Prayer vigil ====
The 24-hour prayer vigil is the core of her teachings and the temple's activity. Participants maintain two-hour prayer shifts and the vigil is dedicated to the end of suffering. Ahkon Lhamo initiated the 24-hour Prayer Vigil for World Peace in her Kensington, Maryland home on April 18, 1985, beginning with practices she taught, and later continuing with traditional Buddhist practices in the Nyingma tradition. The vigil relocated later that year to the newly purchased World Prayer Center (now Kunzang Palyul Choling). In addition to the ongoing prayers for peace, members and individuals not associated with KPC request prayers be dedicated to loved ones, pets, the recently deceased, or those hit by natural disasters. Occasionally Ahkon Lhamo asks that the vigil be dedicated to specific situations. For example, the members dedicated eight months of prayer for Asia Claus, a three-year-old daughter of temple members who was suffering from her second bout of cancer. The effort concluded when doctors could find no trace of the cancer, sparking a round of media attention. The Maryland vigil continues unbroken to the present day.

==== Stupas ====
She had a 36' stupa built in 1988 which was consecrated by Penor Rinpoche during the Rinchen Terzod. Then eight small stupas representing the eight activities of the Buddha. encircling an 18' stupa were built in 1991 and consecrated by Khenchen Tsewang Gyatso. Penor Rinpoche gave Ahkon Lhamo a relic from Tulku Migyur Dorje to be housed in the Migyur Dorje Stupa, which was built and consecrated in 1996.

In 1996, in addition to the temple, prayer vigil, teachings and stupas, Ahkon Lhamo's vision for Kunzang Palyul Choling included a place for pilgrimage with a hospice, school for children, a monastery and an institute for higher education in the Buddha's teachings. The school, called Pema Choling, ran from 1992 to 1997.

==== Monastic community ====
Like her predecessor, Ahkon Lhamo took lay vows, even as she built a monastic community for those who wished to take full ordination. In September 1988, toward the end of Penor Rinpoche’s conferral of the Rinchen Terdzod, 25 of Ahkon Lhamo's students underwent the traditional ordination ceremony to become monks and nuns, creating a large monastic community. Though some have since left their ordination or died, others have joined, and by 2008 the number of KPC's ordained had grown to 40.

== Buddhist recognitions ==
The Third Drubwang Padma Norbu ("Penor") Rinpoche, 11th Throneholder of Palyul Monastery, former Supreme Head of the Nyingma tradition, officially recognized Ahkon Lhamo in 1987 as the tulku of Genyenma Ahkon Lhamo during her visit to his Namdroling Monastery in Bylakuppe, Karnataka, India.

The Buddha From Brooklyn asserts that the students determine what title they will use for their own teacher and that Zeoli's ex-husband, Michael Burroughs, selected the title 'Jetsunma' for her. This is a title rarely given to even the most revered Tibetan Buddhist women teachers.

=== Genyenma Ahkon Lhamo ===
The first Genyenma Ahkon Lhamo, a meditator recognized as a wisdom dakini was one of the main disciples of Namchö Mingyur Dorje (1645–67) and sister of Rigdzin Kunzang Sherab, Migyur Dorje's Dharma heir and the First Throneholder of Palyul Monastery (founded 1665).[8] She was credited as being instrumental to the founding of Palyul (now one of the Nyingma's six main or "mother" monasteries) and for leaving a relic that is important to Palyul. During the cremation of her body, her kapala (top half of the skull) is said to have flown three kilometers and come to rest at the foot of the teaching throne of her brother. Found to be miraculously embossed with the sacred syllable AH, the kapala became an important relic housed at Palyul monastery in Tibet.

Penor Rinpoche gave the relic to Ahkon Lhamo in 1988. He recounted that as a young tulku in Tibet (he was recognized and brought to Palyul Monastery in 1936, at the age of four), inspired by seeing the skull relic, he made prayers to find Ahkon Lhamo's incarnation. Though most of the kapala relic was pulverized into dust during the Cultural Revolution, one Tibetan man managed to save a silver dollar-size piece on which the syllable "AH" appears. Penor Rinpoche acquired it from him on a return trip to Tibet in 1987. He had it preserved in a crystal lotus bowl and presented it to Ahkon Lhamo just prior to the occasion of her enthronement ceremony at Kunzang Palyul Choling (KPC) in 1988. The relic remains at KPC and is displayed on auspicious days.

=== Mandarava emanation ===
In 1994, Terton Orgyen Kusum Lingpa indicated in a long-life prayer he composed that Ahkon Lhamo was an emanation of Lhacham Mandarava, the Indian princess of Zahor and one of the consorts of Padmasambhava, a tantric master who helped establish the Buddha's teaching in Tibet. In 1996, she traveled to India and visited many of the places where Mandarava was known to have practiced. Inspired by these events, several of Ahkon Lhamo's students sought out and found a copy of Mandarava's middle-length spiritual biography, revealed as a terma in the 17th century by Samten Lingpa, at the U.S. Library of Congress. They then sponsored an English translation of the text, published as The Lives and Liberation of Princess Mandarava in 1998.

== Expansion ==
=== Arizona, Australia, and Mongolia ===
In the late 90's Ahkon Lhamo moved to Arizona with a number of students to start a second center, where she resided for the next decade. There she built a 36' Amitabha stupa in a Peace Park, which is now a local attraction for Sedona, Arizona. In 1999, Kunzang Palyul Choling (KPC) began a second 24-hour prayer vigil which continued until August 31, 2008. During this period Ahkon Lhamo hosted various teachers and taught the Chime Sogtik teachings on long life. Students from across Australia hosted Palyul teachers and regularly visited her US centers.

Growing out of a personal friendship with then Mongolian Ambassador Choinkhor and his wife, Ahkon Lhamo asked her students in 2004 to create the Mongolian Buddhism Revival Project (MBRP) to help with Mongolia's post-Communist revival of its Buddhist culture, especially the Nyingma lineage. Permanent staff was sent to Mongolia's capital, Ulaanbaatar, in early 2005.

=== Classical Buddhist teachings ===
From 1996–2001, Ahkon Lhamo hosted the Migyur Dorje Institute of Higher Buddhist Studies (MDI). Under this program, taught by Khenchen Tsewang Gyatso, students received complete commentary teachings on classic Buddhist texts by Shantideva, Chandrakirti, Asanga, Ngari Panchen, and Mipham Rinpoche. This curriculum was supplemented by annual 30-day retreats teaching the traditional Nyingmapa sequence of the inner tantra: Ngondro, Tsa Lung, Trekchod, and Togyal. With Penor Rinpoche’s development of a similar program at the Palyul Retreat Center in McDonough, NY, the MDI program has been discontinued.

=== Music ===
Ahkon Lhamo had already begun composing music in the 1990's with her CD "Invocation," a prayer to Guru Rinpoche, the founder of Buddhism in Tibet. In Sedona, she experimented and combined mantra, Tibetan instruments, and popular musical styles on her albums "Revolution of Compassion," "Delog," and "Trilogy" as a form of passive outreach. She sang with Tex Gabriel, former lead guitarist for John Lennon, on her album "Ellinwood Ranch Blues."

=== Animal rescue ===
When Hurricane Katrina stranded thousands of animals in New Orleans in 2005, she adopted a large number of dogs herself and founded Tara's Babies, an animal rescue organization. The target group was dogs on death row, so Tara's Babies continued to rescue dogs from shelters, specializing in fearful and other dogs other shelters rejected. Not long after, she founded the Garuda Aviary, which rescues abused and neglected parrots and educates the public about exotic birds.

== Present day ==
=== Maryland renovations ===
Ahkon Lhamo returned to attend to the aging temple in Maryland. The structure was decades old, and by 2013 it needed repairs and renovations to be in compliance with Montgomery County's Building Use and Occupancy Code. The shrine room, separate from the main building, remained open and housed all teachings and activities, and the prayer vigil. The organization raised $1 million for the building of the new temple as of February 18, 2019. The first phase of the renovations was complete as of 2023, and the Maryland vigil continues unbroken to the present day.

She continues to build new supports for practice. In 2020, she built a lotus pond surrounding a replica of the Statue of Liberty, and most recently, consulted with artisans in Nepal to create an outdoor 13' Guru Rinpoche (Nangsi Zilnon) statue and throne, saying, "Guru Rinpoche is the appearance in the world of every conceivable virtue, without any exception." The statue was consecrated in June 2022.

== KPC Buddhist Relief ==
During the COVID-19 pandemic, to address rising food insecurity, Ahkon Lhamo's efforts turned to the practical production of food for local charities: she began a flock of 90 chickens and donated eggs, and with a six-month start-up grant from Montgomery County, started a 2,400 square foot demonstration and production food garden. The garden continues through the Maxine and James Cable Memorial Food Garden Initiative and has produced hundreds of pounds of fresh vegetables a year, which are delivered to local area food banks and shelters. Additionally, the garden has donated starter plants to other local area shelters and churches to start their own gardens and hosted gardening education workdays so people can learn to grow their own food.

While her temple's sandwiches for the homeless program was forced to pause during the pandemic, Ahkon Lhamo personally packed large boxes of food for local charities such as UpCounty Hub, WUMCO, IROC, Poolesville Little Free Pantry, the First Baptist Church of Silver Spring, and Shepherd's Table. At her urging, KPC Buddhist Relief expanded to offer 1,000 pounds of food per day to these partners, and fulfilled the needs of refugees. Non-sectarian and multicultural, she and KPC Buddhist Relief assisted the United Sikhs to help Ukrainian refugees, aided refugees from Africa and elsewhere, and respond to local emergencies.

== Controversy ==
Jetsunma Ahkon Lhamo's behavior has been questioned by some journalists. According The Los Angeles Times' Maria Jaoudi, Jetsunma Ahkon Lhamo is "a rather complicated, if not thoroughly secular, person, given to certain personal and temperamental indulgences (megalomania, lying, verbal abuse, to name a few). She is also physically violent; in one instance, she hits a disciple in the face. She also accepts a $100,000 yearly salary while her students go into debt to pay her."

Some of her controversial behavior is outlined in The Buddha From Brooklyn (2000) by The Washington Post reporter Martha Sherrill. The book discusses numerous financial and sexual scandals that rocked Jetsunma Ahkon Lhamo's community. Pico Iyer, in a review of the book for Tricycle, notes some controversial behavior such as:

By the time The Buddha from Brooklyn approaches its climax, fully fifty percent of the center's operating expenses are going to Jetsunma's salary and students who are slow to pay their rent are condemned as “anti-Buddhists.” In the book's most horrifying section, when Jetsunma learns that a monk and a quiet nun are growing intimate, she humiliates them publicly, slaps the young nun (who has been in a hospital, earlier that same evening, after being involved in a car crash), and virtually pulverizes them with a terrifying poem of hellfire that combines spiritual blackmail with near-obscenity.

According to Robert Bell of The Austin Chronicle, Sherrill's book depicts "a young lama who once held great promise and possessed the best of intentions, but whose steady decline into self-absorption and megalomania have ultimately acted as a corrupting influence on all those around her." He also notes that Sherrill's books depicts how "the greater cause of bringing the Dharma to the West is frequently used to justify Jetsunma's financial, physical, and emotional abuses, as well as her sexual indiscretions."

Chris Barsanti of the Chicago Tribune likewise describes how Sherrill's books reveals that Jetsunma Ahkon Lhamo is "a stunningly egotistic demagogue of the most insidious kind...She has little grasp of Buddhist precepts, and one visitor to the monastery remarks, "It was weird how the monks all had jobs, went to work during the day, and came home and watched `The Simpsons' on TV." There are terrifyingly cult-like meetings in which Jetsunma verbally abuses and even hits monks who have displeased--or just disagreed with--her."

== Publications and podcasts ==
- Jetsunma Ahkön Norbu Lhamo. Buddhism for Beginners podcast, Ahkön Norbu Lhamo.
- Jetsunma Ahkön Norbu Lhamo. The Practice of Generosity, publisher unknown, Ahkön Norbu Lhamo, 1991.
- Jetsunma Ahkön Norbu Lhamo. Stabilizing the Mind: A meditational technique to develop spaciousness in the mind. Palyul Press, 2005, ISBN 1-4116-6102-8
- Jetsunma Ahkön Norbu Lhamo. Vow of Love: Living an extraordinary life of compassion, Kunzang Odsal Palyul Changchub Choling, 2017. ISBN 0985524510
- Jetsunma Ahkön Norbu Lhamo. Boundless Treasury of Blessings: A Collection of Prayers, Teachings and Poems. Kunzang Odsal Palyul Changchub Choling, 2018. ISBN 0985524553

== Discography ==
- Invocation (cassette). Sky Dancer. 1992.
- Revolution of Compassion (CD). CD Baby. 2007.{{
- Delog (CD). CD Baby. 2007.
- Ellinwood Ranch Blues (CD). CD Baby. 2008.

== See also ==
- Ngagmo
- Vajrayogini
- Yidam
