= Lodro =

Lodro may refer to:

- Dzongsar Khyentse Chökyi Lodrö (1893–1959), Tibetan lama, teacher of many of the major figures in 20th century Tibetan Buddhism
- Jigme Lodro Rinpoche (born 1969), born in Golok-Dhome of Tibet, recognized as the reincarnation of Genyen Dharmata
- Khentrul Lodro Thaye Rinpoche, Tibetan Buddhist scholar and khenchen (double doctorate)
- Mipham Chokyi Lodro, the 14th Shamarpa
