= NNI =

NNI may refer to:

- Network-to-network interface, used to interconnect signalling networks in telecommunications
- Net national income, a term in economics
- National Nanotechnology Initiative, a U.S. government cross-agency coordinating program
- Ngagyur Nyingma Institute, a monastic college for Buddhist studies & research
- Numéro national d'identification, the national identification number used in France
- Neural Network Intelligence, an open source AutoML toolkit for neural architecture search and hyper-parameter tuning
- Novo Nordisk Inc., a Danish pharmaceutical company
