= Dechen Wangmo =

Dechen Wangmo is a common Bhutanese and Tibetan female name.

- Dechen Wangmo (Tibetan Buddhist) (c. 1925–2011), Tibetan Buddhist
- Dechen Wangmo (politician) (c. 1976-), Bhutanese politician who was made Minister for Health in November 2018
- Dechen Wangmo, Bhutanese singer, finalist for Bhutan in the ABU Radio Song Festival
