= Doddaharve =

- village
- Location in Karnataka, India Doddaharve (India)
- Coordinates: 12.393910°N 75.954870°E
- Country: India
- State: Karnataka
- District: Mysore
- Talukas: Piriyapatna

Government
  - Body: Gram panchayat

Population (2001)
  - Total: 5,064

Languages
  - Official: Kannada
- Time zone: UTC+5:30 (IST)
- Postal code: 571104 (Bylakuppe)
- ISO 3166 code: IN-KA
- Vehicle registration: KA 45
- Website: karnataka.gov.in

Doddaharve is a village in the southern state of Karnataka, India. It is located 8 km from Bylakuppe.

== Demographics ==
As of 2001 India census, Doddaharve had a population of 5064 with 4221 males and 843 females.

== See also ==
- Mysore
- Districts of Karnataka
