= Ngagyur Nyingma Institute =

Higher buddhist studies and research center of Nyingma school

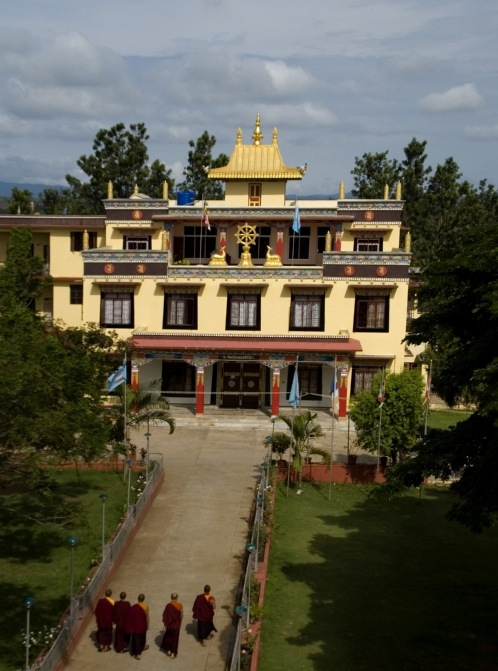
- Ngagyur Nyingma Institute Higher Buddhist Studies & Research Center
- Type: Buddhist Institute
- Established: 1978, Founder: Drubwang Padma Norbu Rinpoche
- President: Karma Kuchen
- Principal: Khenpo Pasang Tenzin (Now); Khenpo Gawang (2024-2025); Khenpo Tshultrim Tandar (2023-2024); Khenpo Ngawang Samten (2022-2023); Khenpo Sonam Norbu (2021-2022); Khenpo Kunzang Dechen (2020-2021); Khenpo Sonam Dorji (2019-2020); Khenpo Tsewang Norbu (2018-2019); Khenpo Tashi Namgyal (2017-2018); Khenpo Pasang Tshering (2016-2017); Khenpo Yeshe Dorje (2015-2016); Khenpo Tadrin Sridthub (2014-2015); Khenpo Tsewang Sonam (2013-2014); Khenpo Tshering Dorje (2012-2013); Khenpo Jigme Kelzang (2011-2012); Khenpo Jamyang Tshering (2010-2011); Khenpo Tashi Tshering (2009-2010)
- Students: 1086 (In 2017)
- Doctoral students: 213
- Location: Namdroling Monastery, Bylakuppe, Mysuru, Karnataka, India
- Website: www.palyul.org

The Ngagyur Nyingma Institute (Tib: སྔ་འགྱུར་མཐོ་སློབ་མདོ་སྔགས་རིག་པའི་འབྱུང་གནས་གླིང་།, Wylie: snga 'gyur mtho slob mdo sngags rig pa'i 'byung gnas gling) of Namdroling Monastery was established by Penor Rinpoche in 1978.

== General Information ==
Students from various countries go to Ngagyur Nyingma Institute for higher Buddhist studies. For nine years, they mainly study the Sutra and Tantra teachings of the Buddha, as well as the commentaries written by great Indian and Tibetan scholars. As an ancillary subjects, they study Buddhist philosophy in general, poetry, composition, grammar and the history of Tibet, as well as English and other languages. During the nine-year course, students complete four years for a མཐའ་བྲལ་སྨྲ་བའི་དབང་ཕྱུག tha-bral smra-ba'i dbang-phyug degree (equivalent to a Higher Secondary degree), two more years for a ཕར་ཕྱིན་རབ་འབྱམས། phar-phyin rab-'byams degree (equivalent to a bachelor's degree) and the last three years for a མདོ་རྒྱུད་ངེས་དོན་བསྟན་པའི་སྣང་བྱེད་ཆེན་པོ། mdo-rgyud nges-don btan-pa'i nyin-byed chen-po degree (equivalent to a master's degree). After the completion of the nine-year course, earning these three degrees, they are then placed in various monasteries and Dharma centres in Himalayan countries and abroad to render their service of teaching Buddhism. Ngagyur Nyingma Institute also provides an option to continue one’s study and research towards a PhD.

== Branches ==
- Ngagyur Nyingma Research Center

== Related academy ==
- Namdrol Ling Jr. High School (Yeshe Wodsal Sherab Raldri Ling)
- Ngagyur Nyingma Nunnery Institute

== Related editorial committee ==
- Ngagyur Rigzod Editorial Committee
- Rigzod Computer Section
- Padma Mani Translation Committee
- Tshogyal Editorial Committee
- International Nyingma Dictionary Editorial Committee
- Palyul Dictionary Editorial Committee
