= Lingpa =

Lingpa (Wylie: gling pa) is a Tibetan title, used great tertöns. It is not to be confused with being the person's surname. Notable people with the title include:

- Dudjom Lingpa (1835–1904), a meditation master, visionary and terton of the Nyimgma tradition of 'Mantrayana'
- Jigme Lingpa (1729–1798), one of the most important tertöns of Tibet
- Karma Lingpa (1326–1386), a great tertön, is embraced as a reincarnation of Chokro Luyi Gyaltsen, a great master
- Orgyen Chokgyur Lingpa (1829–1870), a terton or treasure revealer and contemporary of Jamyang Khyentse Wangpo and Jamgon Kongtrul
- Orgyen Kusum Lingpa (1934–2009), a terton and Nyingma lineage holder within Tibetan Buddhism
- Pema Lingpa (1450–1521), a famous saint and siddha of the Nyingma school of Tibetan Buddhism
