= Ngagyur Nyingma Nunnery =

Nunnery in Bylakuppe, India

- Tibetan transcription(s); Tibetan: མཚོ་རྒྱལ་བཤད་སྒྲུབ་དར་རྒྱས་གླིང་། Wylie transliteration: Mtsho-rgyal-shad-sgrub-dar-rgyas-ling
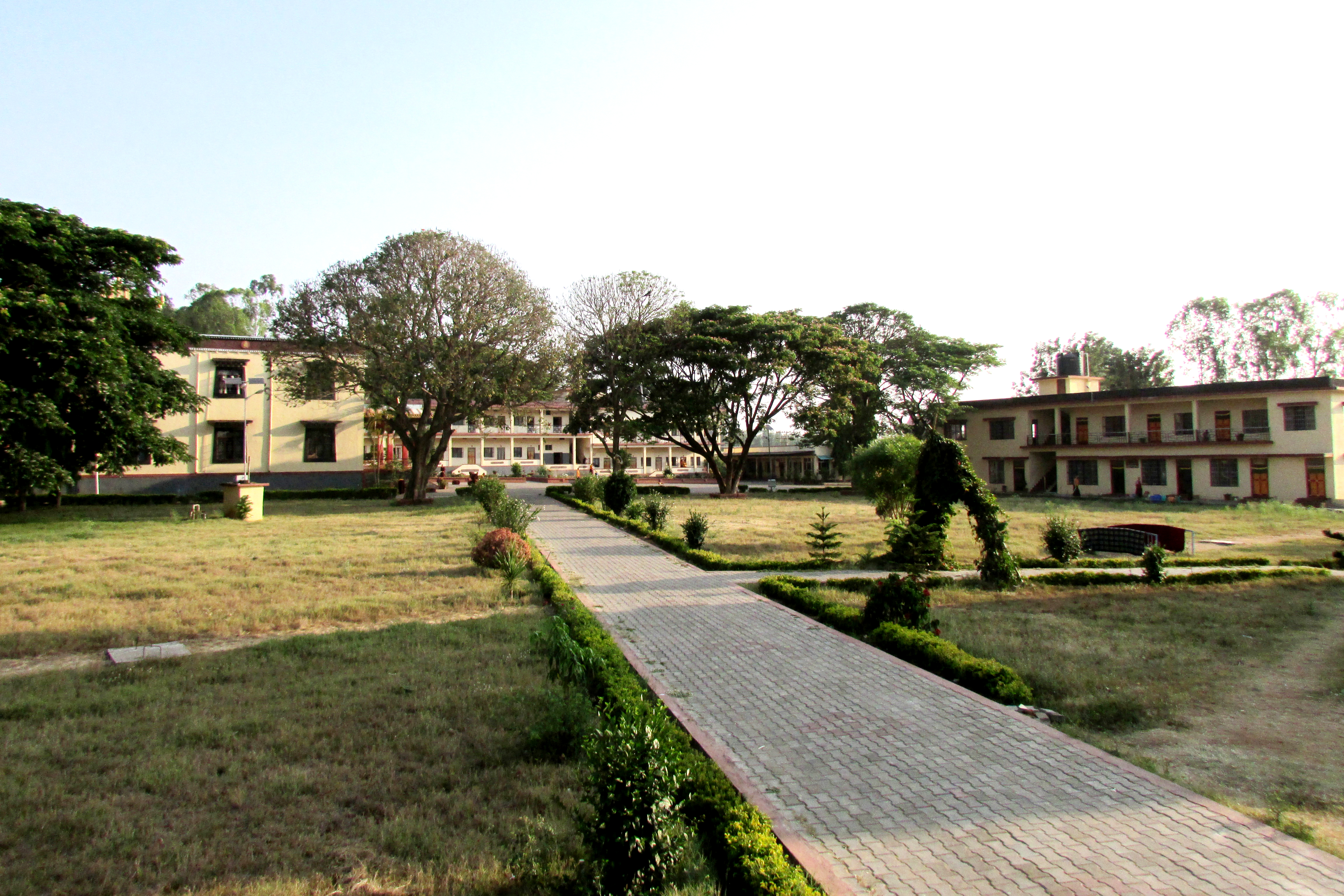
- Ngagyur Nyingma Nunnery, Bylakuppe, Mysuru

Religion
- Affiliation: Tibetan Buddhism
- Sect: Nyingma
- Festivals: Losar, bKama'i Drubchen, Mipham Anniversary, Gutor
- Leadership: Karma Kuchen, 12th Throne-Holder of Palyul Lineage

Location
- Location: Namdroling Monastery, Bylakuppe, Mysuru, Karnataka
- Country: India

Architecture
- Founder: Drubwang Padma Norbu Rinpoche
- Established: 1993

The Ngagyur Nyingma Nunnery or Tsogyal Shedrub Dargyeling Nunnery:(Tibetan: མཚོ་རྒྱལ་བཤད་སྒྲུབ་དར་རྒྱས་གླིང་།, Wylie: Mtsho-rgyal-shad-sgrub-dar-rgyas-ling) is the Tibetan Buddhist nunnery of Namdroling Monastery, consecrated on 27 November 1993 in Bylakuppe, India. Namdroling Monastery is the largest teaching center of the Nyingma tradition in the world, which is the original lineage tradition of Tibetan Buddhism.

== History ==
In order to give equal opportunity to women in the study and practice of Dharma, Drubwang Padma Norbu Rinpoche established the nunnery in 1993, which is situated at a distance of one kilometer from Namdroling Monastery. There are 1397 nuns who have enrolled in this nunnery so far, of which more than 681 are currently resident. The older nuns engage themselves in the recitation and sadhanas of the Three Roots, as well as the Tsalung and Dzogchen practices. The younger nuns enter the Jr. High School at the nunnery and study the basic Tibetan grammars and basic Buddhist teachings, after which they enter the nuns' Institute.

== Branches ==
- Ngagyur Nyingma Nunnery Institute
- Drubnyi Gatshal Ling Retreat Center
- Junior High School
- Tsogyal Editorial Committee
