= Dechen Wangmo (Tibetan Buddhist) =

Life of Dechen Wangmo

Jetsun Dechen Wangmo (Tibetan: བདེ་ཆེན་དབང་མོ, Wylie: bde chen dbang mo, c.1925 - 2011) was a Tibetan Buddhist.

== Family ==
Wangmo was the daughter of a noble family which was said to be descended from the legendary King Gaesar of Ling. She was Minling Khenchen Rinpoche's mother and the aunt of the 11th Mindrolling Trichen Rinpoche, the 11th throne holder of Mindrolling. She was the sister of Jetsun Tsewang Lhamo, and in 1982 they and others left Tibet for Mindrolling monastery in India, a Vajrayana monastery. She died at age 86 in 2011 and was cremated at Mindrolling monastery.
