= Ngagyur Nyingma Nunnery Institute =

Buddhist institution in Bylakuppe, India

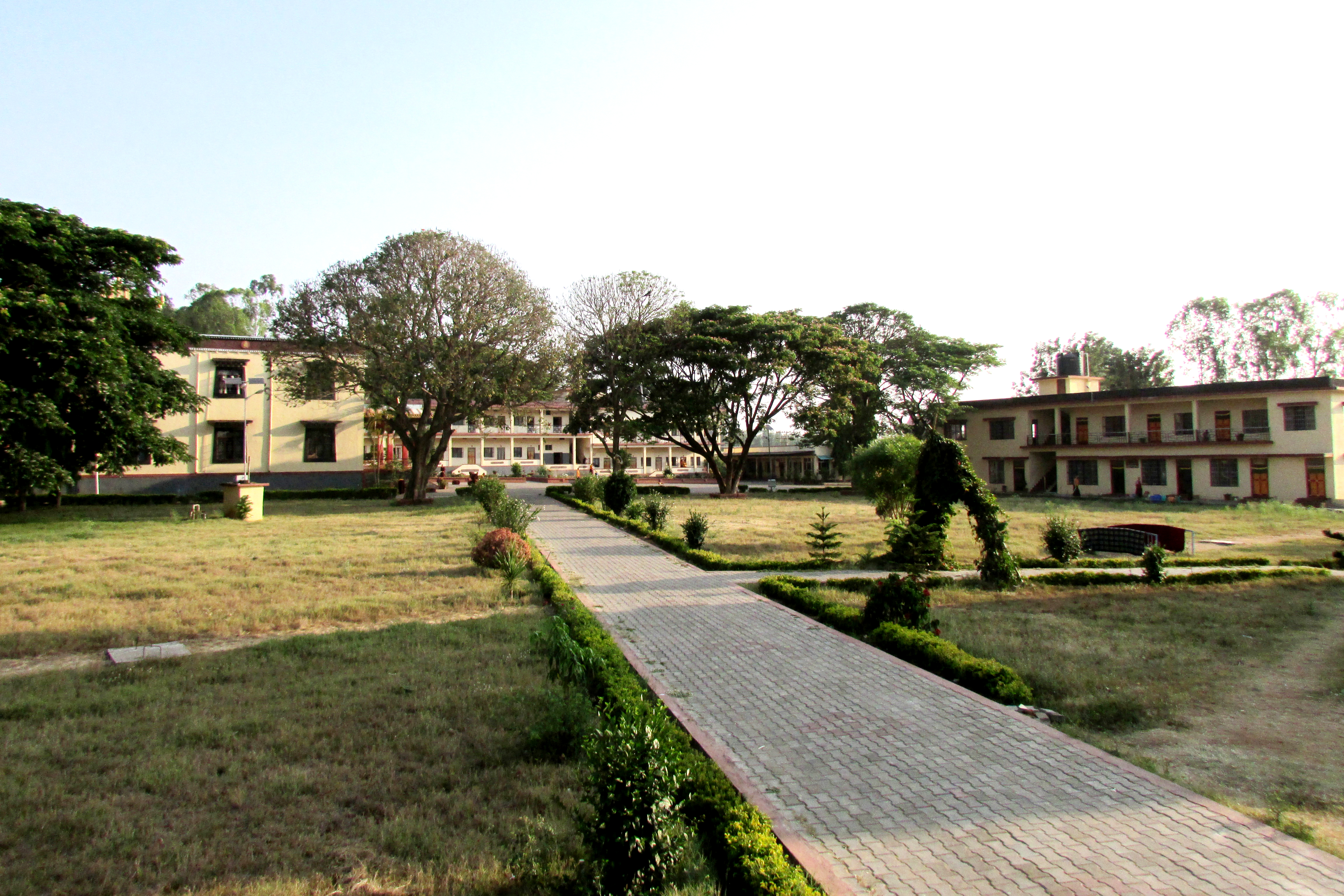
- Ngagyur Nyingma Nunnery Institute
- Type: Buddhist Institute
- Established: 1995, Founder: Penor Rinpoche
- President: Karma Kuchen
- Principal: Khenpo Pasang Tenzin
- Students: 227 (In 2017)
- Location: Ngagyur Nyingma Nunnery, Bylakuppe, Karnataka, India
- Website: palyul.org

The Ngagyur Nyingma Nunnery Institute (Tibetan: སྔ་འགྱུར་མཐོ་སློབ་མཚོ་རྒྱལ་བཤད་སྒྲུབ་ཐོས་བསམ་དགའ་བའི་ཚལ།) was founded by Penor Rinpoche in 1995. Buddhist nuns there study a nine-year course on sutra and tantra along with poetry, grammar, composition and so on, a syllabus virtually identical to that of Ngagyur Nyingma Institute. In 2002, the institute began sending teachers to teach in other nunneries including to India, Bhutan, and Nepal.

== Related institutions ==
- Ngagyur Nyingma Nunnery Jr. High School
- Ngagyur Nyingma Institute (NNI)

== List of former principals ==
- Khenpo Gawang (2024-2025)
- Khenpo Tshultrim Tandar (2023-2024)
- Khenpo Ngawang Samten (2022-2023)
- Khenpo Sonam Norbu (2021-2022)
- Khenpo Kunzang Dechen (2020-2021)
- Khenpo Sonam Dorji (2019-2020)
- Khenpo Tsewang Norbu (2018-2019)
- Khenpo Tashi Namgyal (2017-2018)
- Khenpo Pasang Tshering (2016-2017)
- Khenpo Yeshe Dorje (2015-2016)
- Khenpo Tadrin Sridthub (2014-2015)
- Khenpo Tsewang Sonam (2013-2014)
- Khenpo Tshering Dorje (2012-2013)
- Khenpo Jigme Kelzang (2011-2012)
- Khenpo Jamyang Tshering (2010-2011)
- Khenpo Tashi Tshering (2009-2010)
