= Khentrul Lodro Thaye Rinpoche =

Tibetan Lama

Khentrul Lodrö Thayé Rinpoche (Khentrul Rinpoche) is a Tibetan Buddhist lama of the Nyingma school. He is one of the co-abbots of a monastery in Eastern Tibet. He directs the education and spiritual practice of three hundred monks, seventy advanced-degree candidates and twenty full-time retreatants.

Khentrul Rinpoche obtained Khenpo degrees directly from Khenchen Jigme Phuntsok Rinpoche at Larung Gar, from Katog Moktsa Rinpoche at Katog Monastery and from Kyabje Penor Rinpoche at Namdroling. Nowadays, Khentrul Rinpoche is primarily based in the U.S. where he has established Katog Choling Gön in the Ozark Mountains of northwest Arkansas, as well as dozens of branch centers in different states which he travels to teach at on a yearly basis.

== Early life and education ==
=== Early life ===
At the age of seven he began the formal practice of the Dharma by taking monastic ordination at a supportive foundation. He left his home and family when he was a young child to go and live with his maternal uncle, Terton Jigme Dorje, at Katog Mardo Tashi Choling in Tibet.

=== Education ===
Khentrul Rinpoche studied and practiced under Khenchen Jigme Phuntsok Rinpoche for over twenty years at Serthar monastery (Larung Gar), at Katog Monastery under Katog Moktsa Rinpoche in Tibet, and with Penor Rinpoche at Namdroling Monastery in India. He earned Khenpo degrees (equivalent to a PhD in Buddhist philosophy) in each of the monasteries directly from the three of these masters.

== Recognition ==
Katog Moktsa Rinpoche formally recognized Khentrul Rinpoche as a reincarnation (tulku) of Katog Drubtobchhenpo Namkha Gyamtso, a mahasiddha of the Katog lineage. An elaborate enthronement ceremony was held for him at Katog Gonpa's mother monastery in 2006 amongst an assembly of monks, lamas, khenpos, and laypersons. Thus, he is called Khentrul—someone who is both a khenpo and a tulku.

He received the entire Nyingt'hig lineage (including Nyingt'hig Yabzhi, Dzod Dun, Ngalso Korsum, Yeshe Lama, and Chetzun Nyingt'hig), as well as thousands of empowerments, scriptural transmissions, and explanations on the pith instructions for Great Perfection practice. In addition, Khentrul Rinpoche received the rarely bestowed oral transmission of Khenpo Ngakchung's Nyingt'hig lineage. From Dodrubchen Rinpoche, Jigme Phuntsok Rinpoche, Katok Moktsa Rinpoche, and Penor Rinpoche, he received all of the empowerments and scriptural transmissions for the Kama and Terma cycles of the Nyingma school.

He was invited to the U.S. by Chagdud Tulku Rinpoche (shortly before his death), primarily to create and teach a shedra program at Rigdzin Ling. He created an annual shedra at Chagdud Rinpoche's Gonpa center at Rigdzin Ling in Junction City, California in 2003. Since then, the Shedra has continued yearly and since 2010, however it takes place at Rinpoche's primarary seat at Katog Choling Gön located in northwest Arkansas.

As a highly respected teacher, Khentrul Rinpoche attracts thousands of students worldwide. He now leads multiple practice centers in North America, Australia and South Africa. His primary seat is in Ozark Mountains in Northwest Arkansas, where almost four hundred acres of contiguous properties (including private property purchased by practitioners to do retreat) includes a large central temple, stupas, a traditional three year retreat center, smaller temple, dorms, other retreat facilities and natural supports for practice, like mountains, cliffs, caves and streams.

Khentrul Rinpoche also travels to teach in various countries and invites various qualified lamas to teach at the Katog Choling (USA) centers including: Katog Getse Rinpoche, Khenchen Tsultrim Lodro Rinpoche, and Kadak Choying Dorje Lingtrul Rinpoche. He is known for highly emphasizing the Lojong ('Mind Training') teachings and techniques.
