= IXth Minling Khenchen Rinpoche =

Tibetan Buddhist monk

The IXth Minling Khenchen Rinpoche
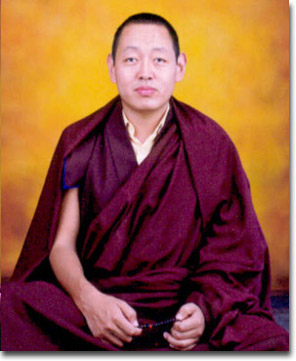
- Title: Khenchen

Personal life
- Born: Jigmey Namgyal; 1970 (age 55–56)
- Occupation: Head Abbot In-Charge of Ngagyur Nyingma College at Mindrolling Monastery

Religious life
- Religion: Tibetan Buddhism
- School: Nyingma
- Lineage: Mindrolling Family of the Divine Nyok Lineage

Senior posting
- Based in: Clement Town, near Dehra Dun in Uttaranchal, India
- Reincarnation: Eight Minling Khenchen generations
- Website: www.KhenchenRinpoche.org

According to Tibetan Buddhism the IXth Minling Khenchen Rinpoche is the successive reincarnation of the Minling Kenrab lineage, co-administrator of Mindrolling Monastery and Head Abbot In-Charge of Ngagyur Nyingma College in India, Vajrayana master, scholar, and teacher.

== General background ==
Mindrolling, founded in the Drachi Valley of Central Tibet in 1676 by the Dharma King Chögyal Terdag Lingpa, is originally one the six principal Nyingma monasteries of Tibet. Mindrolling lineage holders are traditionally held by the successive descendants of its founder. After the Chinese invasion of 1959, the great masters of this tradition fled to India and the seat of the Mindrolling lineage was then re-established near Dehra Dun in Uttaranchal, India. It now houses one of the largest Buddhist Five Science Colleges in existence today which is under the direction of the current Khenrab lineage holder, Minling Khenchen Rinpoche who is also one of the two current administrators of the Mindrolling Monastery. An unbroken lineage continues up to this day, and Mindrolling is known throughout the Dharma world, both as the lineage and monastery dedicated completely to Dharma activities and as a main center for maintaining the secret Vajrayana Doctrine.

== Reincarnations ==
According to Tibetan Buddhism Jigmey Namgyal has reincarnated from one generational Minling Khenchen to the next for the last 360 years as the lineage holder of the Khenrab branch of the Mindrolling tradition which originated in Tibet as the holder of the Buddhist teachings and vinayas (precepts developed over time to encourage mindfulness and reflection in actions of body and speech - qualities which enhance mind training and discipline). For his current birth, he was confirmed as the reincarnation of the 8th Minling Khenchen Rinpoche, Ngawang Khentse Norbu, by the 14th Dalai Lama, the 16th Gyalwa Karmapa and Lhatog Rinpoche. Being born into the Mindrolling lineage, the Jigmey Namgyal, also known as Khenchen Rinpoche is proceeded by exceptional masters who have held this lineage in the past such as Lochen Dharmashri, Gyalsay Tenpai Nyima and the previous Minling Khenchen mentioned above.

== Mentoring masters ==
Khenchen Rinpoche has been mentored by Tibetan masters including the 14th Dalai Lama, his uncle the 11th Minling Trichen Rinpoche, Dilgo Khyentse Rinpoche, Trulshig Rinpoche, Penor Rinpoche, the 16th Gyalwa Karmapa, and Tulku Ugyen Rinpoche.

== Ngagyur Nyingma College ==
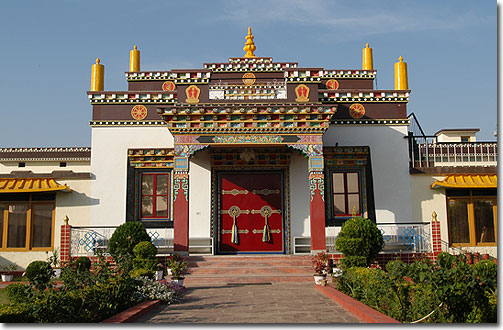
Ngagyur Nyingma College at Mindrolling Monastery

Ngagyur Nyingma College (Five Sciences University) is an institute of advanced Buddhist study for the lineage preservation and spreading of Buddha Dharma. In 1991 the college, one of the largest in India, was inaugurated by Dalai Lama. As Head In-charge, Khenchen Rinpoche presides over this institute, leading a team of Khenpos (a spiritual degree awarded in Tibetan Buddhism after a period of 9 to 15 years of intensive study and considered to be the equivalent of a spiritual doctorate.).

== Affiliations ==
Khenchen Rinpoche is “Head Abbot In-Charge” of Ngagyur Nyingma College at Mindrolling Monastery presiding over the administration, education, and disciplines at Mindrolling's Ngagyur Nyingma College. He is the founder of The Eastern Sun Group and, following a mutual merge of two groups, is now Spiritual Advisor to the renowned charitable organization, known as The Eastern Sun Group Lay Buddhists’ Association, Republic of China. As Vice President of the Great Nyingma Monlam (World Peace Prayers), held annually in Bodhgaya, India, Khenchen Rinpoche is the sponsor of the Nyingma event for 2008, 2010, and 2012. Rinpoche continues to teach extensively in Asia, Europe, and North America.

== Projects ==
The projects dependent on Khenchen Rinpoche continue to require his attention and support, especially the recent reconstruction of the monks' living quarters that is becoming dangerously uninhabitable. Rinpoche's other charitable projects, sustained by contributions and donations from supporters, include the Monlam sponsorship for 2012; the Buddhist Retreat Centre which is located in Thimpu, Bhutan and will have a total of ten rooms and a shrine hall; the Ngagyur Nyingma College Library in memorial of the well-known Mindrolling library in Tibet; and “Project Hope” which will be a school of twenty classrooms aimed at uplifting orphaned and underprivileged children in and around the area of Dehradun, Uttaranchal, India.

== Awards ==
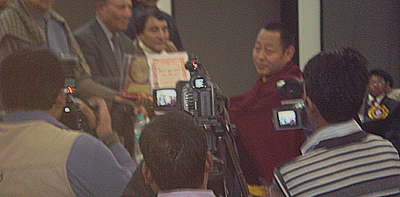
Minling Khenchen Rinpoche receives awards

Khenchen Rinpoche has received the Bharat Jyoti Award, Bharat Gaurav Award (pride of India) and Certificate of Excellence Award for his services, performance, and responsibilities.

== See also ==
- Tibetan Buddhism
- Mindrolling Monastery
- Padmasambhava
