= Namdroling Monastery =

Tibetan Buddhist monastery in Bylkuppe, Karnataka, India

- Tibetan transcription(s); Tibetan: ཐེག་མཆོག་རྣམ་གྲོལ་བཤད་སྒྲུབ་དར་རྒྱས་གླིང་། Wylie transliteration: Theg-mchog-rnam-grol-bshad-sgrub-dar-rgyas-gling
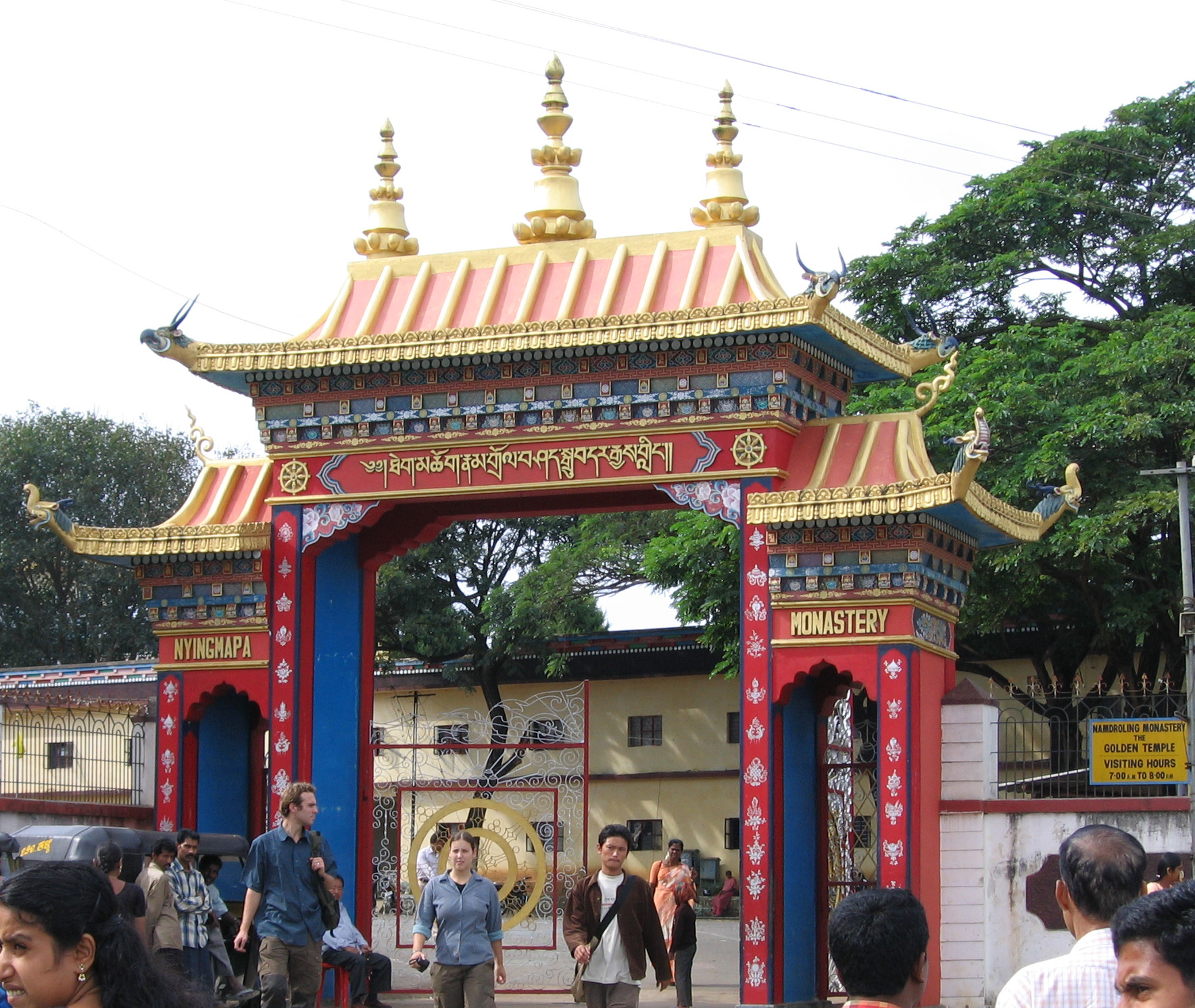
- Entrance gate of the Namdroling

Religion
- Affiliation: Tibetan Buddhism
- Sect: Nyingma
- Festivals: Losar, Drubchen, bKa-ma'i Drubchod, Sagadawa, Mipham Anniversary, Longchen Anniversary, Gutor etc;
- Leadership: Karma Kuchen, 12th Throneholder of Palyul Lineage

Location
- Location: Namdroling, Bylakuppe, Mysore, Karnataka India
- Interactive map of Namdroling Monastery
- Coordinates: 12°25′49.8″N 75°58′2.53″E

Architecture
- Founder: Kyabje Drubwang Padma Norbu Rinpoche, also known as Penor Rinpoche

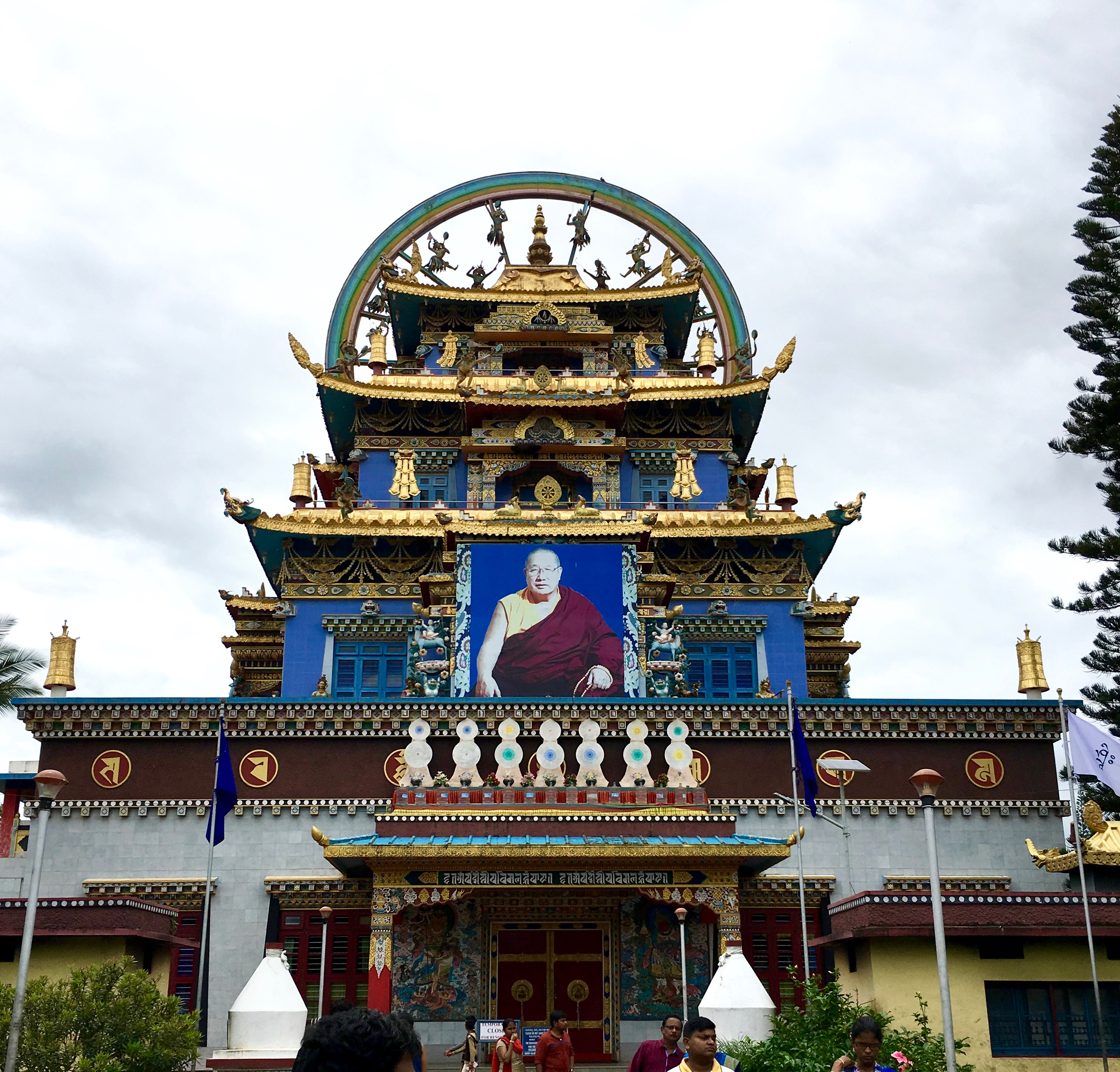
Outer view of Namdroling Monastery

The Thegchog Namdrol Shedrub Dargye Ling (བོད་ཡིག ཐེག་མཆོག་རྣམ་གྲོལ་བཤད་སྒྲུབ་དར་རྒྱས་གླིང་།) (Wylie: theg mchog rnam grol bshad sgrub dar rgyas gling), informally known as Namdroling Monastery (or ನಮ್ಡ್ರೋಲಿಂಗ್ ವಿಹಾರ, Namdroling Vihara) is the largest teaching center of the Nyingma lineage of Tibetan Buddhism in the world. Located in Bylakuppe, part of the Mysuru district of the state of Karnataka, the monastery is home to a sangha community of more than five thousand monks and nuns and qualified teachers, a junior high school named Yeshe Wodsal Sherab Raldri Ling, a Buddhist philosophy college or shedra for both monks and nuns, a home for the elderly, and a hospital.

== History ==
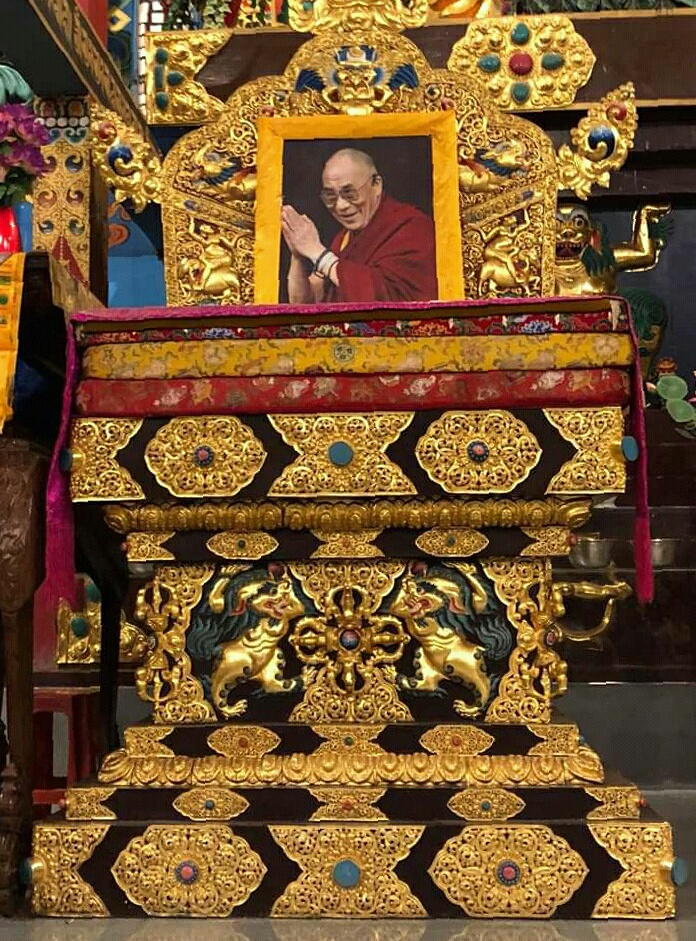
The Dalai Lama at Namdroling Monastery

The monastery was established by the 11th throneholder of the Palyul lineage, the 3rd Drubwang Padma Norbu Rinpoche in 1963. It was founded after his 1959 escape from Tibet which was prompted by the 1957 arrest of Palyul's then-head Khenpo, the 4th Karma Kuchen; he was tortured to death by China's forces by 1958.

The Palyul Monastery and it 400 branches is considered one of the Nyingma school's "Six Mother Monasteries" in Tibet, before China's forces demolished the monastery and its branches in the late 1950s. Palyul Monastery's reconstruction by Penor Rinpoche began in the late 1970s, and by 1983 Penor Rinpoche was again giving teachings and ordaining sangha members in Tibet.

Namdroling Monastery is considered a seat of Palyul Monastery's lineage in exile. Its full formal name is Thegchog Namdrol Shedrub Dargyeling, or Namdroling for short. Its initial structure was a temple constructed from bamboo, covering an area of approximately 80 square feet (7.4 m^{2}); its founder Penor Rinpoche lived in a tent. Namdroling was constructed on the jungle land that the Indian government granted to Tibetans in exile for their resettlement. The initial challenges included elephants, a lack of roads and of funds, and other tropical dangers. Namdroling has grown into the largest Nyingma school monastery in the world.

== Branches ==
- Ngagyur Nyingma Institute (NNI)
- Rigzod Computer Section (RCS)
- Ngagyur Nyingma Nunnery (NNN)
- Ngagyur Nyingma Nunnery Institute (NNNI)

== Buildings - Timeline ==
- On 17 February 1978, the Buddhist College ("Shedra") was constructed and completed.
- A new temple, the "Padmasambhava Buddhist Vihara" (known by locals as the "Golden Temple") was inaugurated on 24 September 1999. The temple has space for several thousand monks.
- On 27 November 1993, the Ngagyur Nyingma Nunnery mTsho-rGyal bShad-Drub Dargyas-Ling was established.
- In 2004 Zangdog Palri Temple a temple to the main Nyingma (old school) Buddha, Guru Rinpoche was built and inaugurated on 13 December of that year.

As of 2016, the lodging facilities alone for the school include three buildings with over 200 rooms. The population fluctuates as monks attend or complete studies at Namdroling. A recent census had the population in excess of 4,000 monks and 800 nuns.

== Ceremonies ==
Namdroling Monastery hosts several ceremonies yearly. Of particular interest is Tibetan New Year (Losar), based on the Tibetan lunisolar calendar; dates are not static but usually the event is in February or March. The monastery hosts traditional Lama Dances, the hanging of giant Thangka from the sides of its buildings, as well as solemn processions throughout the monastery grounds spanning approximately two weeks.

== See also ==
- Namdroling Monastery in India
- Palyul Centers: Namdroling Monastery, South India

== Image gallery ==
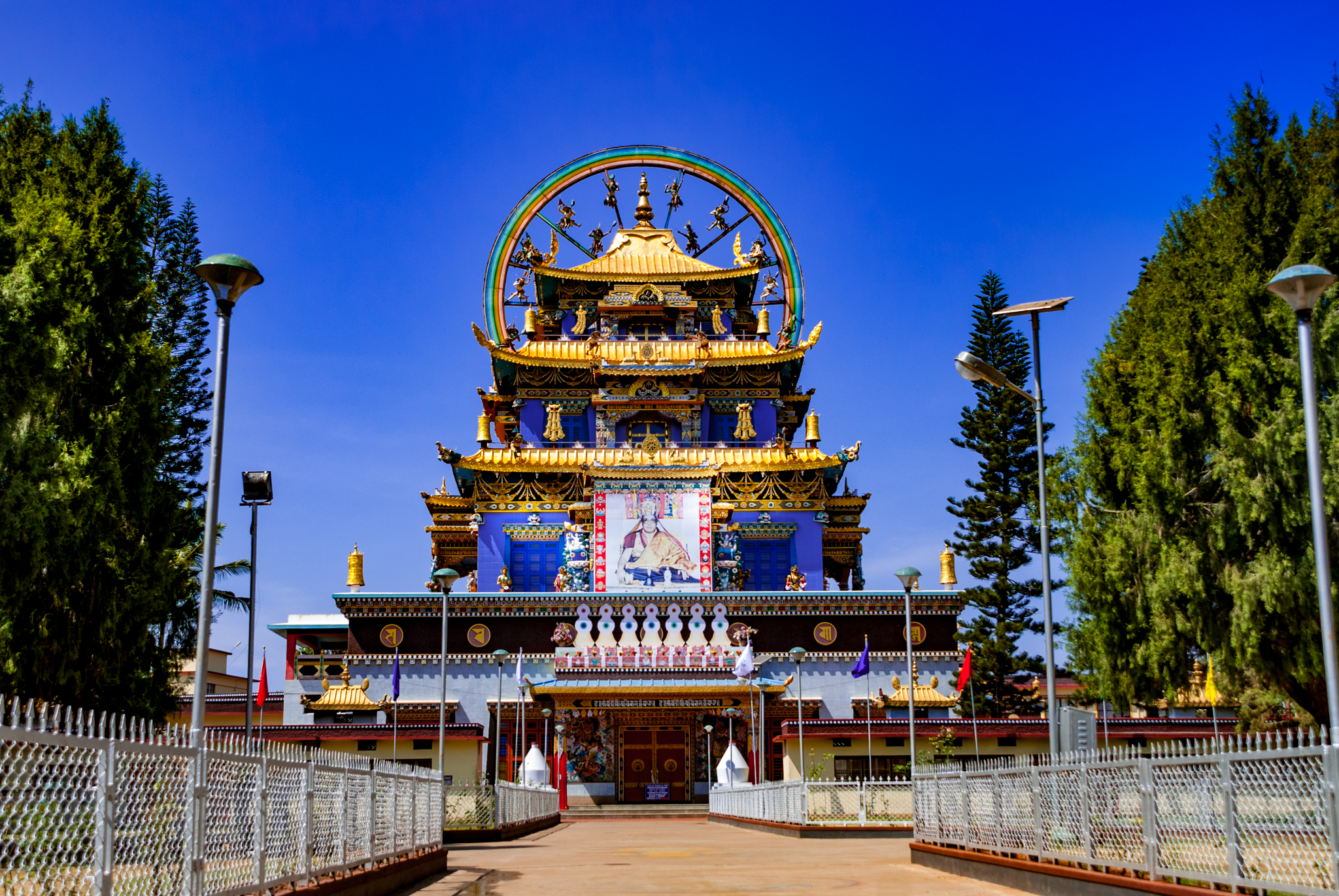
Zangdog Palri Temple

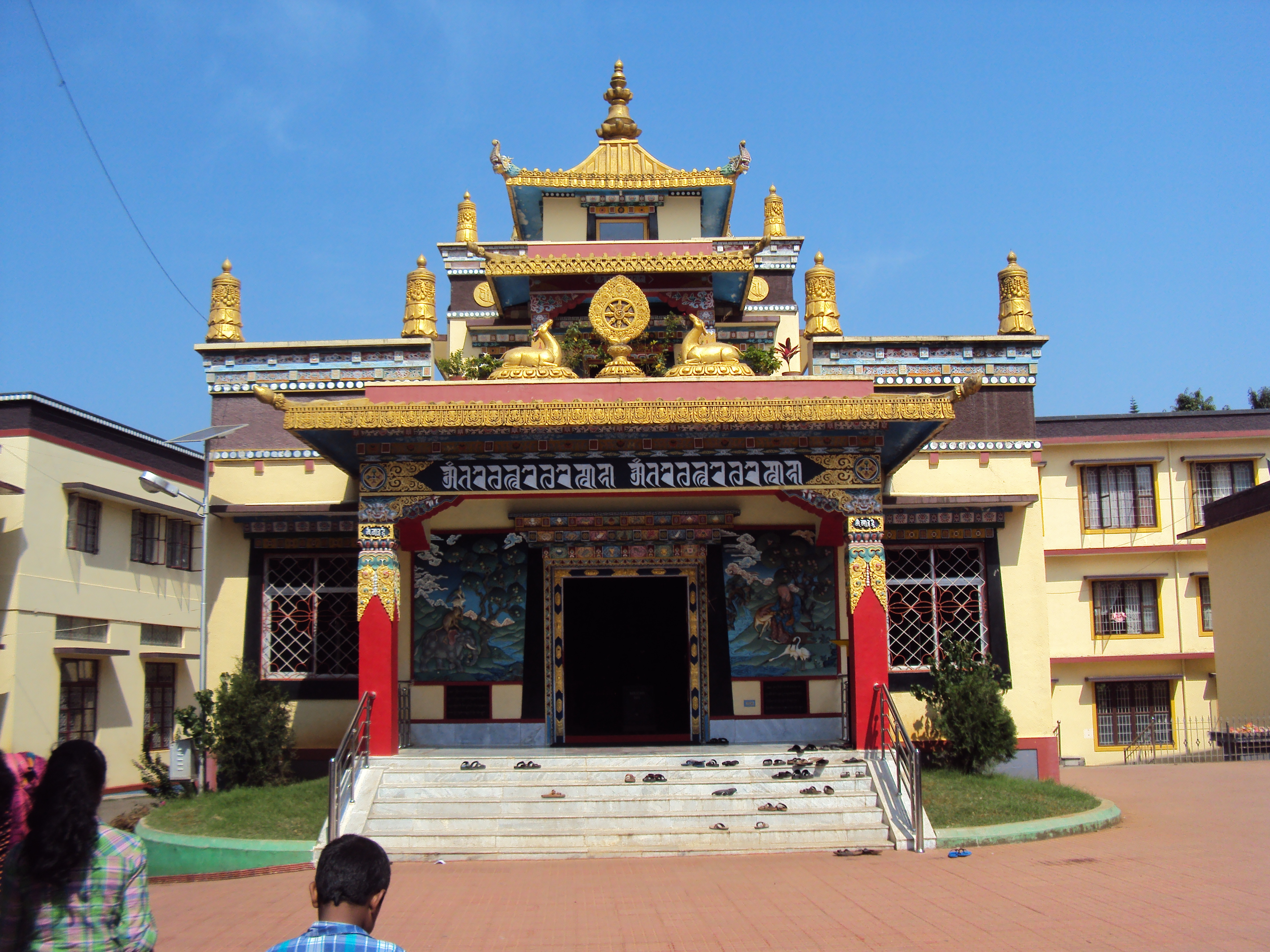
Tara Temple

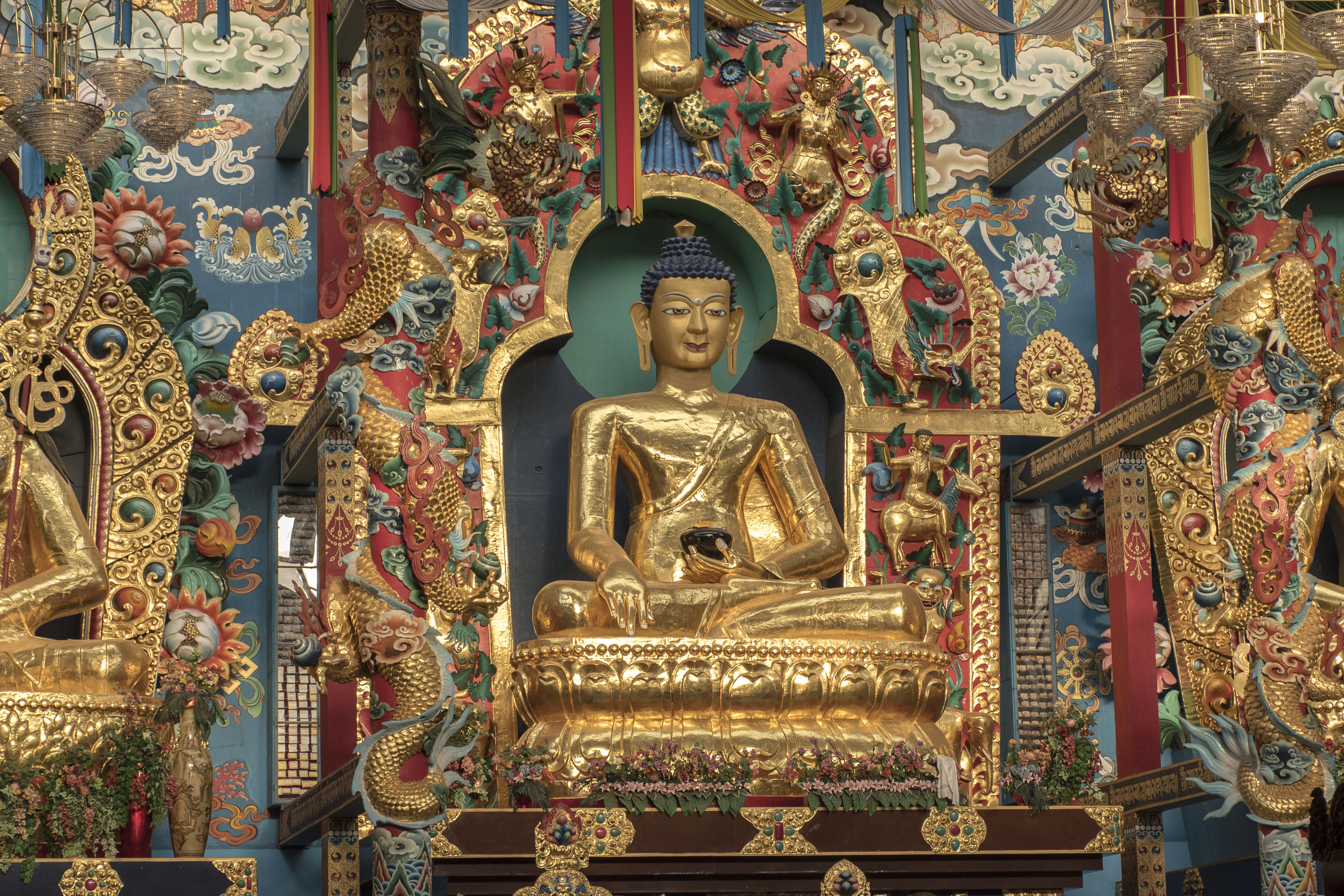
Buddha Statue in Namdroling Monastery

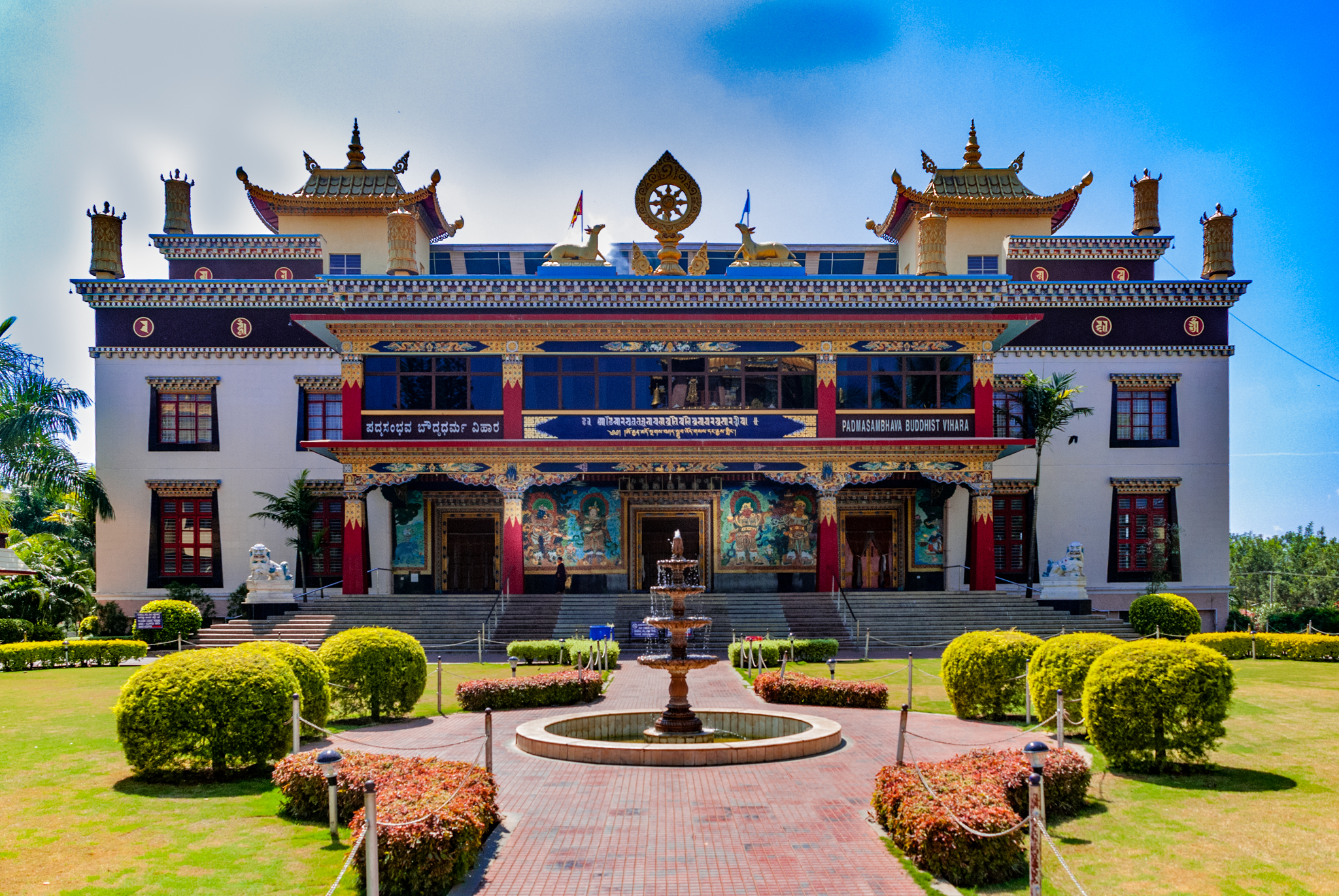
Padmasambhava Buddhist Vihara

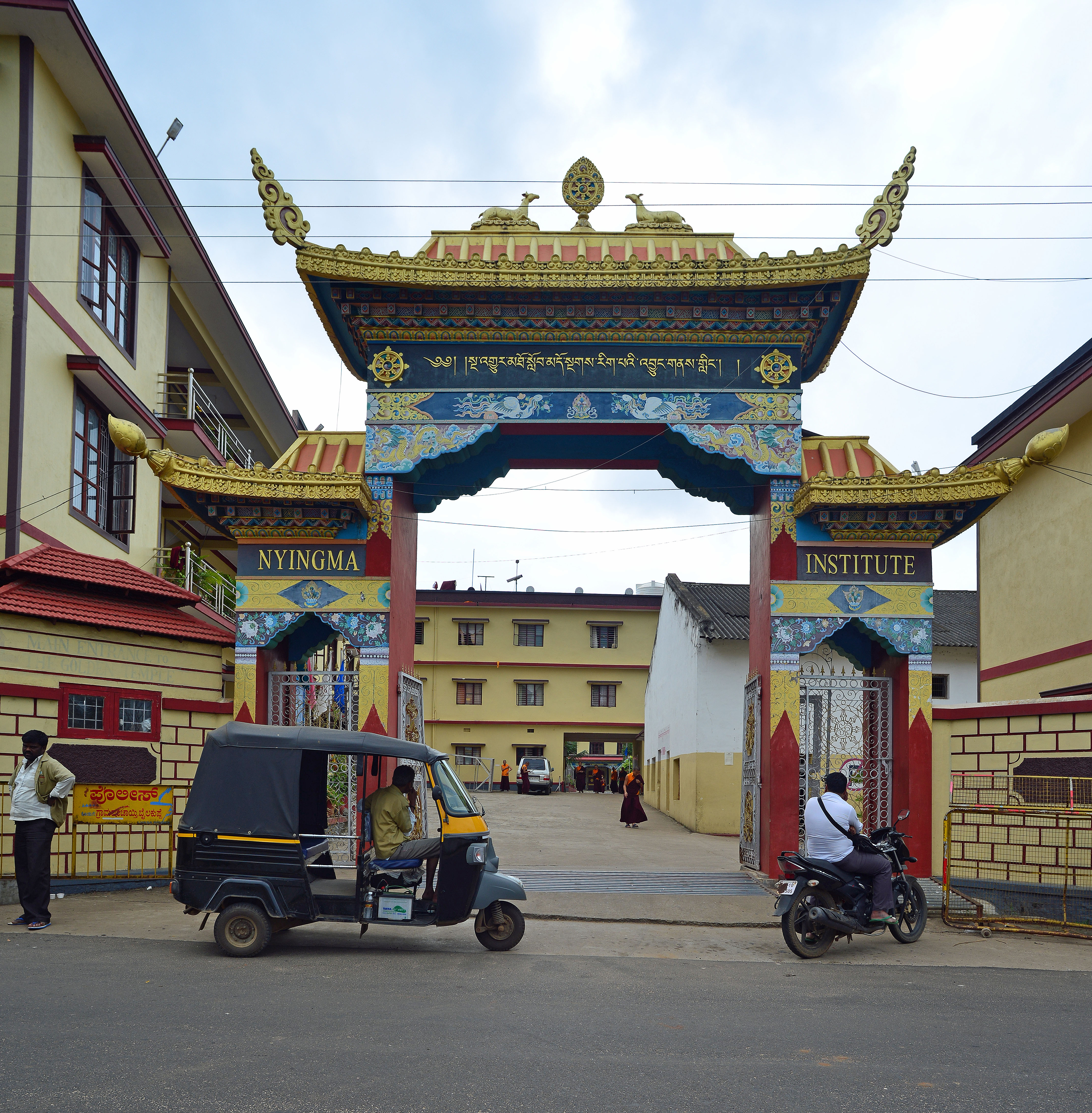
Nyingma Institute Gate

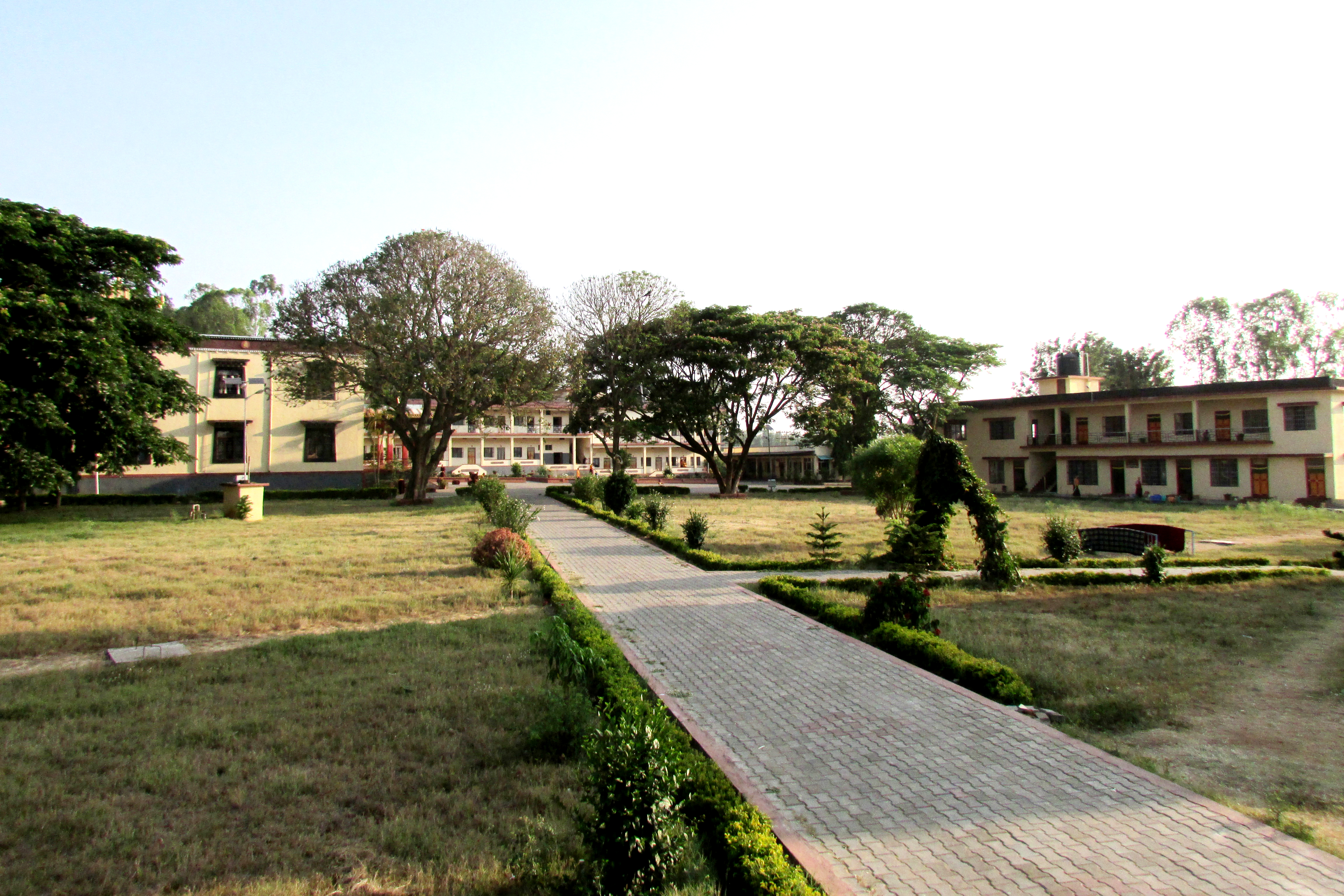
Ngagyur Nyingma Nunnery

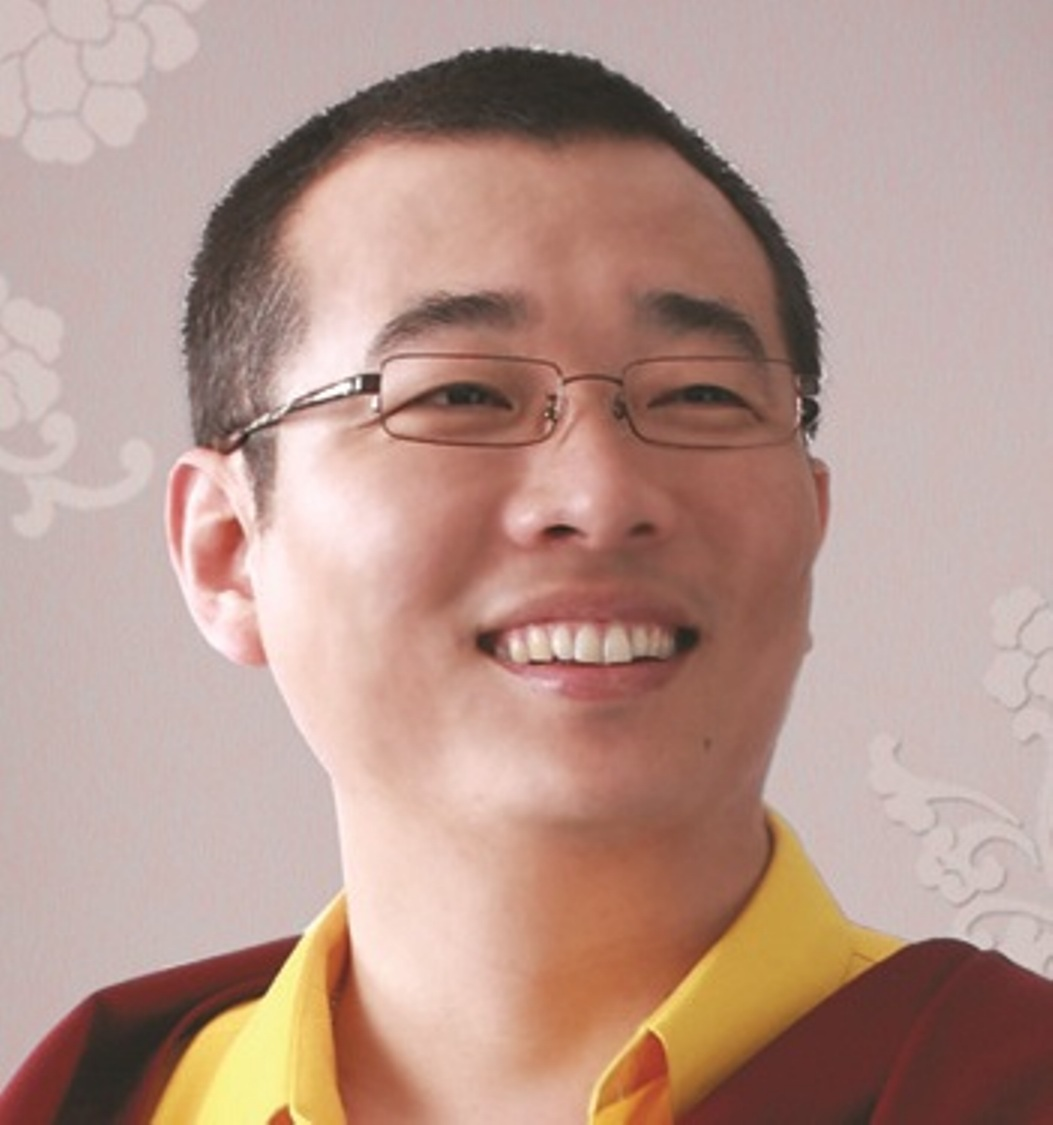
Abbot Gyankhang Tulku Rinpoche
