= Penor Rinpoche =

Palyul Nyingma Tibetan Buddhism, monk and tulku (1933–2009)

Kyabje (His Holiness) 3rd Drubwang Padma Norbu Rinpoche
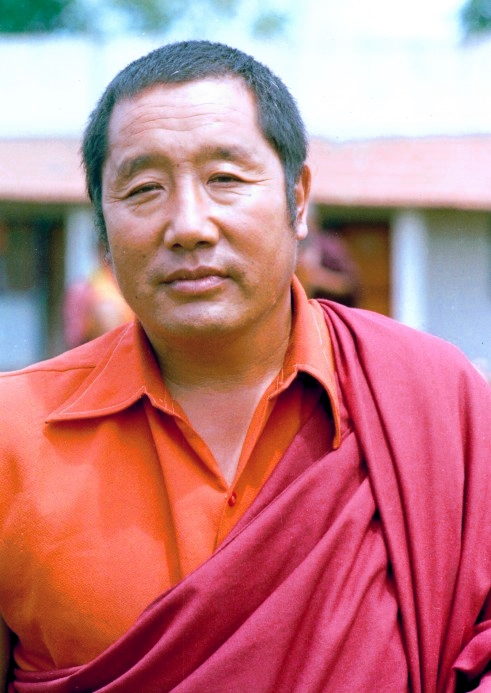
- Penor Rinpoche at Namdroling, 1981
- Title: Kyabje, 11th Throne-Holder of Palyul Lineage, The 3rd Padma Norbu, The 3rd Supreme Head of Nyingma Tradition

Personal life
- Born: Tenzin; 30 January 1933 Powo, Kham, Tibet
- Died: 27 March 2009 (aged 77) Namdroling Monastery, Bylakuppe, Mysuru, India
- Parents: Sonam Gyurmed (father); Dzomkyid (mother)
- Other names: Penor, Thubten Legshed Chokyi Drayang, Do-ngag Shedrub Tenzin Chog-lei Namgyal
- Website: http://www.palyul.org/, http://www.namdroling.net/

Religious life
- Religion: Tibetan Buddhism
- Temple: Padmasambhava Buddhist Vihara, the "Golden Temple of Namdroling Monastery"
- Institute: Ngagyur Nyingma Institute, Ngagyur Nyingma Nunnery Institute
- Founder of: Namdroling Monastery, Ngagyur Tsogyal Shedrupling Nunnery, Tsepal Topkyed Day Care Medical Center, Palyul Changchub Dargyeling, The Palyul Retreat Centre, Thubten Lekshey Ling
- School: Nyingma
- Lineage: Palyul
- Dharma name: འཇིགས་མེད་ཐུབ་བསྟན་བཤད་སྒྲུབ་ཆོས་ཀྱིས་སྒྲ་དབྱངས་དཔལ་བཟང་པོ། 'Jigs-med-thub-bstan-bshad-sgrub-chos-kyi-sgra-dbyangs-dpal-bzang-po
- Ordination: Gelong (monk), 1952, by Khenpo Chogtrul Chokyi Dawa; Supreme Head of Nyingma, 1993, by the 14th Dalai Lama

Senior posting
- Teacher: 5th Dzogchen Rinpoche Thubtan Choskyi Dorje, Khenpo Ngawang Pelzang, Thubten Chokyi Dawa, Karma Thegchog Nyingpo
- Predecessor: Karma Thegchog Nyingpo
- Successor: Karma Kuchen, 12th Throne-Holder of Palyul Lineage
- Reincarnation: Drubwang Palchen Düpa
- Students: Minling Khenchen Rinpoche, Khentrul Lodro Thaye Rinpoche, Sakyong Mipham, Jetsunma Ahkon Lhamo

Kyabjé 3rd Drubwang Pema Norbu, Lekshe Chokyi Drayang, widely known as Penor Rinpoche (Tibetan: པདྨ་ནོར་བུ་, Wylie: pad ma nor bu, 30 January 1933 – 27 March 2009), was the 11th throneholder of the Palyul Lineage of the Nyingma school of Tibetan Buddhism, and the 3rd Drubwang Padma Norbu. He is recognized as the incarnation of Vimalamitra, an 8th century Buddhist Monk. By the age of 17, he had received the corpus of Payul lineage teachings including Dzogchen teachings, and became a renowned Dzogchen master. He began his escape from Tibet in 1959 with 300 people, and only 30 arrived in India. While working alongside laborers, he rebuilt Palyul Monastery in Karnataka, India, where more than 5,000 Nyingma school monks and nuns study.

He was among the last generation of teachers to complete their traditional monastic training in Tibet prior to going into exile. His efforts to re-establish the Palyul tradition outside Tibet led to the founding of monasteries, nunneries, and retreat centers across India, Nepal, and Tibet, as well as international centers such as the Palyul Retreat Center in New york.

== Biography ==
=== Life in Tibet ===
The Third Drubwang Padma Norbu Rinpoche, Thubten Legshed Chokyi Drayang (Tibetan: ཐུབ་བསྟན་ལེགས་ལེགས་ཤད་ཆོས་ཀྱི་སྒྲ་དབྱངས།, Wylie: thub bstan legs shad chos kyi sgra dbyangs), also known as Do-ngag Shedrub Tenzin Chog-lei Namgyal (Tibetan: ཐུབ་བསྟན་ལེགས་ལེགས་ཤད་ཆོས་ཀྱི་སྒྲ་དབྱངས།, Wylie: mdo sngags shad sgrub bstan 'zin mchog las rnam rgyal) was born in 1932, the year of the Water Monkey, in the twelfth month, in the Powo region of Kham, East Tibet. He was recognized in 1936 by the Fifth Dzogchen Rinpoche (Thubten Chokyi Dorje) and Khenpo Ngawang Palzang (also known as Khenchen Ngagi Wangchuk, Ngawang Palzangpo, or Khenpo Ngagchung). Padma Norbu was formally enthroned by his root teacher, Thubten Chökyi Dawa (1894–1959) the second Chogtrul Rinpoche, and Karma Thegchog Nyingpo (1908–1958) the Fourth Karma Kuchen. He trained at the Palyul Monastery in Tibet, studying and receiving teachings from numerous masters and scholars, including the Fourth Karma Kuchen, the 10th Palyul throneholder.

=== Establishment in India ===
In 1959, recognizing the situation in Eastern Tibet to be very tense, Penor Rinpoche left with a party of 300 for Pemako in Northeast India. Only 30 of the original party survived. In 1961, they were resettled in South India in Bylakuppe in a series of Tibetan camps where Penor Rinpoche initially built a bamboo temple to train a small handful of monks in 1963.

=== Life in India ===
In the 1970s, Penor Rinpoche began to train Khenpos in the Nam Cho cycle. By the 1980s Namdroling Monastery had many hundreds of monks. In 1993, a nunnery was added, and by 2004 there were 4000 monks and 800 nuns at the monastic center.

=== Teachings in Western countries ===
He made his first visit to the United States in 1985, invited by Gyaltrul Rinpoche to Ashland, Oregon, to confer the Nam Cho cycle of teachings. In 1987 he recognized Alyce Zeoli as the incarnation of Genyenma Ahkön Lhamo. The historical Genyenma Ahkön Lhamo was the sister of the founder of Palyul, Kunzang Sherab.

In 1988 he gave the Kama teachings at Gyatrul Rinpoche's Yeshe Nyingpo center in Ashland, Oregon, followed immediately thereafter by the Longchen Nyingthig at Ven. Peling Tulku Rinpoche's centre in Canada, Orgyan Osal Cho Dzong. After this he gave the Rinchen Terzod empowerments at Kunzang Palyul Choling. Towards the end of this cycle of empowerments he ordained 25 western monks and nuns.

In 1995, was invited by John Giorno to give teachings and empowerments for a week in New York City. He then traveled to Kunzang Palyul Choling to give the Nam Chö cycle. After this trip, he sent Khenpo Tsewang Gyatso, who had previously taught in the U.S. in 1992, to establish centers in New York and other regions.

In 1998, he established the Palyul Retreat Center in McDonough, New York, offering a one-month retreat course that follows a similar if abbreviated curriculum to the one at Namdroling monastery. He offered Kalachakra empowerments, first in Rochester in 1996 and next at his retreat center in 2007. He also granted the Nam Chö cycle of teachings in Austin, Texas, in 2002.

=== Head of the Nyingma tradition ===
Within the Nyingma tradition, there was no centralized throneholder and no political aspirations. At the onset of the Tibetan diaspora, there was a request from the Tibetan Government in Exile to the Nyingma school to establish a representative, someone of the highest esteem who could represent the Nyingma tradition.

The 14th Dalai Lama proposed Dudjom Rinpoche as the tradition's in exile first representative. Subsequently, the later requests were usually made during the annual Nyingma Monlam Chenmo in Bodhgaya.

- Dudjom Jigdral Yeshe Dorje (c. 1904–1987), was unanimously requested to become the First Head of the Nyingma Tradition, and he served from c.1965 until his death.
- Dilgo Khyentse (c. 1910–1991) was requested to become the Second Head of the Nyingma Tradition, and he served from 1987 until his death.
- The 3rd Drubwang Padma Norbu, Penor Rinpoche (1932–2009) was requested to become the Third Head of the Nyingma Tradition, and he served from 1993 until retirement in 2003.
- Mindrolling Trichen Rinpoche (c. 1930–2008), was requested to become the Fourth Head of the Nyingma Tradition, and he served from 2003 until his death.
- Chatral Sangye Dorje was requested to become the Fifth Head of the Nyingma Tradition, but he declined.
- Trulshik Rinpoche (1923-2011) served as the Fifth Head of the Nyingma Tradition from 2010 until his death.
- Dodrupchen Rinpoche (1927-2022) was requested to become the Sixth Head of the Nyingmapas, but he declined.
- Taklung Tsetrul Rinpoche (1926-2015), served as the Sixth Head from 2012 until his death.
- Katok Getse Rinpoche (1954-2018) briefly served in the role of Seventh Head of the Nyingma Tradition. In January 2018, he accepted the role for a 3-year rotation period, but he died the following November before the completion of the term.
- Dzogchen Rinpoche (b. 1964) was asked to assume the role in 2019 for the agreed 3-year rotation period, but he declined.
- Shechen Rabjam Rinpoche was then asked to assume the role in 2019 for the agreed 3-year rotation period, but he also declined. He issued a statement to which everyone agreed that transferred the position's responsibilities to the revolving committee of the annual Nyingma Monlam Chenmo.

=== Activities ===
==== Monlam Chenmo ====
Each year a prayer festival called "Monlam Chenmo" is held in Bodh Gaya, the place of the Buddha's Enlightenment. Recognizing its importance, Penor Rinpoche headed a committee of monks, tulkus and khenpos who organized the yearly prayer ceremony.

==== South Indian Monastery ====
He was responsible for an ever-expanding population of Himalayan monks and nuns who come to Namdroling Monastery based on the traditional cultural style of sending a son or daughter to the monastery for an education. Many of the young monks and nuns come from extremely impoverished families located in Bhutan, Nepal or the Tibetan refugee camps in India. The monastery provides full room, board, clothing, medical care and an education in the traditional Tibetan Buddhist canon. The population of students exceeds several thousand.

==== South Indian local community ====
He sponsored the pavement of the road leading from Bylakuppe to Kushalnagar. He also built a small hospital that still requires equipment, but provides infirmary services to the local community. A side benefit of his activities is that the temples he built brings busloads of Indian tourists to the area daily, increasing the income and economic activity in the area.

==== Worldwide ====
His main U.S. representative is Khenchen Tsewang Gyatsho Rinpoche, who maintains a yearly travel schedule that includes Canada, Singapore as well as Arizona, California, Florida, Montana, New York, Ohio, Texas, Virginia, and Washington, DC.

Centers for practice are located internationally, including India, Taiwan, Hong Kong, and the United States.

==== Retreats ====
Monks and international students went on retreat with Penor Rinpoche and received teachings directly from him on two occasions per year. The first was in the 2nd month of the lunar calendar at Namdroling Monastery in South India. The second was in the United States at Palyul Ling. The retreats consisted of the teachings as structured within the Nam Chö cycle beginning with Ngondro, followed by the Inner Heat practice of Tsa Lung, and then Dzogchen Trekcho and Togyal.

== The Successive Incarnations of the Drubwang Padma Norbu Rinpoche ==
- The First Drubwang Padma Norbu Rinpoche (1679–1757, aged 79). He was the 3rd Throne Holder of the Palyul Tradition.
- The Second Drubwang Padma Norbu Rinpoche, Padma Kunzang Tanzin Norbu also known as Thubtan Chokyi Langpo, also known as Rigzin Palchen Dupa (1887–1932, aged 46). He was the 9th Throne Holder of the Palyul Tradition.
- The Third Drubwang Padma Norbu Rinpoche, Thubten Legshed Chokyi Drayang also known as Do-ngag Shadrub Tanzin Chog-las Namgyal (1933–2009, aged 77). He was the 11th Throne Holder of the Palyul Tradition.
- Penor Rinpoche Yangsi: The Fourth Drubwang Padma Norbu Rinpoche, Mingyur Dechen Garwang Zilnon Dorje of Tibet. Enthroned on 31 July 2014.

== Palyul lineage ==
The Palyul lineage was founded in 1665 by Kunzang Sherab (1636–1699). It is based out of Palyul Monastery, one of the "Six Mother Monasteries" of the Nyingma lineage whose Palyul branch monasteries numbered more than 400 before China invaded Tibet. The primary teachings followed by Palyul Monasteries were revealed by Mingyur Dorje, a Terton. Other terton's revelations studied by Palyul included those by Karme Lingpa, Jigme Lingpa, Ratna Lingpa, Dorje Lingpa, and Jamgon Kongtrul Lodro Taye. These and others formed Palyul's "canonical and revealed texts, the sūtra, tantra and mind-specific treatises (mdo rgyud sems gsum), and the instructional cycle of Dzogchen such as the Heart Essence (snying thig)."

The Namchö Mingyur Dorje have been passed down from teacher to disciple as the "Space Treasure" cycle of teachings. Among these canonical treatises were the teachings from which HH Penor Rinpoche transmitted and taught his students, along with texts from the Treasury of Revelations (rin chen gter mdzod) cycle.

In 2000, Penor Rinpoche designated his successor, and requested the Fifth Karma Kuchen Rinpoche as his successor, to establish his seat at Palyul Monastery in Tibet. The Fifth Karma Kuchen is 12th and current Palyul throne holder.

In 2003, Penor Rinpoche retired from his ten-year position as the 3rd Head of the Nyingma Tradition, and the position of 4th Head of the Nyingma Tradition was offered to Mindrolling Trichen Rinpoche, who accepted.

In 2005, Penor Rinpoche began to have health issues but continued to oversee projects, to travel and teach in Asia and America, and to build. By 24 March 2009, he was admitted to the hospital in Bengaluru. A massive Long Life puja was held on 27 March, the same day that Penor Rinpoche was able to leave the hospital and return to Namdroling while attending a few brief meetings. That night at around 21:30 Indian Standard Time at his residence at the Namdroling Monastery, Penor Rinpoche passed into the meditative state of tukdam where he remained for a week before his demise on 3 April 2009.

== Monasteries ==
=== Palyul Monastery ===
Palyul's Khenpo the 4th Karma Kuchen was detained by China's forces in 1957, and later died from torture in 1958, before Penor Rinpoche escaped in 1959. After Palyul Monastery and its 400 branches were destroyed by China's forces in the late 1950s, Palyul Monastery was rebuilt in India by Penor Rinpoche, beginning in the late 1970s. By 1983, pujas were again being performed at Palyul's main monastery, when Penor Rinpoche gave "teachings, initiations, and monastic ordinations". The main temple was re-inaugurated in 2006 by HH Penor Rinpoche's schoolmate, Tulku Thubsang Rinpoche.

=== Namdroling Monastery ===
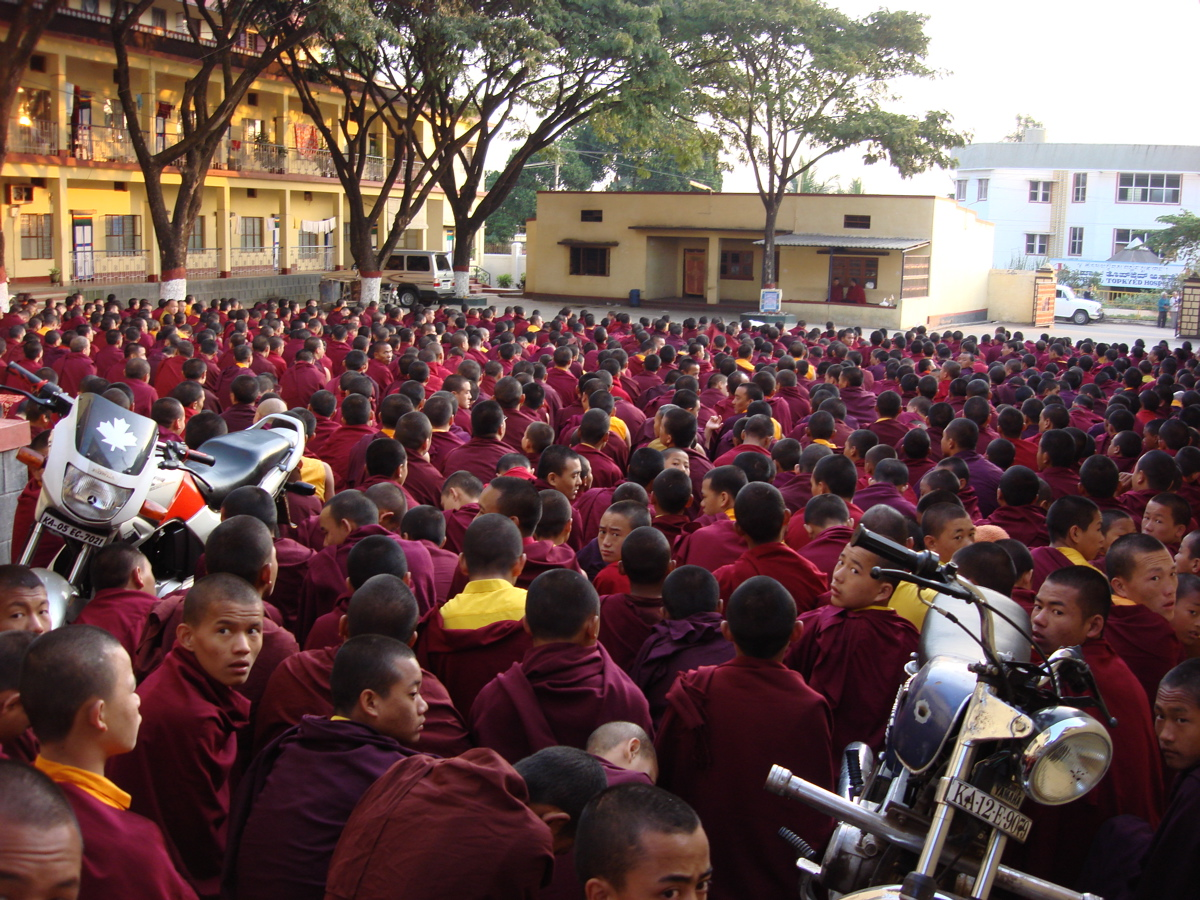
The monks of Namdroling Monastery in 2006.

In order to protect the Palyul tradition in exile, Penor Rinpoche's Vajra Seat in India is formally called the Tekchok Namdrol Shedrub Dargye Ling, which may be loosely translated as "Institute for Preservation and Dissemination of the Liberating Teachings and Practices of the Higher Tradition." Its informally known as Namdroling Monastery, located in Karnataka, where the Ngagyur Nyingma Institute is located. The Institute's monastic college was founded in 1978 and is called the Dongak Rikpai Jungne Ling (mdo sngags rig pa'i 'byung gnas gling), while the Tsogyel Shedrub Dargye Ling (mtsho rgyal bshad grub dar rgyas gling) nunnery opened in 1993. There are a couple of practice centers - the Ngagyur Samten Wosel Ling (snga 'gyur bsam gtan 'od gsal gling/sgrub sde khang) built in 1985, and the Namdak Trimkhang Ling (rnam dag khrims khang gling). The leadership at Namdroling Monastery also oversees a junior school, the Yeshe Wosel Sherab Reltri Ling (ye shes 'od gsal shes rab ral gri gling), while in 1975 a residence for elderly people, the Geso Khang (rgas gso khang) was also built. The community hospital was built in 2003.

At Namdroling's campus, hundreds of monks and nuns study and graduate from a ten-year shedra program which includes a three-year retreat afterwards. The three senior Khenpos (equal to professors of Buddhist philosophy) include Khenchen Pema Sherab Rinpoche, Khenchen Namdrol Rinpoche, and Khenchen Tsewang Gyatsho Rinpoche who oversee the education of the thousands of monks and nuns enrolled in study at the shedra Buddhist college.

=== Palyul Monasteries in North India ===
A Palyul monastery was reestablished in exile in Bir Tibetan Colony, India, by Penor Rinpoche's close friend, Dzongnang Rinpoche. Its current abbot is Rigo Tulku Rinpoche.

=== Other Palyul Monasteries ===
There are many small branch monasteries throughout Tibet. There are also dharma centers across the globe including Canada, England, Germany, Hong Kong, India, Macau, Taiwan, Singapore, Philippines, and the United States that were founded under HH Penor Rinpoche's guidance.

== Prominent students ==
Penor Rinpoche's students include his "heart sons" the Fifth Karma Kuchen (successor to the Palyul throne), Khentul Gyangkhang Rinpoche, and Mugsang Kuchen Rinpoche. Other prominent students include Jetsunma Ahkon Lhamo, Ngawang Jigdral Rinpoche, Sakyong Mipham Rinpoche, Khentrul Lodro Thaye Rinpoche, Minling Khenchen Rinpoche and many others. The three most senior Khenpos from Namdroling Monastery are Khenchens Pema Sherab, Tsewang Gyatso, and Namdrol Tsering.

== Bibliography ==
- Tsering Lama Jampal Zangpo (1988), A Garland of Immortal Wish-Fulfilling Trees, Ithaca, NY: Snow Lion Publications. ISBN 0-937938-64-5, ISBN 978-0-937938-64-5
- Nyoshul Khen Rinpoche (2005), "A Marvelous Garland of Rare Gems: Biographies of Masters of Awareness in the Dzogchen Lineage", Junction City, CA: Padma Publishing. ISBN 978-1-881847-41-0
