= Orgyen Kusum Lingpa =

Tibetan Buddhist terton (1934–2009)

Orgyen Kusum Lingpa (1934–2009) was a Tibetan terton and Nyingma lineage holder within Tibetan Buddhism. His name means "Holder of the Sanctuary of the Trikaya of Oddiyana Padmasambhava."

== History ==
Kusum Lingpa was born in 1934 in the Golog region of Amdo province in eastern Tibet as the son of the well-known yogi Lhundrup Gyamtso of the Waxi (Wal Shul) clan. At that time he was known as Pema Tumpo, or Pema Tum Drag Dorje. His father's brother, Waxi Lama Sonam Khedrup, was also a famous Buddhist teacher in the region.

Mingyur Namkhé Dorje, 4th Dzogchen Rinpoche, prophesied about Orgyen Kusum Lingpa:

An emanation of Vajrapani will appear in the year known as "guarding wealth" in the Achag Dri region [of Golog] as a child named Tum Drag... He will blossom like a lily, and then unleash himself like a thunderstorm... He will guide all those connected with him to Sikhavati, The Realm of Bliss.

Orgyen Kusum Lingpa's previous incarnations include the Mahasiddha Drilbupa in India and Lhalung Pelgyi Dorje, the heart disciple of Guru Rinpoche Padma Sambhava in Tibet, who assassinated the anti-Buddhist Bon Emperor Langdarma in 842 CE and then hid in the Moon Cave of the Drag Yerpa retreat outside Lhasa. Orgyen Kusum Lingpa also often claimed to recall his previous life as the crazy wisdom master Drugpa Kunleg, and enjoyed recounting the latter's exploits given any occasion.

As a youth, he studied primarily at Darthang Monastery in Golog, where his teachers included Payul Chogtrul Rinpoche Jampal Jaypa'i Dorje (Chokyi Dawa), Akong Khenchen Lobsang Dorje, and Gyedro Wonpo Rinpoche. There he received instructions and empowerments alongside Drubwang Penor Rinpoche, among others. Another of his principal teachers was the 4th Dodrupchen Rinpoche Tubpa Zangpo, from whom he received the complete transmissions of the Longchen Nyingthig lineage, of which he became a holder.

Orgyen Kusum Lingpa began to discover mind treasures of teachings of Guru Rinpoche after his mother died and he went on pilgrimage to central Tibet when he was 16 years old. On his journey he first passed through Derge and reached Kojo, where he met Ratri Terton Nyagla Changchub Dorje, then reputedly aged 113, who became his principal teacher of Dzog Chen nature of mind instructions.

Proceeding to Lhasa and remaining there throughout most of the 1950s, Orgyen Kusum Lingpa met and received empowerments and instructions from great holders of all of the major dharma lineages of Tibet, including the 16th Karmapa Rigpa'i Dorje, Sera Khenchen Jamyang Choklay Namgyal, the 14th Dalai Lama, Sakya Ngagchang Rinpoche, Dudjom Rinpoche, Jamyang Khyentse Chokyi Lodro, Dilgo Khyentse, Taklung Ma Rinpoche, and many others; which instructions he then put into practice. With the loss of Tibetan autonomy and during the period of the Cultural Revolution, he was subsequently imprisoned on and off over the course of more than 20 years of his adult life.

Eventually he was permitted to re-establish an encampment, and then a monastery, in the Ga De cantonment of Golog, along a bend of a tributary of the Ma Chu (Yellow River). The monastery originally was founded by the 19th century Master Do Khyentse Yeshe Dorje, and then passed down through a succession of holders within the Waxi family lineage. This monastery is known as Lung Ngon Thubten Chokhorling, or "Blue Valley Sanctuary of the Dharma Wheel of the Muni's Teachings."

When he was still young Orgyen Kusum Lingpa fathered a son named Nyima Gyal, who has become a well-known ritual master in Golog and presently resides at Sang Lung Monastery. With his lifelong consort Dug Kar Drolma, the sister of Garwang Nyima Rinpoche (the current head of Darthang Monastery), he later had two sons and two daughters.

He died on Feb 26th, 2009 at his monastery in Guoluo Tibetan Autonomous Prefecture.

The XIVth Dalai Lama composed this short prayer for the swift rebirth of Orgyen Kusum Lingpa shortly thereafter in 2009:

Supreme Muni, our Supreme Leader, Lord of Oddiyana and your children, the Arya assembly—all you sources of refuge, please approach, bear witness to this aspiration prayer, give heedto our yearning and lamentation, and grant your great blessings!

May there swiftly appear a reincarnation of our kind Guru who was so skilled at guiding transient beings to the jewel Island of the Three Kayas of enlightenment, by freely revealing the profound meaning of the Mind Treasures of the Victor Orgyen.

Highly dignified and very Fierce, Wrathful potentates who abide within the most secret command and samaya of Padma, Varja dharma guardians, bring about the purpose of this aspiration through the inveterate support of your enlightened activity!"

(Translated from Tibetan)

== Teachings and students ==
During the latter period of his life, Orgyen Kusum Lingpa was invited to visit and teach in many different countries. He was first invited to the United States by Chagdud Tulku of Chagdud Gonpa Foundation and by Gyaltrul Rinpoche in 1994. During his first several extended visits to the U.S. in 1994 and 1995, he met and gave Buddhist teachings to a number of celebrities and scholars, including the film director Oliver Stone, and actor Steven Seagal, and was welcomed at Tibetan Buddhist centers across the country. His early translators were Erik Drew and Richard Barron (Chokyi Nyima). Several of the attendant Lamas who accompanied him from Golog eventually settled in the U.S., including Lama Chonam and Lama Lhanang in California. His two youngest sons, Tulku Hungkar Dorje and Tulku Dorje Trengpo, also often accompanied him on those early visits.

Beginning in 1995, to fulfill a prophecy he received from the deity Vajrapani to establish 108 practice centers of Vajra Kilaya in order to avert coming calamities and wars in the world, Orgyen Kusum Lingpa established the dharma center Orgyen Khachod Ling in Los Angeles.

Orgyen Kusum Lingpa also maintained a close connection with the Tibetan Lama Chodrak Gyatso Nubpa of the Thondup Ling dharma center in the Los Angeles area, entrusting him with the treasure cycle of the deity Orgyen Jambhala and recognizing his son Rigdzin as a rebirth of a past master named Gyarong Tergod, sending him to train at Dodrupchen's monastery in Sikkim, India.

While most of Kusum Lingpa's original and early American disciples had previously studied with other Tibetan Buddhist Lamas, gradually he began to gather a great number of Vietnamese American disciples for whom Tibetan Buddhism was relatively new. He also traveled to Vietnam several times.

His teachings received directly from guru Rinpoche Padmasambhava comprises mainly a cycle known as the Pema Nyingthig, "The Heart Essence of Padma." These and his other teachings have been partially published in the Tibetan language in a collection of 18 volumes, with several volumes still to be added. . Orgyen Kusum Lingpa consistently referred to himself as one of the 1000 or more 'servant treasure revealers' who follow the 108 great treasure revealers, the last of whom was Orgyen Chokgyur Lingpa in the 19th century.

The principal Guru sadhana cycles he discovered were of Guru Rinpoche in the form of Vidyadhara Acarya Padma with a mandala of the eight great vidyadharas of the Ka Gye lineages of India and Tibet; and the Rigden King, Wrathful Holder of the Iron Wheel. His many Yidam sadhana cycles feature Hayagriva, Tara, Vajrapani, Yamantaka and Jambhala. His Dakini cycles include extensive sadhanas of Yeshe Tsogyal and Mandarava. His primary treasure of the Compassionate One (Tug Je Chenpo) Avalokitesvara is in the form of Don Yod Shakpa (Amoghapasa).

The treasures also include collected prophecies, medical treatises, and songs of realization. The principle scribes of his dictated mind treasures included his sons Tulku Hungkar Dorje and Tulku Dorje Trengpo, and his long-time attendant and disciple, the Umdze (chantmaster) Chozang.

== Successor ==
Orgyen Kusum Lingpa's son Tulku Hungkar Dorje is his recognized successor. Hungkar Dorje was born in 1969 and recognized early in his life by such Buddhist masters as Orgyen Kusum Lingpa, Dodrupchen Rinpoche, Penor Rinpoche, and later by the Dalai Lama, as a reincarnation of Do Khyentse Yeshe Dorje, the mind emanation of the great Nyingma Dzogchen Master Jigme Lingpa.

He completed his early education in Buddhist Philosophy with his father Orgyen Kusum Lingpa, Dodrupchen, Penor Rinpoche, and Akong Khenpo. From 1990 to 1994 he studied towards a Geshe degree at Drepung Monastery in India.

Since 1994, he has served as the official abbot of Lung Ngon Thubten Chokhorling Monastery in the Gande region of Golok Tibetan Autonomous Prefecture, Qinghai Province, China. As president of the Mayul (Qinghai) Gesar Foundation for Virtuous Activity, a charity run by Tibetans in Golog, he has helped design and overseen construction of the Great Stupa for World Peace, one of the largest stupas in the world. He founded the Dharma Institute, a nine-year advanced Buddhist training program for lay people. In 2005, he founded the first Buddhist nunnery in Golok. He has also recently established a vocational school for Tibetans.
