= Yangthang Rinpoche =

Tibetan Lama

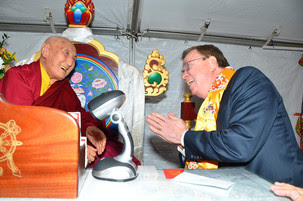
- Yangthang Tulku Rinpoche and Mansfield Kaseman Interfaith Community Liaison, Montgomery County Office of Community Partnership
- Title: Domang Yangtrul

Personal life
- Born: January 10, 1930 Yangthang, Western Sikkim, India
- Died: October 15, 2016 (aged 86) Hyderabad, India
- Parents: པདྨ་འགྲོ་འདུལ། Padma 'Dro-'dul (father); བསྟན་འཛིན་ཆོས་སྒྲོན། Bstan-'zin-Chos-sgron (mother)

Religious life
- Religion: Buddhism
- School: Nyingma
- Lineage: Palyul
- Dharma name: ཀུན་བཟང་འཇིགས་མེད་བདེ་ཆེན་འོད་གསལ་རྡོ་རྗེ། Kunzang Jigmed Dechen Ösal Dorje

Senior posting
- Reincarnation: Terton Dorje Dechen Lingpa and Lhatsun Namkha Jigmed

Yangthang Rinpoche or Kyabje Domang Yangthang Rinpoche (Tib. མདོ་མང་གཡང་ཐང་རིན་པོ་ཆེ།, Wyl. mdo mang g.yang thang rin po che) or Kunzang Jigmed Dechen Ösal Dorje (Tibetan calendar: 16th Rabjyung, Sa abrul, 10th of 11th month-17th Rabjyung, Me sprel, 14th of 8th month) (1930–2016) was a renowned Nyingma teacher from the region of Yangthang who was associated with Domang Monastery, a branch of Palyul in Eastern Tibet.

Yangthang Rinpoche was a lineage holder of the Nyingthig Yabshi, which combines all the major Dzogchen schools. However, he was most well known for deliberately staying in Tibet after its takeover by China in order to teach in the prisons. He lived for 22 years in Chinese prisons, teaching both the Tibetan prisoners and the Chinese guards. He was released following the death of Mao Zedong.

After his release under Deng Xiaoping's reforms, Yangthang Rinpoche traveled throughout Europe, Asia, and the US, to give teachings and esoteric transmissions. During his 2013 visit, his story inspired officials in Montgomery County, Maryland, to officially name April 23 "Yangthang Tulku Day." He died in Hyderabad in 2016. His life and activities are recounted in the documentary film, Domang Yangthang by Rayonner Films.
