= Bylakuppe =

Village in Mysore district, Karnataka, India

- Village
- Zangdok Palri Temple in Namdroling Monastery

- Location within Karnataka Location within India
- Coordinates: 12°25′56″N 75°59′41″E
- Country: India
- State: Karnataka
- District: Mysore
- Taluk: Periyapatna
- Elevation: 866 m (2,841 ft)

Population (2011)
  - Total: 70,000+ (1,858 citizens) (Note: The 2011 census of India only recorded an official population of 1,858 citizens, but there are 70,000 Tibetan refugees living in and around Bylakuppe.)
- Time zone: UTC+5:30 (IST)
- PIN: 571104
- Telephone code: +91 8223
- Vehicle registration: KA-45

Bylakuppe is a village in Periyapatna taluk, Mysore district, Karnataka, India. While the 2011 census of India recorded an official population of 1,858 citizens, there are also around 70,000 Tibetan refugees living in and around Bylakuppe. Bylakuppe is the second-largest Tibetan settlement outside of China, after Dharmashala in Himachal Pradesh.

The most notable attraction in Bylakuppe is Namdroling Monastery, also known as the "Golden Temple", which features 60-foot-tall statues of the Buddha, Amitāyus, and Padmasambhava.

== History ==
Bylakuppe was established by Tibetan refugees who had fled from China after the failed 1959 Tibetan uprising. The Indian government provided the Tibetans with 3,000 acres (12 km^{2}) of land and the settlement eventually grew into an officially recognised taluk (subdistrict, township).

== Administration ==
Bylakuppe is located in the taluk of Piriyapatna, which is part of the district of Mysore, in the state of Karnataka. Per the Constitution of India, Bylakuppe elects a sarpanch to lead the village government.

== Demographics ==
The 2011 census of India recorded 1,858 citizens – 938 males and 920 females – living in 473 households in Bylakuppe. Among them were 216 children, 173 people belonging to a Scheduled Caste, and 69 people belonging to a Scheduled Tribe. The literacy rate was 66.75%, with a higher rate among males at 72.22% compared to females at 61.18%. There were 755 workers, mostly men.

In addition, there are roughly 70,000 Tibetan refugees living in and around Bylakuppe. Also known as "Mini Tibet", Bylakuppe has the second largest number of Tibetans outside of China, after Dharmashala in Himachal Pradesh.

== Economy ==
Agriculture and tourism are the main economic activities in Bylakuppe. Locals sell Tibetan souvenirs such as traditional carpets, clothing, and trinkets.

== Transportation ==
An auto stand in Bylakuppe

Bylakuppe is accessible only by road. There are state-run and private bus services to Bylakuppe from numerous cities and towns in Karnataka. The closest railway station is Mysore Junction some 85 kilometres away, and the closest international airport is Kempegowda International Airport in Bengaluru some 260 kilometres away.

== Monasteries ==
Namdroling Monastery, also known as the "Golden Temple", is the main Tibetan Buddhist monastery and tourist attraction in Bylakuppe. It features 60-foot-tall statues of the Buddha, Amitāyus, and Padmasambhava. The interior walls are decorated with murals depicting stories from Tibetan mythology. Other monasteries include Namdroling, Sera Jey, and Tashi Lhunpo, the latter two taking their names from the original monasteries in Tibet.

Side view of Zangdok Palri Temple in Namdroling Monastery

Stupa of Penor Rinpoche inside Namdroling Monastery

Sera Jey Monastery

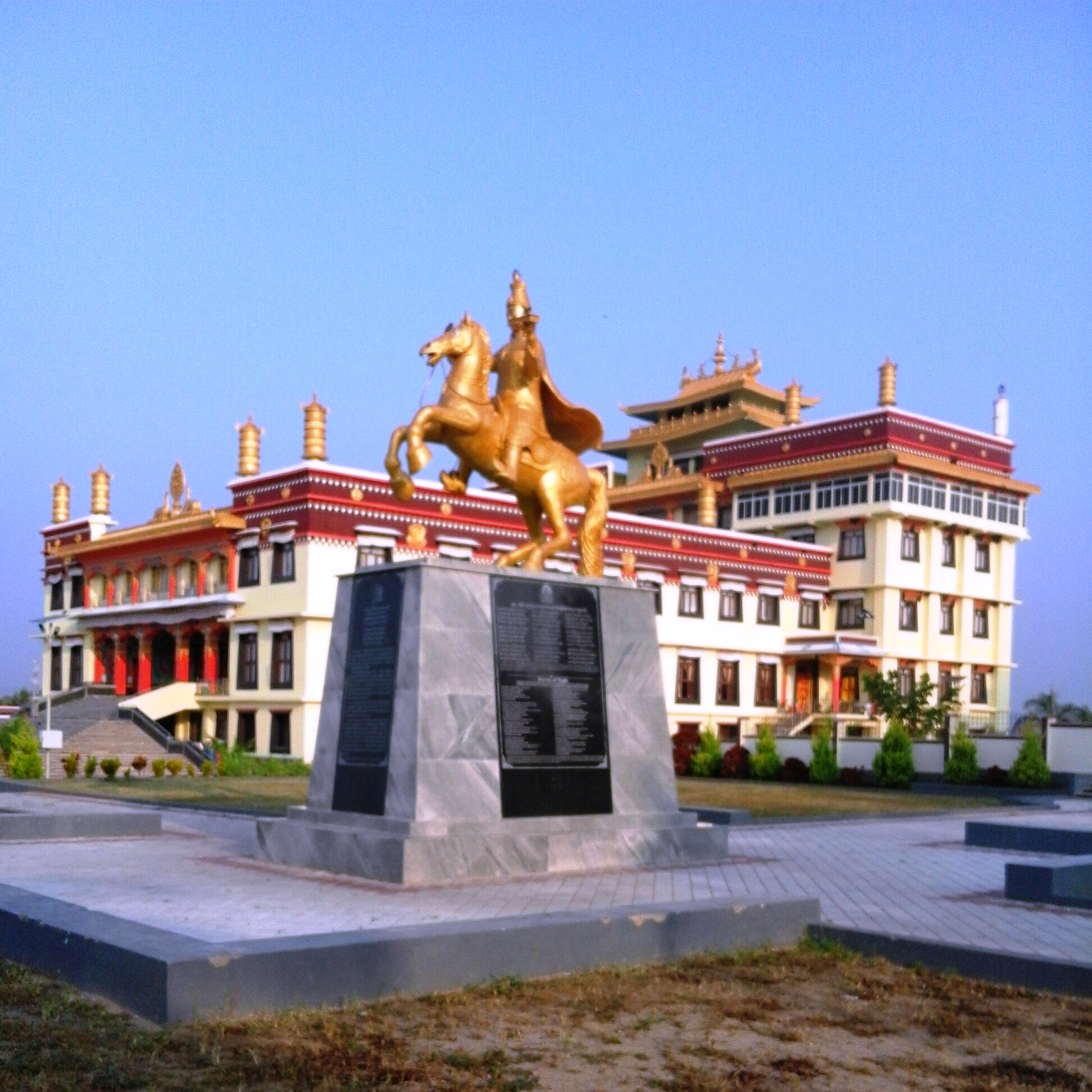
Tashi Lhunpo Monastery

== Climate ==
The Köppen-Geiger climate classification system classifies the climate in Bylakuppe as tropical wet and dry (Aw).

Climate data for Bylakuppe at 866 metres (2,841 ft)
| Month | Jan | Feb | Mar | Apr | May | Jun | Jul | Aug | Sep | Oct | Nov | Dec | Year |
|---|---|---|---|---|---|---|---|---|---|---|---|---|---|
| Mean daily maximum °C (°F) | 27.7 (81.9) | 29.8 (85.6) | 31.8 (89.2) | 31.5 (88.7) | 29.2 (84.6) | 25.1 (77.2) | 24 (75) | 24.3 (75.7) | 25.6 (78.1) | 26 (79) | 25.6 (78.1) | 26 (79) | 27.2 (81.0) |
| Daily mean °C (°F) | 21 (70) | 22.8 (73.0) | 24.8 (76.6) | 25.1 (77.2) | 23.9 (75.0) | 21.8 (71.2) | 21.1 (70.0) | 21.1 (70.0) | 21.6 (70.9) | 21.6 (70.9) | 21.1 (70.0) | 20.4 (68.7) | 22.2 (72.0) |
| Mean daily minimum °C (°F) | 14.5 (58.1) | 16.2 (61.2) | 18.8 (65.8) | 20.6 (69.1) | 20.6 (69.1) | 20 (68) | 19.5 (67.1) | 19.3 (66.7) | 19.1 (66.4) | 18.4 (65.1) | 16.7 (62.1) | 15 (59) | 18.2 (64.8) |
| Average precipitation mm (inches) | 5 (0.2) | 6 (0.2) | 15 (0.6) | 52 (2.0) | 109 (4.3) | 213 (8.4) | 243 (9.6) | 177 (7.0) | 118 (4.6) | 157 (6.2) | 62 (2.4) | 19 (0.7) | 1,176 (46.2) |
| Average rainy days | 1 | 1 | 2 | 7 | 14 | 19 | 20 | 18 | 14 | 14 | 7 | 3 | 120 |
| Average relative humidity (%) | 57 | 51 | 54 | 68 | 78 | 87 | 89 | 88 | 85 | 83 | 75 | 64 | 73 |
| Mean daily sunshine hours | 9 | 9.5 | 9.8 | 9.3 | 8.1 | 5.8 | 5.6 | 5.5 | 6.1 | 6.5 | 6.9 | 7.7 | 7.5 |
Source: Climate-Data.org (altitude: 866 m)
