= Karma in Tibetan Buddhism =

Karma in Tibetan Buddhism is one of the central issues addressed in Eastern philosophy, and an important part of its general practice.

Karma is the causality principle focusing on three concepts: causes, actions, and effects; it is the mind's phenomena that guide the actions that the actor performs. Buddhism trains the actor's actions for continued and uncontrived virtuous outcomes aimed at reducing suffering. This follows the Subject–verb–object structure.

== Overview ==
In Tibetan Buddhism, karma is created by physical actions, speech, and even thoughts. There is no concept of good nor bad karma—simply karma. Tibetan Buddhism teaches that every creature has transmigrated helplessly since beginningless time under the influence of ignorance and that their lack of understanding has led to performance of actions that have created connections with cyclic existence. To break this pattern, one must reorient their thinking to accord with reality. Tibetan Buddhism draws on the current human intellect for problem-solving as opposed to a higher deity or power.

Karma literally means "action," but it refers to action in a comprehensive way that includes thoughts, words, and deeds. Furthermore, it includes all the effects of these various kinds of action, both the immediate and visible effects and the long-term and invisible effects. Karma is the force that connects all the moments of life to each other and all things to each other.

In terms of a person's own motivations and aspirations, the issue of others' karmic results is scarcely relevant. The importance is his or her own intention. Karma is a dependent entity-—one whose forces are a direct result of one’s thoughts, actions, and words. According to Tibetan Buddhism, the Buddha taught that one’s present life is only one in a beginningless series of incarnations, and each of these is determined by one’s actions in previous lives. Tibetan Buddhist philosophy believes that we are born again after we die, and subsequently, the karma we create in past lives is carried into our next. The Tibetan Buddhist concept of karma is similar to Newton’s third law of motion, which holds that for every action there is a concordant reaction. This is presented as a universal law that has nothing to do with abstract ideas of justice, reward, or punishment. Karma, whether one is aware of it or not, is constantly being created. Tibetan Buddhism teaches that karma can have immediate reactions, or reactions may come later in life, in a future life, or in the bardo interval between lives, which creates the basis for the form in which the next life will take. By understanding the ball-and-chain relationship between karma and the individual, one can better understand Tibetan Buddhism as a whole.

== Gelugpa - Tsongkhapa ==
Tsongkhapa (1357–1419), the founder of the Gelug school of Tibetan Buddhism, argued that the Prāsaṅgika position allowed for the postulation of something called an "act's cessation" (las zhig pal) which persists and is, in fact, a substance (rdzas or dngos po, S. vastu), and which explains the connection between cause and result. Gorampa, an important philosopher of the Sakya school of Tibetan Buddhism, accused Tsongkhapa of a doctrinal innovation not legitimately grounded in Candrakīrti's work, and one which amounted to little more than a (non-Buddhist) Vaiśeṣika concept. Gelugpa scholars offered defenses of the idea.

== Nyingma ==
In the Nyingma school (originating around 760), karma can be taught at the third of four thoughts that turn the mind to dharma in the outer preliminaries. It is taught within the pre-liminary practices of the Longchen Nyingthig, "The Heart-essence of the Vast Expanse". This is a terma or "spiritual discovery", a hidden teaching from Padmasambhava which was revealed by Jigme Lingpa (1729–1798). It is one of the most widely practiced teachings in the Nyingmapa school. The Heart-essence of the Vast Expanse teaching cycle has the following structure:

- Pre-liminary practices (sngon 'gro):
  - Outer or external preliminaries:
    - the freedoms and advantages of precious human rebirth;
    - the truth of impermanence and change;
    - the workings of karma; (Note: karma as actions: Paltrul Rinpoche explains karma as actions: the cause and effect principle, which encompasses the whole process: cause, conditions, effect as action. Within this he means that his teacher’s mind is not beyond samsara, but is a perfect example to disciples on actions to follow the path in progression of vehicles;)
    - the suffering of living beings within samsara
  - Inner preliminaries: taking refuge, arousing bodhicitta, Vajrasattva, mandala offering, and Guru Yoga (Note: Guru Yoga: Kenpo Ngawang Pelzang’s Guru Yoga practice explanation offers a karma purification practice where the student first visualizes the merit field, performs the seven-branch offerings, prays with resolute trust, and takes the four empowerments with the teacher. The seven branches offering actions each have associated antidotes to poisons: 1. Prostration for pride; 2. Offering for attachment; 3. Confession for aversion; 4. Rejoicing for jealously; 5. Exhorting Buddhas to turn dharma wheel for ignorance; 6. Requesting Buddha not to enter nirvana for wrong views; 7. Dedication for uncertainty.; Patrul Rinpoche gives a further explanation on confession, which may include all moral downfalls and harmful deeds, all unmentionable things, ten negative actions of body speech and mind, five crimes with immediate retribution, five crimes which are almost as grave, the four serious faults, eight perverse acts, and abusing the three jewels funds. The five crimes with immediate retribution are: 1. killing one’s father or; 2. one’s mother or; 3. and Arhat; 4. creating a split in the Sangha; 5. malevolent causing a Buddha to bleed.; The five crimes which are almost as grave are: 1. acting impurely with a female Arhat; 2. killing a Bodhisattva; 3. killing someone training toward the supreme level; 4. stealing the Sangha’s sustenance; 5. destroying a stupa.; The eight perverse acts are: 1. criticizing good, 2. praising evil, 3. interrupting the accumulation of merit of a virtuous person, 4. disturbing the minds of those who have devotion, 5. giving up one’s vajra brothers and sisters, 6. desecrating a mandala.)
- Main practice (dngos gzhi): generation phase, perfection phase, and the Great Perfection (Note: Transference: Khenpo Ngawang Pelzang explains the swift transference practice action within great perfection, as a main practice branch. When awareness is vulnerable to circumstances, this belongs to the generation and perfection phase, with five transference methods. Whereas, transference is unnecessary for someone with impregnable and perfectly stable awareness, who then must still meditate on the visualizations and transference practice itself. These are "buddhahood without meditation" instructions.)

=== Jigme Lingpa ===
In Jigme Lingpa's Mindfulness Application: Unique Great Perfection Preliminary Instructions, karma arises to produce samsara, which should be abandoned. All the ten virtues and non-virtues will give results similar to the cause and can proliferate. With this understanding, cultivating a stable mind can avoid non-virtuous acts and appreciation for virtuous acts.

=== Patrul Rinpoche ===
Patrul Rinpoche wrote down Jigme Lingpa's pre-liminary practices from his teacher Jikmé Gyalwé Nyugu. These were translated into a book called The Words of My Perfect Teacher. (Note: Perfect Teacher: Jigme Gyalwai Nyugu, who received the teaching from Jigme Lingpa, was Paltrul Rinpoche’s Perfect Teacher. Paltrul Rinpoche is considered to be Jigme Lingpa's speech emanation.) It describes ten negative actions which are to be avoided, (Note: Ten actions to be avoided: 1. Taking life; 2. Taking what is not given; 3. Sexual misconduct; 4. Lying; 5. Sowing discord; 6. Harsh speech; 7. Worthless chatter; 8. Covetous; 9. Wishing harm on others; 10. Wrong views.) and positive actions to be adopted. According to Patrul Rinpoche, each negative act produces four kinds of karmic effects:

1. The fully ripened effect: rebirth in one of the lower realms of samsara;
2. The effect similar to the cause: rebirth in a human form, in which we have a predisposition for the same negative actions, or undergo the same negative actions being afflicted on us;
3. The conditioning effect: the negative act shapes our environment;
4. The proliferating effect: a continuous repetition of former negative actions, which keeps us wandering endlessly in samsara. Positive actions comprise the vow never to commit any of the negative actions. According to Patrul Rinpoche, the quality of our actions determine all the pleasures and miseries that an individual experiences.

=== Khenpo Ngawang Pelzang ===
Khenpo Ngawang Pelzang, a qualified Longchen Nyingthig commentator, explained harmful karma’s remedy is to first meet the spiritual friend, then listen to teachings and reflect on them. When karmic obstacles arise, the student may generate confidence in karmic laws; regret past actions and the student may apply other appropriate remedies. Continuing harmful karma may lead to lower rebirth. Lessening past results with meritorious activity results in higher rebirths. Students achieving pure karma will be welcomed to go directly to liberation in any instant. Since harmful actions are rooted in negative emotions and these are rooted in the self-belief, some realize no-self to believe and then end both karma and the emotions. Students may then attain the Arhat’s nirvana result, with and without residue, similar to the no more learning path. Bodhisattvas may pray for all karma to ripen upon them to purify its effect most beneficially for the student.

=== Chagdud Tulku Rinpoche ===
Chagdud Tulku Rinpoche’s student Jane Tromge compiled his Dudjom Tersar Ngondro teachings from Dudjom Lingpa’s terma revelation. Karma weaves experienced patterns as the inevitable results from outflowing causes. Understanding karma and purifications can establish a spiritual compass to direct conduct in positive accord until enlightenment’s threshold. An enlightened Buddha has passed beyond karmic dualism to an infinite reflecting radiance awakening. Karma is created in the mind source, with speech and body following the mind’s lead. Buddhist ten non-virtues and ten virtues delineate what to abandon and accept. Proliferating virtuous actions carries repetitions forward into future lifetimes.

=== Dzonsar Jamyag Khentse ===
Dzonsar Jamyag Khentse’s Longchen Nyingthig commentary explains that forgetting about death and karma is shown when we complain about everyone else. The sutras say Mara's third arrow is directed to those with wrong views, such as not believing in cause condition and effect (karma). (Note: Mara's arrow: Dzonsar Jamyag Khentse is referring to Jamgon Kongtrul Lodro Taya writings and "taming the mind" from Kongtrul Rinpoche's reference) Protection may be achieved with discipline, meditation, and wisdom. Exhausting karma leads to enlightenment and it's impossible to be independent and in control of anything having so many causes. Scientific people may believe in karma and not in reincarnation as its effects from virtue and non-virtue. This may corrode the ultimate truth beliefs in an interdependent reality, shunyata, and the triple gem, which request Buddhas and Bodhisattvas to not pass into Parinirvana. Karma is synonymous with reincarnation. Karmic debts pass from each lifetime. Merit produces good karma.

=== Khenpo Tenzin Norgay ===
Khenpo Tenzin Norgay's Nam Cho Ngöndro (preliminary practice) teachings emphasize karma purification importance in relation to proceeding to Dzogchen practices. There are 10 Steps in Ngöndro to quick enlightenment and karma is at Step 3. Karma follows the mind's wandering in samsara and may propel to the six realms. Only the student can purge and manage conduct and outcomes. Advancing to Dzogchen and skipping Ngöndro practices could lead to wrong karma views, where avoiding karma causes dangerous nihilistic (bodhicitta voided) views, the antidotes may become poisons. For example, the Heart Sutra, which explains no suffering, no cause of suffering, no path and no fruition could lead to a paradox asking why even practice. Understanding karma in the Ngöndro context helps answer the paradox. Karma is in the foundation for all Buddhist practices and requires both logic and faith for acceptance. Karma necessitates accepting beyond what the senses can materially perceive. Karmic law is not legislated, it is buddha nature and unavoidable. It is a way of expressing how the mind functions and can be trained. The Abhidharma explains karma in detail as karma is seen in the four noble truths. Dharma works out in nondiscrimination for everyone when there are shared karmic beliefs.

=== Khenpo Tsultrim Lodro ===
Khenpo Tsultrim Lodro interprets karma to mean cause, whenever karma is committed the seed will be planted in the alaya consciousness and the effect ripens. There are four types of ripening; the first ripes in this lifetime. While the other three types may ripen in the next lifetime. Infailabe karma, a weak cause may encounter a strong antidote, and causality may be broken. Immutable karma and mutable karma may have indefinite fruition. Virtuous karma can ripen slowly, and it's possible when undergoing suffering. Some illnesses result from previous lives. The Abhidharma-kosha-shastra clearly explains the workings of cause and effect. According to the Mahayanabhiddharma-sangiti-shastra, repenting from beginningless time and vowing to never commit evil again mutes evil karma which is suffering's cause. With Merit dedication, the seed of happiness is planted and may save virtuous karma and prevent it from becoming mutable. Children may inherit their parents' karma. From the relative truth perspective, when there is cause there is an effect.

=== Lopon Natsok Zugchek ===
Lopon Natsok Zugchen's 100-Day Ngondro Retreat, based on the Longchn Nyingtik and the Words of My Perfect Teacher, follows Khenpo Ngawang Pelzang's Guide and has karma teachings on the 46-55th day. The quality and benefits of cause & effect have the general meaning that virtuous action will give happiness and non-virtuous deads result in suffering.

Cause or karma has a selection of virtue, non-virtue or, equanimity, which is also called common karma and special karma (with equanimity). Thinking is mind karma, and so forth with body or voice action which is revealing. Contaminated action in samsara causes either happiness or suffering. When karma causes an effect in nirvana, the truth of the path then is called uncontaminated action.

In a single life, it is the seeing karma, resulting in ripening in the current life. In the next lifetime, it's called seeing the result in future life. Causes in a future life, see the results in another time.

Purification to reduce karma has the uncertainty of its result. Completing the karma is with the six branches:

1. complete it purposefully,
2. do it completely,
3. have no regret,
4. rejoice for having done it,
5. not being purified, and
6. having potentiality from the result ripening.

This is the karma of creation and non-accumulation.

Karma that results in the six realms is referred to as impelling karma. Karma resulting in the same life perfects the result.

== Purification of karma ==
In the Vajrayana tradition, negative past karma may be "purified" through such practices as a meditation on Vajrasattva because they both are the mind's psychological phenomenon. The performer of the action, after having purified the karma, does not experience the negative results he or she otherwise would have. Engaging in the ten negative actions out of selfishness and delusions hurts all involved. Otherwise, loving others, receives love; whereas; people with closed hearts may be prevented from happiness. One good thing about karma is that it can be purified through confession if the thoughts become positive. Within Guru Yoga seven-branch offerings practice, confession is the antidote to aversion.

=== Thubten Zopa Rinpoche ===
Thubten Zopa Rinpoche explains that purification entails applying the four powers, where each action has four aspects that determine if the action is complete or incomplete. These aspects are: motivation, object, performance, and completion. If an action is complete in all four aspects, this is throwing karma and can determine throwing rebirth into the six realms; or, if beneficial with good karma to a better rebirth. A missing aspect becomes completed karma, thus determining future life quality and a completed negative action keeps suffering ongoing. The first of the four purification powers are taking refuge and generating bodhicitta, the second is release to counteract the results similar to the cause, the third is a remedy with applying antidotes to throwing karma and the fourth is indestructible determination by overcoming tendency to habitually create negativities over and over again. (Note: Patrul four powers: Patrul Rinpoche's four powers are explained as: 1. support (Refuge in Vajrasattva and arousing bodhicitta. For example the Thirty Five Buddha provide support when reciting the Sutra in Three Parts), 2. regretting having done wrong, 3. resolution, and; 4. action as the antidote (to accomplish as many positive actions as possible).; Khenpo Ngawang Pelzang explained the essence to Patrul Rinpoche's four powers, in that: 1. support has two aspects (inner and outer), 2. regret is remorse, 3. resolution is a vow to not repeat, and; 4. action as an antidote is to develop real wish to practice dharma.)

This logic is common to all Vajrayana practices. Realizing emptiness is the ultimate purification. The four powers are confessional and are different than Christian confessionals; however, parallels exist. Each action leaves an imprint to ripen as positive for happiness or negative for suffering. Proper application requires a qualified lama to guide the process with view, reading the method alone may be insufficient.

=== Tibetan Book of the Dead ===
The Tibetan Book of the Dead contains elaborate karma purification practices to naturally liberate cyclic rebirth action. This includes natural liberation practice with the mind; with the spiritual teacher; with naked perception; with homage to sacred enlighten families for habitual tendencies; with confessional acts, with death signs visual recognition; with death ritual deception for fear; with recollection for consciousness transference; fundamentally with hearing great liberation; and with wearing through the psycho-physical aggregates. Confessional acts in this context is important for purification (without renunciation) where the four powers are 1)reliance with one hundred peaceful and wrathful deities visualization, 2)actual antidote with elaborate confessional acts natural liberation practice and Vajrasattva mantra, 3)remorse, negative acts genuine recollection, and 4) resolving to never commit such negative actions again.

== See also ==
- Buddhism
- Karma
- Karma in Buddhism
- Tibetan Buddhism

== Sources ==
- Dargyay, Lobsang (1986), "Tsong-Kha-Pa's Concept of Karma", in Neufeldt (ed.), Karma and Rebirth: Post Classical Developments, State University of New York Press, ISBN 0-87395-990-6
- Kalu Rinpoche (1993), Luminous Mind: The Way of the Buddha, Wisdom, ISBN 0-86171-118-1
- Khenpo Ngawang Pelzang (2004), A Guide to The Words of My Perfect Teacher, Shambhala Publications, ISBN 978-1-59030-073-2
- Lodro, Khenpo Tsultrim (2014), The Right View: Turning Believers Into Bodhisattvas, Larong Books, Inc, ISBN 978-986-90204-5-9
- Norgay, Khenpo Tenzin (2014), Dusting Off Your Buddha Nature: The Purpose of the Dzogchen Preliminaries, CreateSpace Independent Publishing Platform, ISBN 978-1505587319
- Padmakara Translation Group (1994), "Translators' Introduction", The Words of My Perfect teacher, HarperCollins Publishers India
- Patrul Rinpoche (1998), The Words of My Perfect Teacher, Altamira
- Patrul Rinpoche (2011), The Words of My Perfect Teacher, First University Press Edition, ISBN 978-0-300-16532-6
- Sogyal Rinpoche (2009), The Tibetan Book of Living and Dying, Harper Collins, Kindle Edition
- Thrangu Rinpoche (2012), Pointing Out The Dharmakaya: Teachings On The Ninth Karmapa's Text, Nama Buddha
- Zopa Rinpoche, Lama Thubten (2004), Becoming Vajrasattva: the tantric path of purification / Lama Tubten Yeshe : edited by Nicholas Ribush, Wisdom Publications, ISBN 0-86171-389-3
