= Palyul Monastery =

Tibetan Buddhist monastery in Baiyü County, Sichuan, China

Coordinates: 31.2157°N 98.8220°E

- Tibetan transcription(s); Tibetan: དཔལ་ཡུལ་དགོན་པ། Wylie transliteration: dpal yul dgon pa Tournadre Phonetic: Baiyü; THL: Pelyül; Other transcriptions: Palyul, Palyül; Chinese transcription(s); Traditional: 白玉寺; Simplified: 白玉寺; Pinyin: Báiyù Sì
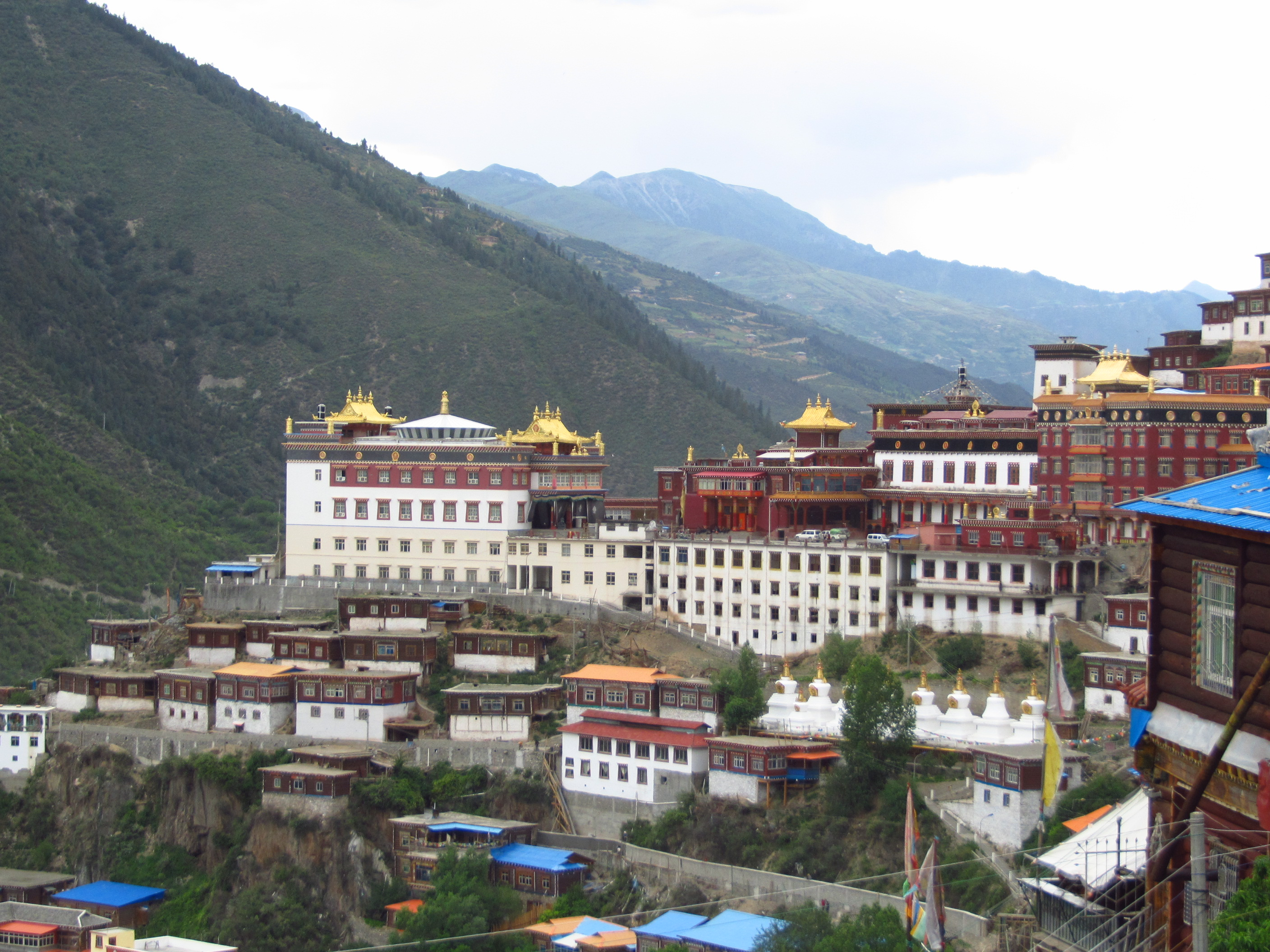
- Lower Palyul Monastery

Religion
- Affiliation: Tibetan Buddhism
- Sect: Nyingma
- Leadership: Karma Kuchen, 12th Throne-Holder of Palyul Lineage

Location
- Location: Baiyü, Baiyü County, Garzê Tibetan Autonomous Prefecture, Sichuan, China
- Country: China
- Interactive map of Palyul Monastery

Architecture
- Founder: Rigzin Kunzang Sherab
- Established: 1665; 361 years ago

Palyul Monastery (Tibetan: དཔལ་ཡུལ་རྣམ་རྒྱལ་བྱང་ཆུབ་ཆོས་གླིང་།, Wylie: dpal yul rnam rgyal byang chub chos gling), also known as Palyul Namgyal Jangchub Choling Monastery and sometimes romanized as Pelyul Monastery, is one of the "Six Mother Monasteries" of the Nyingma tradition of Tibetan Buddhism. It was founded in 1665 by Rigzin Kunzang Sherab in Pelyul in Baiyü County, Garzê Tibetan Autonomous Prefecture in China's Sichuan province, on the eastern edge of Tibet in Kham.

The monastery is the seat of the Nam Chö Terma of Terton Mingyur Dorje. Drubwang Padma Norbu (Penor Rinpoche) was the 11th throneholder of the Palyul lineage. Upon his mahaparinirvana in March 2009, Karma Kuchen Rinpoche became the 12th throneholder.

Dartang Monastery in Golok is a branch of Pelyul Monastery.

Namdroling Monastery in Bylakuppe, India, is where the current throneholder to the Palyul lineage has resided since exile from Tibet during Chinese annexation.

== Dzogchen Lineage of Palyul ==
- Chöku Kuntuzangpo (Dharmakaya Samantabhadra)
- Drugpa Dorjé Changchen (Vajradhara)
- Dorje Sempa (Vajrasattva)
- Thugjé Chenpo Chenrezig (Avalokitesvara)
- Acarya Garab Dorje (Prahevajra)
- Jampal Shenyen (Manjushrimitra)
- Acarya Shiri Sing-ha
- Yeshe Do (Jnanasutra)
- Padma Jyungnas (Padmasambhava)
- Gelong Namkhai Nyingpo
- Khandro Yeshe Tsogyal
- Nanam Dorjé Dudzom
- Lhase Mutri Tsanpo
- Tertön Zangpo Dragpa
- Trulku Rigzin Chenpo
- Kunpang Dönyöd Gyaltsan
- Gyudzin Sönam Chogzang
- Drubthob Thangthong Gyalpo
- Jangsem Kunga Nyima
- Trulzhig Trayaketu
- Tsenchen Trayavajra
- Chöjé Bodhi Sing-ha
- Trulku Tashi Gyamtso
- Drubwang Tonpa Sengge
- Trulku Chönyi Gyamtso
- Terton Mingyur Dorje
- Khaschog Karma Chagme

== Throneholders ==
- Rigzin Kunzang Sherab (rig 'dzin kun bzang shes rab, 1636–1398). He built "a temple with a reliquary stupa inside to preserve Mingyur Dorje’s relics, and had a statue of him made."
- Padma Lhundrub Gyatso
- 1st Drubwang Padma Norbu
- Karma Tashi
- Karma Lhawang and Karma Dondam
- Gyurme Nyedon Tanzin
- Padma Do-ngag Tanzin
- Do-ngag Chökyi Nyima
- 2nd Drubwang Padma Norbu (Padma Kunzang Tanzin Norbu, also known as Rig'dzin dpal chen 'dus pa)
- Karma Thegchog Nyingpo
- 3rd Drubwang Padma Norbu Rinpoche (Jigme Thubten Shedrub Chokyi Drayang Palzangpo, Wylie: 'jigs med thub bstan bshad sgrub chos kyi sgra dbyangs dpal bzang po)
- Karma Kuchen (Thubtan Tshultrim Norbu Odsal Thrinlas Kunkhyab Palzangpo)
- Drubwang Migyur Dechen Garwang Zilnon Dorje Palzangpo

== Other people ==
- Jampal Dorje (19th and 20th centuries)
