= Ngöndro =

Preliminary practice in Vajrayana

In Tibetan Buddhism, Ngöndro (Tibetan: སྔོན་འགྲོ།, Wylie: sngon 'gro, Sanskrit: pūrvaka or pūrvaṃgama) refers to the preliminary, preparatory or foundational practices or disciplines (Sanskrit: sādhanā) common to all four schools of Tibetan Buddhism and also to Bon. They precede deity yoga.

The preliminary practices establish the foundation for the more advanced and esoteric Vajrayana sādhanā which are held to engender realization and the embodiment of Dzogchen, Heruka and Mahamudra.

Nevertheless, Vajrayana masters are careful to point out that "foundational" does not mean "lesser," that the practice of Ngöndro is a complete and sufficient practice of the spiritual path, and that it can take the practitioner all the way to full enlightenment.

In addition to what is generally denoted by the term ngöndro, preparatory practices may also be prescribed for senior and advanced sadhana, e.g.: "differentiating saṃsāra and nirvāṇa" (Wylie: 'khor 'das ru shan) is the preparatory practice for trekchö or "cutting through to primordial purity."

== Outer and inner preliminaries ==
In general the preliminary practices are divided into two sections or kinds: the first are the common or ordinary kind of preliminary practices, and the second are the special or extraordinary kind of preliminaries.

=== Outer preliminaries ===
The common or ordinary preliminaries consists of a series of deep reflections or contemplations on the following four topics:

1. the freedoms and advantages of precious human rebirth
2. the truth of impermanence and change
3. the workings of karma
4. the suffering of living beings within samsara

The above four contemplations are sometimes referred to as "the four reminders" or "the four mind-changers" or "the four thoughts which turn the mind towards Dharma."

Additional reflections may be included in the specific instructions on the outer preliminaries within different lineages, but the above four topics are the main reflections.

N.B.: the Four Ordinary Foundations should not be conflated with the Satipatthana.

=== Inner preliminaries ===
The special or extraordinary kind of preliminaries consist of:

1. taking of refuge in the Three Jewels in conjunction with the performance of 100,000 prostrations (purifying pride) (Note: Prostrations may also be subsumed within sadhana repetitions of various vinyasa forms of yogic discipline, such as trul khor.)
2. cultivation of bodhicitta (purifying jealousy). In some formulations this is included under 1.
3. 100,000 recitations of Vajrasattva's hundred-syllable mantra (purifying hatred/aversion)
4. 100,000 mandala offerings (purifying attachment)
5. 100,000 guru yoga practices (purifying delusion)

Traditionally ngöndro practice is done for the enlightenment of the spiritual aspirant and for the benefit of all sentient beings. That is, the merit of doing the practices is dedicated to all sentient beings.

These practices can take 1,500 hours of work to accomplish once. Some practitioners do them multiple times. In retreat, that might take six months. Done mixed into daily life it might take years.

== Various ngöndros ==
Ngöndro is an essential practice of all schools of Tibetan Buddhism as well as the indigenous Yungdrung Bön tradition. Each of the four main schools of Tibetan Buddhism—Gelug, Kagyu, Nyingma and Sakya have variations as to the order of the preliminaries, the refuge trees visualized, the lineage gurus and deities invoked, and prayers.

Despite these differences all ngöndro practices have as their goal the enlightenment of the practitioner so that he/she may be of the greatest benefit to all sentient beings, i.e. the cultivation of bodhichitta. While some novices may feel that the ngöndro are somehow inferior to other tantric practices, they are a complete path to enlightenment in and of themselves. Patrul Rinpoche (1808–1887) is said to have practiced the Longchen Nyingthig Ngöndro repeatedly throughout his life.

Before receiving advanced tantric practices from a qualified spiritual teacher a ngöndro usually must be completed and fully internalized. This was not the case in India or early Tibet, however, as the formalized ngöndro known today was developed in Tibet.

=== Bön ===
There are two cycles of Ngöndro in Bön, Zhangzhung sNyan-rgyud and A-khrid. There are some minor differences between the two, however generally the practices are:

- Opening the Heart
- Meditation on Impermanence
- Admitting Misdeeds
- Bodhicitta
- Refuge
- Mandala Offering
- Purification Through Mantra
- Offering the Body
- Guru Yoga

Prostrations are part of this and each practice is accumulated 100,000 times.

=== Nyingma ===
==== Longchen Nyingthig Ngöndro ====
The Longchen Nyingthig (Wylie: klong chen snying thig: "Heart Essence of the Vast Expanse") is a terma cycle revealed by the master Jigme Lingpa. Since its inception in the late 18th century, it has become one of the most widespread sets of teachings in the Nyingmapa tradition. It is particularly known and loved for its extensive commentarial literature, which includes practice manuals such as the famed Kunzang Lama'i Shelung ("Words of my Perfect Teacher").

These teachings were originally transmitted by the master Padmasambhava to King Trisong Deutsen, the Dakini Yeshe Tsogyal and the Lotsawa ("translator") Vairotsana at Samye Monastery in central Tibet. As the time for these teachings to spread was not yet right, they were then written in symbolic script by Yeshe Tsogyal, entrusted to the Dakinis, and hidden to be revealed at a later time. The king later reincarnated as the tertön ("treasure revealer") Jigme Lingpa. Then, recognizing the time was ripe for them to be practiced, put them down in writing and began to teach.

Jigme Lingpa was a reincarnation of two important masters, Vimalamitra and King Trisong Deutsen. As the embodiment of these two figures, Tibet's two primary Dzogchen lineages were combined in him—the Vima Nyingthik and Khandro Nyingthik, both of which are contained in the Nyingthik Yabshi. Hence, the Longchen Nyingthig terma cycle is considered a condensation of these profound teachings.

The texts that were revealed by Jigme Lingpa, in their present-day form, comprise three volumes, known as the Nyingthig Tsapod (Wylie: snying thig rtsa pod). The numerous treatises, sadhanas and prayers it contains deal primarily with tantric practice, in particular the 'stages of Development' (Wylie: bskyed-rim) and Dzogchen.

===== In Dzogchen =====
In Finding Ease in Meditation (bsam gtan ngal gso), Longchenpa outlines three main categories of preliminary practices. He stresses that these are necessary to the practice of Dzogchen and criticizes those who attempt to skip them. The preliminaries outlined by Longchenpa are often categorized into the following schema:

- the general preliminaries on impermanence and renunciation of samsara, which corresponds to the Sravakayana;
- the special preliminaries on compassion and bodhicitta, which corresponds with the Mahayana;
- the supreme preliminaries, consisting of the generation and perfection phases of tantric Deity Yoga as well as Guru yoga.

The Longchen Nyingthig system divides preliminaries into ordinary and extraordinary types. The ordinary preliminaries are a series of contemplations of which there are two main instructional texts. One is based on Atisha's Seven Point Mind Training (Lojong) and is called the Tarpai Temke. The second is the Laglenla Deblug, and contains the following contemplations:

- appreciating our precious human existence;
- contemplating death and impermanence;
- contemplating the faults of samsaric existence;
- contemplating karmic cause and effect of one's actions;
- contemplating the benefits of liberation;
- contemplating the qualities of the lama (teacher);

The extraordinary preliminaries, which are discussed in the Drenpa Nyerzhag, are the following:

- taking refuge in the three jewels;
- cultivating bodhichitta and the compassionate mind;
- practicing Vajrasattva recitation, for purification of the gross obstacles;
- practicing mandala offerings, in which we develop generosity and strengthen our enlightenment-building network of positive force;
- making kusali offerings of chöd, in which we imagine cutting up and giving away our ordinary bodies;
- practicing Guru Yoga, in which we recognize and focus on buddha-nature in our spiritual mentors and in ourselves;

According to Jigme Lingpa, the preliminary practices are the basis of the main practices, and thus, they are not to be abandoned at a later point. Norbu writes that the preliminaries are not compulsory in Dzogchen practice (only direct introduction is essential), instead, the preliminaries are only relatively useful depending on the capacity of individuals and how many obstacles they have in their practice of contemplation.

==== Nam Cho Ngöndro ====
The Nam Cho is the "sky / space treasure" terma as revealed by Terton Mingyur Dorje in the Palyul tradition. This Ngöndro practice is known as "Buddha in the Palm of your Hand" and is preliminary for Dzogchen practice, where one can realize the mind's nature. Terton Migyur Dorje received them from Arya Avalokiteshvara and Guru Rinpoche and then transmitted them to Karma Chagme Rāga Asya.

The uncommon preliminaries are: Refuge, Bodhictta, Mandala Offering, Long Mandala Offering, The Kusali Chod, Vajrasattva, Guru Yoga, Phowa, Chenrezig Generation in the Six Realms. It includes "The Vajra Verses of the Nam Cho Dzogchen."

==== Other Nyingma ngöndros ====
- Dudjom Tersar Ngöndro
- Chokling Tersar Ngöndro
- Könchok Chidü Ngöndro
- Rangjung Pema Nyingthig Ngöndro

=== Kagyu ===
The various subsects of the Kagyu lineage tend to practice slightly different ngöndro practices. One of the most common in the Karma Kagyu lineage, called the Chariot for Travelling the Path to Freedom, was written by 9th Karmapa Wangchuk Dorje.

In the Shambhala Buddhist community, a Primordial Rigden Ngöndro written by Sakyong Mipham Rinpoche is practiced as a preliminary to various terma-derived practices received by Chögyam Trungpa Rinpoche. Practitioners later go on to practice the Karma Kagyu ngöndro and in some cases one of the Nyingma ngöndro practices.

There is also a recent English transliteration of Drukpa Kargyud Ngondro written by HH Shakya Rinchen, the 9th Jey Khenpo of Bhutan, titled "The Chariot of Liberation to the Vajra Abode" with detailed footnote and important commentaries by HH Jey Tenzin Dondup, the 69th Supreme Lord Abbot of Bhutan.

== Practice ==
With the spread of Tibetan Buddhism to the West, there are many practitioners working on different stages of ngöndro at the various Tibetan Buddhist centers in the West, in addition to practitioners at centers and monasteries in Tibet, Nepal, Ladakh, India and Bhutan.

Even though the practice of Ngöndro is now fully described in books available to the general public, lineage holders and lamas argue that it is pointless and counter-productive to initiate practice without receiving personal instruction from a teacher who has the required lineage training. Students may begin prostrations, the first section of the Ngöndro, in anticipation of receiving the Lung (blessing) from a qualified lama. This is especially helpful for students practicing in remote areas, and when travel is difficult.
