= Dodrupchen Jigme Trinle Ozer =

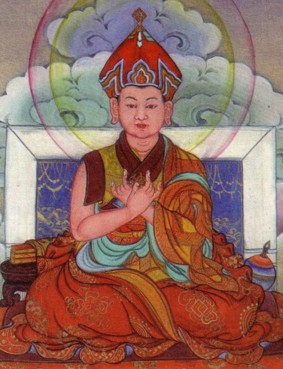
Dodrupchen Jigme Trinle Ozer

Dodrupchen Jikmé Trinlé Özer (Tibetan: རྡོ་གྲུབ་ཆེན་འཇིགས་མེད་ཕྲིན་ལས་འོད་ཟེར, Wylie: rdo grub chen ‘jigs med phrin las ‘od zer, 1745–1821) was a Nyingma tertön who was the "heart-son" of Jigme Lingpa, for whom he became the "principal doctrine-holder" (Wylie: rtsa ba'i chos bdag) of the Longchen Nyingthig terma cycle. Jigme Trinle Ozer was recognized by Jigme Lingpa as the mindstream embodiment of one of King Trisong Detsen's sons, Prince Murum Tsenpo.

== Biography ==
He was born in the Do valley in Golok.

Jigme Trinle Ozer blessed Patrul Rinpoche as a child and gave him his name whilst prophesying his eminence.

He founded Dodrupchen Monastery in Serta in 1810.

Some of his students were:

- Ngadag Yeshey Jamtsho or Garwang Yeshey Jamtsho
- Do Khyentse Yeshe Dorje

== Nomenclature, etymology and orthography ==
The name Jikmé Trinlé Özer was given by Jigme Lingpa and means "Ray of light of Fearless Actions". Sanskrit: Abhayakarmarashmi.

== Alternate names ==
- Künzang Zhenphen, Sönam Chöden, Changchup Dorje, Drubwang Dzogchenpa

== List of Drodrupchen Rinpoches ==
A list of Drodrupchen Rinpoches is as follows:

1. Dodrupchen Jikmé Trinlé Özer (1745-1821)
2. Dodrupchen Jikmé Puntsok Jungné (1824-1863)
3. Dodrupchen Jikmé Tenpé Nyima (1865-1926)
4. Dodrupchen Rigdzin Tenpé Gyaltsen (1927-1961) & Dodrupchen Tubten Trinlé Pal Zang (1927-2022)

== See also ==
- Tertön Sogyal, who exchanged teachings with Dodrupchen Jikmé Tenpé Nyima
