= Jianshe =

Jianshe (simplified Chinese: 建设; traditional Chinese: 建設; pinyin: Jiànshè), derived from the Standard Mandarin pinyin 'Jiànshè' for the Chinese '建设/建設' may refer to the following locations in China:

== Towns (建设镇) ==
- Jianshe, Chongming County, in Shanghai
- Jianshe, Zigong County, in Sichuan
- Jianshe, Sanzhi County, in Sichuan
- Jianshe, Baiyü County, in Garze Tibetan Autonomous Prefecture, Sichuan
- Jianshe, Datian County, in Fujian
- Jianshe, Fuxin County, in Fuxin Mongol Autonomous County, Liaoning

== Subdistricts (建设街道) ==
- Jianshe Subdistrict, Yakeshi, in Inner Mongolia
- Jianshe Subdistrict, Jiaxing, in Nanhu District, Jiaxing, Zhejiang
- Jianshe Subdistrict, Shangqiu, in Liangyuan District, Shangqiu, Henan
- Jianshe Subdistrict, Zhuzhou, in Lusong District, Zhuzhou, Hunan
- Jianshe Subdistrict, Guangzhou, in Yuexiu District, Guangzhou, Guangdong
- Jianshe Subdistrict, Zhanjiang, in Xiashan District, Zhanjiang, Guangdong
- Jianshe Subdistrict, Jiayuguan City, in Jiayuguan City, Gansu

== Village (建设村) ==
- Liuji, Liuji, Dawu County, Xiaogan, Hubei
