= Samaya =

Vows that binds guru and disciple

The samaya (Tibetan: དམ་ཚིག, Wylie: dam tshig, Chinese: 三昧耶戒, pinyin: Sānmèiyē jiè; rōmaji: sonmaya kai), is a set of vows or precepts given to initiates of an esoteric Vajrayana Buddhist order as part of the abhiṣeka (empowerment or initiation) ceremony that creates a bond between the guru and disciple.

According to Keown, et al., samaya may be defined as:

- A particular system of teaching or doctrines;
- The conduct required of a tantric practitioner, often as a set of vows or commitments;
- The realization (abhisamaya) of Buddhahood;
- In Tantric Buddhism, union with the trikaya, the body, speech and mind of the Buddha.

== Indo-Tibetan Buddhism ==
=== Fourteen root downfalls ===
In one of the most widely followed teachings on samaya, Sakya Pandita, a preeminent 12th century Tibetan Buddhism scholar, outlined fourteen primary points of observance to consider in keeping one's samaya vow pure.

1. Disrespecting the vajra master.
2. Transgressing the words of the buddhas.
3. Insulting one's vajra brothers and sisters.
4. Abandoning love for sentient beings.
5. Abandoning the bodhichitta in aspiration or application.
6. Criticizing the teachings of the sutras and tantras.
7. Revealing secrets to those who are unworthy.
8. Mistreating one's body.
9. Rejecting emptiness.
10. Keeping bad company.
11. Failing to reflect on emptiness.
12. Upsetting those who have faith in the teachings.
13. Failing to observe the samaya commitments.
14. Denigrating women.

Jamgon Kongtrul comments on the Lamrim Yeshe Ningpo that samaya is established by taking abhiṣeka and samaya is the manner in which practitioners "preserve the life-force of that empowerment within your being".

=== Root and branch ===
Khenpo Karthar Rinpoche defines root samayas as any which if violated would remove all the benefit from practicing. He defines branch samayas as any which if violated would diminish or impair the benefit of practice. He states that the most egregious root samaya to violate is the commitment to one's guru.

Foregrounding the mindful observance of the mindstream, whilst intimating the binding reciprocity of samaya, Gyatrul (b. 1924) in his commentary to Chagmé (Wylie: karma-chags-med, fl. 17th century), rendered into English by Wallace (Chagmé et al., 1998: p. 29) states:

If a Lama obstinately refuses to grant instruction to a qualified disciple, this constitutes an infraction of the Lama's samaya. It is proper for the Lama to show some hesitation by not consenting on the first request in order to arouse and examine the disciple. It is not a ploy to see if the amount of offerings can be increased, but rather provides time to examine the student's mind-stream.

In the Nyingma lineage, the three root samayas are categorized as body, speech, and mind. Each requires refraining from non-virtue as well as maintaining sacred view. Maintaining sacred view generally means to view all beings and all phenomenon as 'primordially pure' (Tib: kadak). The samaya of body is to refrain from non-virtue with respect to body, and also to always offer yourself to your guru and to your vajra sangha. The samaya of speech is to avoid non-virtuous speech, and also to never forget one's commitment to practicing mantra. The samaya of mind is to refrain from divulging the secrets and to always maintain the view that one's mind is dharmakaya.

=== Repairing damaged samaya ===
According to Tulku Urgyen Rinpoche, there are four increasing stages in which one's samaya may be damaged: "infraction, breach, violation, and complete break". Once damaged, samaya may be repaired. But if it is left without repair for more than three years, it is not repairable.

Samaya is easily damaged. Patrul Rinpoche said it is very hard to maintain samaya and used a famous metaphor that maintaining samaya is like keeping a mirror or tile clean that is lifted up into a sand storm; dust settles on it as soon as it is clean and we must continuously clean it. To repair samaya, a practitioner may restore mindfulness and awareness of sacred view; confess the violation to another practitioner that holds samaya; recite the one hundred syllable mantra (Vajrasattva mantra); or use other methods determined by their guru.

== Shingon Buddhism ==
In the esoteric lineage of Japanese Shingon Buddhism, the samaya precedes the Abhiseka initiation ceremony proper. The initiate undertakes four precepts:

1. Never to abandon the True Dharma.
2. Never to negate bodhicitta.
3. Never to withhold or be selective of Buddhist teachings toward others.
4. Never to cause any sentient being any harm.

The first recorded taking of the samaya precepts at Tōdai-ji temple began in 822 when Kukai performed the Abhiseka ritual before the abdicated emperor, Heizei, and helped to establish Shingon Buddhism as a legitimate school in Japan.
