= Denglong Township, Sichuan =

Denglong Township 登龙乡
- Township
- Location in Sichuan
- Coordinates: 31°32′39″N 99°8′42″E
- Country: People's Republic of China
- Province: Sichuan
- Autonomous prefecture: Garzê Tibetan Autonomous Prefecture
- County: Baiyü County
- Time zone: UTC+8 (China Standard)

Denglong Township (simplified Chinese: 登龙乡; traditional Chinese: 登龍鄉; pinyin: Dēnglóng Xiāng) is a township under the administration of Baiyü County, Garzê Tibetan Autonomous Prefecture, Sichuan, China. As of 2020, it administers the following six villages:

- Wusa Village (乌萨村)
- Dongtuo Village (洞拖村)
- Dingge Village (定各村)
- Kangtong Village (康通村)
- Gongba Village (龚巴村)
- Nuozong Village (诺宗村)

== See also ==
- List of township-level divisions of Sichuan
