= Baiyü County =

Baiyü County 白玉县 · དཔལ་ཡུལ་རྫོང Baiyu, Pelyül
- County
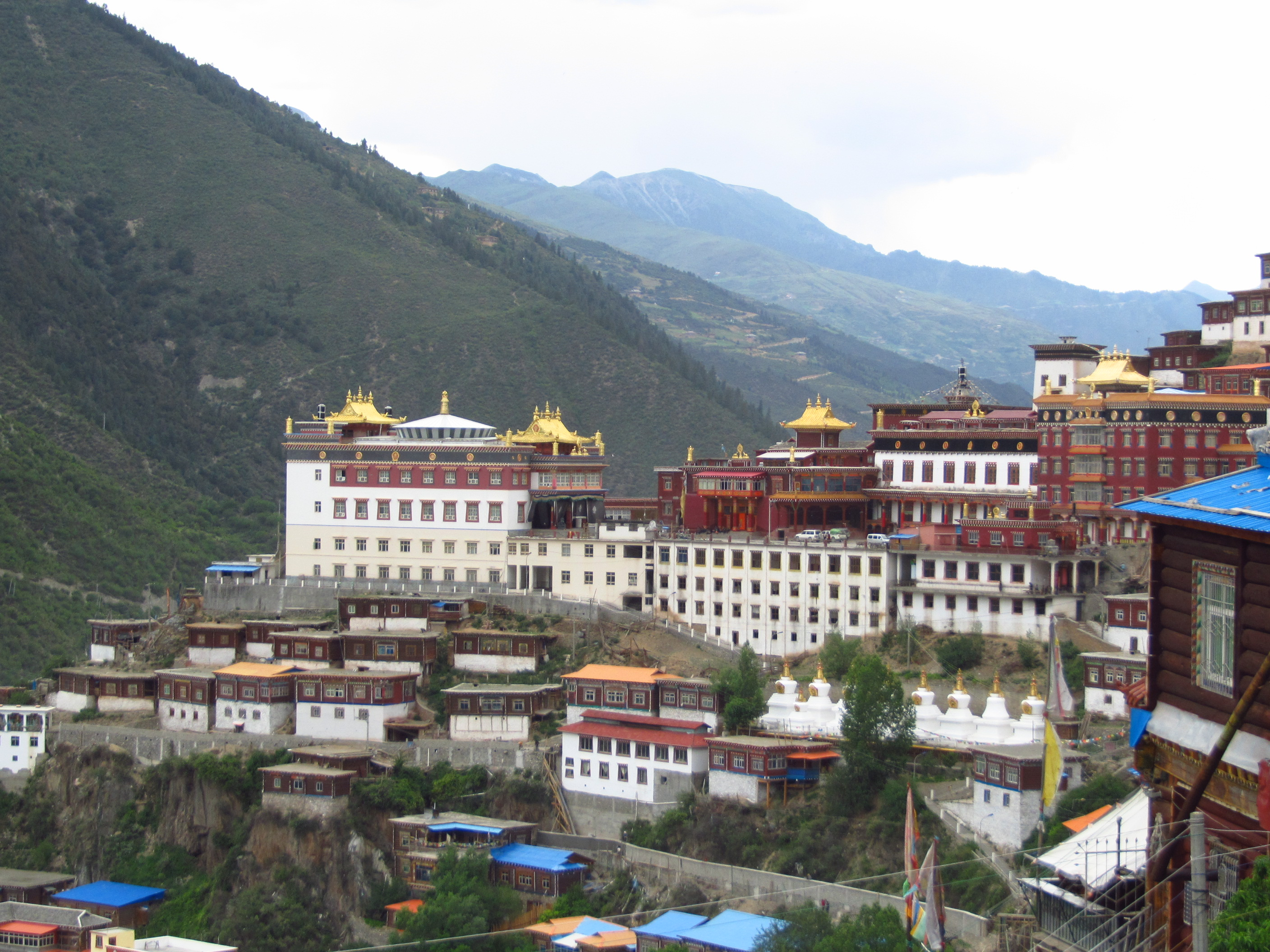
- Palyul Monastery in Baiyü

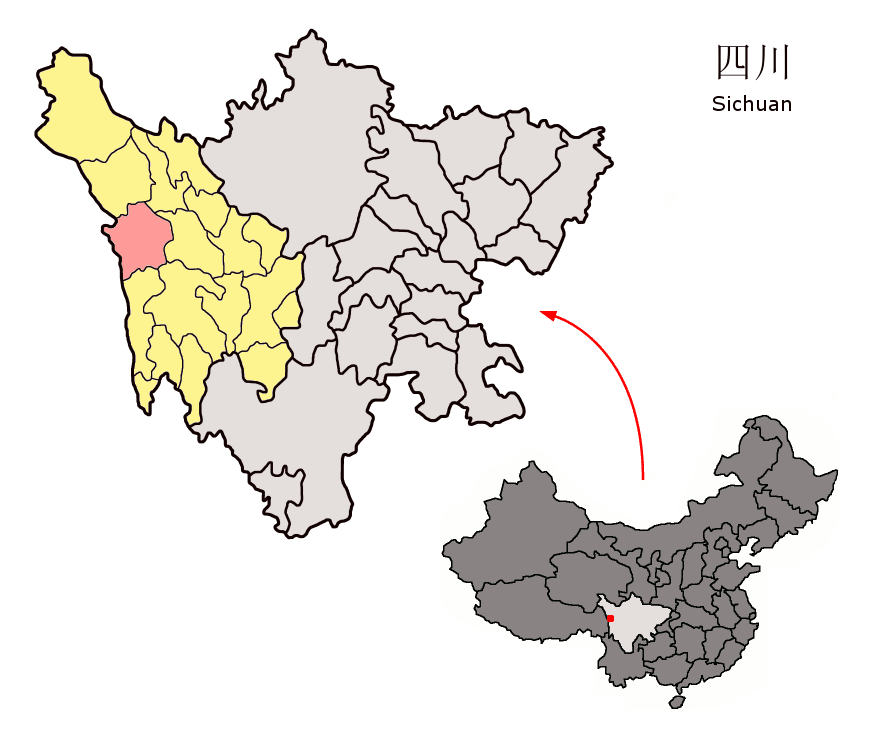
- Location of Baiyü County (red) within Garzê Prefecture (yellow) and Sichuan

- Location in Sichuan Baiyü (China)
- Coordinates: 31°13′N 98°49′E
- Country: China
- Province: Sichuan
- Autonomous prefecture: Garzê
- County seat: Zugzhün (Jianshe)

Area
  - Total: 10,386 km^{2} (4,010 sq mi)
- Elevation: 3,012 m (9,882 ft)

Population (2020)
  - Total: 59,524
  - Density: 5.7312/km^{2} (14.844/sq mi)
- Time zone: UTC+8 (China Standard)
- Website: www.baiyu.gov.cn

Baiyü County

Chinese name
- Simplified Chinese: 白玉县
- Traditional Chinese: 白玉縣
Transcriptions
Standard Mandarin
- Hanyu Pinyin: Báiyù Xiàn

Tibetan name
- Tibetan: དཔལ་ཡུལ་རྫོང་།
Transcriptions
- Wylie: dpal yul rdzong
- Tibetan Pinyin: Baiyü Zong

Baiyü County or Pelyül (Tibetan: དཔལ་ཡུལ།, Chinese: 白玉县) is a county in far western Sichuan, China on the border with the Tibet Autonomous Region. It is under the administration of the Garzê Tibetan Autonomous Prefecture.

== Administrative divisions ==
Baiyü County is divided into 4 towns and 12 townships.

Name	Simplified Chinese	Hanyu Pinyin	Tibetan	Wylie	Administrative division code
Towns
Zugzhün Town (Jianshe)	建设镇	Jiànshè Zhèn	འཛུགས་སྐྲུན་གྲོང་རྡལ།	'dzugs skrun grong rdal	513331100
Acab Town (Acha)	阿察镇	Āchá Zhèn	ཨ་ཚབ་གྲོང་རྡལ།	a tshab grong rdal	513331101
Horbo Town (Hepo)	河坡镇	Hépō Zhèn	ཧོར་སྤོ་གྲོང་རྡལ།	hor spo grong rdal	513331102
Gajê Town (Gaiyu)	盖玉镇	Gàiyù Zhèn	སྒ་རྗེ་གྲོང་རྡལ།	sga rje grong rdal	513331103
Townships
Zhi'gyü Township (Jinsha)	金沙乡	Jīnshā Xiāng	འབྲི་རྒྱུད་ཤང་།	'bri rgyud shang	513331200
Ronggêb Township (Ronggai)	绒盖乡	Rónggài Xiāng	རོང་འགེབས་ཤང་།	rong 'gebs shang	513331201
Zangdo Township (Zomdo, Zhangdu)	章都乡	Zhāngdū Xiāng	གཙང་མདོ་ཤང་།	gtsang mdo shang	513331202
Barong Township (Barrong, Marong)	麻绒乡	Máróng Xiāng	འབར་རོང་ཤང་།	'bar rong shang	513331203
Ragkyab Township (Rejia)	热加乡	Rèjiā Xiāng	རག་ཁྱབ་ཤང་།	rag khyab shang	513331205
Dêrlung Township (Denglong)	登龙乡	Dēnglóng Xiāng	གཏེར་ལུང་ཤང་།	gter lung shang	513331206
Zinkog Township (Zengke)	赠科乡	Zèngkē Xiāng	འཛིན་ཁོག་ཤང་།	'dzin khog shang	513331207
Barqung Township (Maqiong)	麻邛乡	Máqióng Xiāng	འབར་ཆུང་ཤང་།	'bar chung shang	513331209
Nyamgyi Township (Liaoxi)	辽西乡	Liáoxī Xiāng	མཉམ་སྐྱིད་ཤང་།	mnyam skyid shang	513331210
Damtar Township (Nata)	纳塔乡	Nàtǎ Xiāng	འདམ་ཐར་ཤང་།	'dam thar shang	513331211
Anzi Township	安孜乡	Ānzī Xiāng	ཨ་འཛི་ཤང་།	a 'dzi shang	513331212
Samar Township (Shama)	沙马乡	Shāmǎ Xiāng	ས་དམར་ཤང་།	sa dmar shang	513331214

== Climate ==
Climate data for Baiyü, elevation 3,064 m (10,052 ft), (1991–2020 normals, extremes 1981–2010)
Month	Jan	Feb	Mar	Apr	May	Jun	Jul	Aug	Sep	Oct	Nov	Dec	Year
Record high °C (°F)	23.1 (73.6)	23.7 (74.7)	29.0 (84.2)	30.1 (86.2)	31.3 (88.3)	35.4 (95.7)	35.6 (96.1)	32.7 (90.9)	31.4 (88.5)	29.0 (84.2)	24.4 (75.9)	21.2 (70.2)	35.6 (96.1)
Mean daily maximum °C (°F)	10.1 (50.2)	12.5 (54.5)	15.2 (59.4)	18.3 (64.9)	22.2 (72.0)	24.5 (76.1)	25.2 (77.4)	24.9 (76.8)	22.6 (72.7)	18.5 (65.3)	14.3 (57.7)	10.4 (50.7)	18.2 (64.8)
Daily mean °C (°F)	−0.7 (30.7)	2.3 (36.1)	5.7 (42.3)	9.0 (48.2)	12.8 (55.0)	15.4 (59.7)	16.2 (61.2)	15.7 (60.3)	13.2 (55.8)	8.5 (47.3)	3.2 (37.8)	−0.9 (30.4)	8.4 (47.1)
Mean daily minimum °C (°F)	−8.9 (16.0)	−5.8 (21.6)	−1.8 (28.8)	1.9 (35.4)	5.8 (42.4)	9.5 (49.1)	10.7 (51.3)	10.2 (50.4)	7.9 (46.2)	2.4 (36.3)	−4.3 (24.3)	−8.9 (16.0)	1.6 (34.8)
Record low °C (°F)	−18.5 (−1.3)	−15.8 (3.6)	−11.7 (10.9)	−7.1 (19.2)	−3.7 (25.3)	1.2 (34.2)	2.7 (36.9)	0.9 (33.6)	−1.5 (29.3)	−7.1 (19.2)	−12.8 (9.0)	−18.6 (−1.5)	−18.6 (−1.5)
Average precipitation mm (inches)	1.3 (0.05)	3.3 (0.13)	12.4 (0.49)	35.9 (1.41)	55.6 (2.19)	124.7 (4.91)	144.9 (5.70)	125.2 (4.93)	101.8 (4.01)	33.6 (1.32)	4.9 (0.19)	1.1 (0.04)	644.7 (25.37)
Average precipitation days (≥ 0.1 mm)	1.2	3.4	7.0	12.6	16.5	21.8	21.4	18.8	18.5	10.9	2.9	1.2	136.2
Average snowy days	2.9	6.6	7.5	3.0	0.2	0	0	0	0	0.9	3.3	2.6	27
Average relative humidity (%)	34	35	42	51	56	67	72	72	74	66	49	40	55
Mean monthly sunshine hours	170.2	152.6	165.1	176.1	198.9	185.2	190.0	178.9	169.4	171.6	174.9	180.1	2,113
Percentage possible sunshine	53	48	44	45	47	44	44	44	46	49	56	58	48
Source: China Meteorological Administration

== Monasteries ==
The Palyul Monastery is located in Baiyü County as is the Yarchen Monastery and Katok Monastery. Nyoshul Jonpalung Monastery (སྨྱོ་ཤུལ་ལྗོན་པ་ལུང་དགོན།; 辽西寺 / 辽西圆林; Liáoxī Sì / Liáoxī yuánlín), founded by Khenpo Ngaga (1879-1941) in 1910, is located in the county's Dzin Valley of Tromtar. It is a Nyingma monastery which is considered a branch of Katok.

Adzom Gön Monastery (Anzom, Anzom Chogar, 'od gsal theg mchog gling, Osel Tekchok Ling, Osal Tegchogling) is another branch of Katok in the Tromtar (romkok (khrom tar / khrom khog) region.

The founder, Adzom Drukpa Drondul Pawo Dorje (a 'dzom 'brug pa 'gro 'dul dpa' bo rdo rje) was born in 1842 in Tashi Dungkargang in the Tromtar region.

Tromge Monastery (Tromge Gon khrom dge dgon; 昌根寺; Chānggēn Sì) was founded in 1275 in the Tromtar Valley. It is a branch of Katok Monastery.

Jazi Amnye Drodul Pema Garwang Lingpa (1901-1975) entered Tromge Monastery at age 11.

Tromge Monastery School was established in the 2000s to provide a traditional education to about two dozen students.
