= Namchö Mingyur Dorje =

Tibetan treasure revealer

- gNam-chos Mi-'gyur rdo-rje
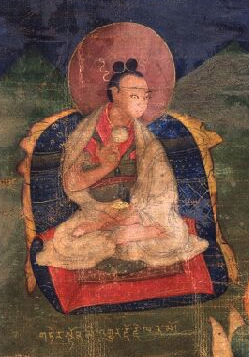

Personal life
- Born: 1645 Near the Nabun Fortress in Ngom, Nangchen, Kham
- Died: 1667 (aged 21–22)
- Notable work(s): “Hundred Thousand Names of the Buddhas” prayer, and other texts on fire-puja rituals, grammar, poetry, spiritual poems, collected in three small volumes, in addition to 13 volumes of revealed treasures

Religious life
- Religion: Buddhism
- Sect: Nyingma
- Dharma name: Tertön Sherab Mebar (gter ston shes rab me 'bar) ("Treasure Revealer with Blazing Wisdom")

Senior posting
- Teacher: Karma Chagme (ka+rma chags med 1610/1613-1678)
- Successor: Namcho Rigdzin Namkha Chowang (gnam chos rig 'dzin nam mkha' chos dbang, died 1784)
- Reincarnation: Trulzhik Chenpo Wangdrak Gyatso ('khrul zhig chen po dbang drag rgya mtsho, died c. 1640)

Namchö Mingyur Dorje (Tibetan: གནམ་ཆོས་མི་འགྱུར་རྡོ་རྗེ།, Wylie: gnam chos mi 'gyur rdo rje; 1645–1667) was a Tibetan tertön or "treasure revealer" in Tibetan Buddhism. His extraordinary "pure vision" revelations, which mostly occurred around the age of 16, are known as the Namchö (Wylie: gnam-chos "Sky Dharma" terma. He first transmitted these to his teacher Karma Chagmé (Wylie: karma chags med, 1613-1678), the illustrious Buddhist scholar of the Kagyu school, who wrote them down.

He showed signs of illness at age 23, which progressed to his mind stream dissolving in to the great sphere of empty truth with full eight Heruka vision and mandalas.

He was also known as Drakpo Nuden Tsel, Mingyur Dorje, Terton Mingyur Dorje, and Terton Sherab Mebar.

== Works ==
The collection of his revelations fill thirteen Tibetan volumes and are the basis of one of the main practice traditions of the Palyul lineage, a major branch of the Nyingma school of Tibetan Buddhism. He was considered to be a reincarnation of Palgyi Senge of Shubu, one of the ministers the 8th-century Tibetan King Trisong Detsen sent to invite Padmasambhava to Tibet. He recognized Kunzang Sherab as the Lineage Holder of the Namchö terma.

Loden Chegse, one of Padmasambhava's eight emanations, had a vision which helped him learn to read and write. At age 7, his Dakini visions helped focus on reliance upon the lama. At age 10, after a vision and with a Dharma Protector's help, he met his root lama Karma Chagme. Karma Chakmé recognized him as manifestation of Padmasambhava, Senge Dradok. Mingyur Dorje revealed the Namchö treasures at age thirteen, which were written down with Karma Chakmé's help while they stayed in retreat together for three years.

== See also ==
- Namchö
