= Geoffrey Barstow =

American Buddhist scholar

- Occupation: Buddhist scholar

Geoffrey Francis Barstow is an American religious historian and Buddhist scholar whose research focuses on Tibetan Buddhist ideas about animal ethics and vegetarianism.

== Biography ==
Barstow was educated in Buddhist studies at Hampshire College and Kathmandu University where he obtained his B.A. He obtained his PhD in religious studies from University of Virginia in 2013. Barstow is assistant professor of religious studies at Oregon State University. He is a student of Chökyi Nyima Rinpoche.

In 2017, Barstow authored Food of Sinful Demons: Meat, Vegetarianism and the Limits of Buddhism in Tibet, which has been positively reviewed. It is the first academic book to significantly explore vegetarianism in Tibet in its cultural and religious context. James Stewart in the Journal of Buddhist Ethics described it as "a comprehensive study of Tibetan vegetarianism within the context of the pre-communist era. It is a pleasurable read, thoughtfully written, and deploys well supported arguments that draw upon a wealth of Buddhist literature."

In 2019, Barstow was the editor of The Faults of Meat: Tibetan Buddhist Writings on Vegetarianism. Barstow has given online courses on Buddhism and animal welfare.

== Selected publications ==
- Buddhism Between Abstinence and Indulgence: Vegetarianism in the Life and Works of Jigme Lingpa, Journal of Buddhist Ethics, 2013
- Food of Sinful Demons: Meat, Vegetarianism, and the Limits of Buddhism in Tibet, Columbia University Press, 2017
- The Hidden Vegetarians of Tibet, Tricycle, 2018
- Monastic Meat: The Question of Meat Eating and Vegetarianism in Tibetan Buddhist Monastic Guidelines (bca’ yig), Religions, 2019
- The Faults of Meat: Tibetan Buddhist Writings on Vegetarianism, Wisdom Publications, 2019
