= Vajrasattva =

Deity in Buddhism

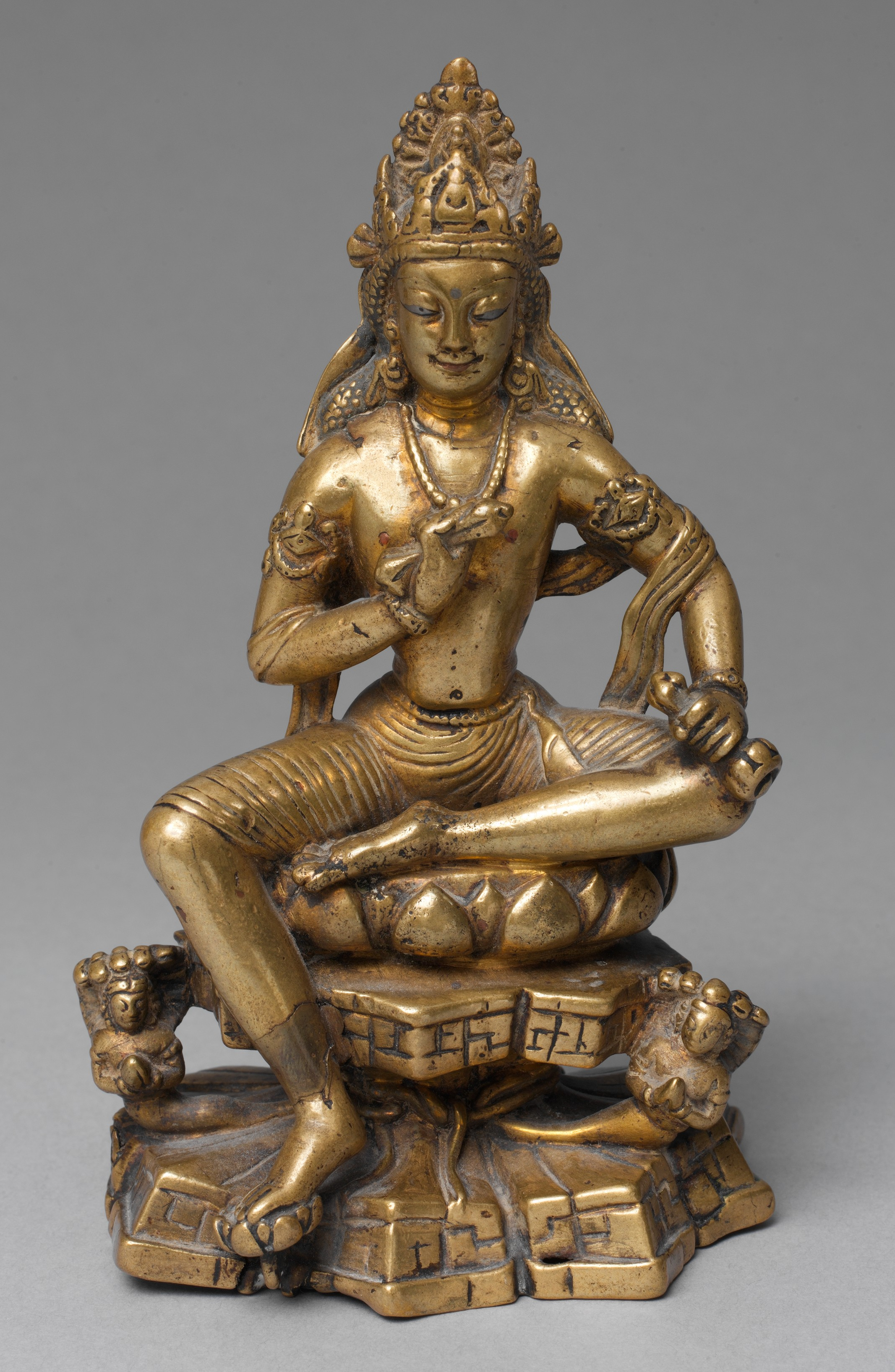
- Sanskrit: वज्रसत्त्व; Vajrasatva
- Chinese: 金剛薩埵菩薩 (Pinyin: Jīngāng Sàduǒ Púsà)
- Japanese: 金剛薩埵菩薩(こんごうさったぼさつ) (romaji: Kongōsatta Bosatsu)
- Khmer: វជ្រសត្វ (vach-cha-sat)
- Korean: 금강살타보살 (RR: Geumgang Salta Bosal)
- Mongolian: ᠲᠣᠷᠵᠢᠰᠡᠮᠪᠡ᠂ ᠪᠠᠵᠠᠷᠰᠠᠳ; Доржсэмбэ, Базарсад (Dorjisembe, Bajarsad)
- Tagalog: Baklasattba
- Thai: พระวัชรสัตว์โพธิสัตว์
- Tibetan: རྡོ་རྗེ་སེམས་དཔའ་ Wylie: rdo rje sems dpa' THL: Dorje Sempa རྡོར་སེམས་ THL: Dorsem
- Vietnamese: Kim Cang Tát Đỏa Bồ Tát

Information
- Venerated by: Mahāyāna, Vajrayāna

Vajrasattva (Sanskrit: वज्रसत्त्व, Tibetan: རྡོ་རྗེ་སེམས་དཔའ། Dorje Sempa, short form: རྡོར་སེམས། Dorsem) is a bodhisattva in the Mahayana and Mantrayana/Vajrayana Buddhist traditions.

In Chinese Buddhism and the Japanese Shingon tradition, Vajrasattva is the esoteric aspect of the bodhisattva Samantabhadra and is commonly associated with the student practitioner who, through the master's teachings, attains an ever-enriching, subtle and rarefied grounding in their esoteric practice. In the East Asian esoteric Buddhist Diamond Realm Mandala, Vajrasattva sits to the East near Akshobhya Buddha.

In some esoteric lineages, Nagarjuna was said to have met Vajrasattva in an iron tower in South India, and was taught tantra, thus transmitting the esoteric teachings to more historical figures. In Tibetan Buddhism, Vajrasattva is associated with the sambhogakāya and with purification practice.

Vajrasattva appears in various Buddhist texts, including in the esoteric Vairocanābhisaṃbodhi Sūtra and in the Vajraśekhara Sūtra. Vajrasattva also appears as a major character in the Ghanavyūha sūtra. In the Nyingma canon, Vajrasattva also appears in various Dzogchen texts, such as the Kulayarāja Tantra and The Mirror of the Heart of Vajrasattva.

Vajrasattva's mantra is oṃ Vajrasattva hūṃ (Sanskrit: ॐ वज्रसत्त्व हूँ; Chinese: 唵 斡資囉 薩答 啊 吽 / 嗡 班扎 薩埵 吽; Pinyin: ǎn wòzīluō sàdá a hōng / wēng bānzhā sàduǒ hōng).

== Meaning of name ==
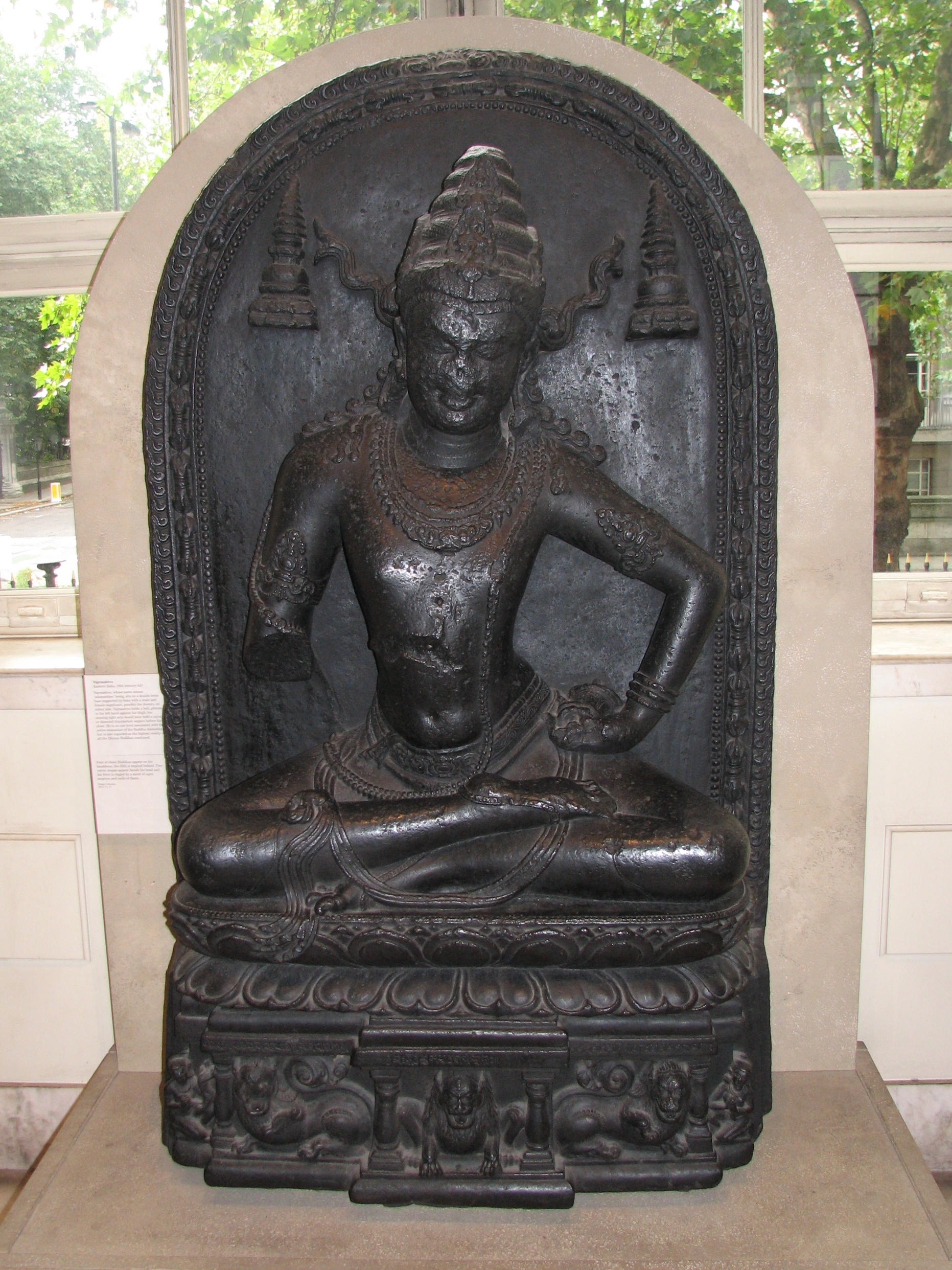
Stone relief of Vajrasattva, From eastern India, 10th century CE

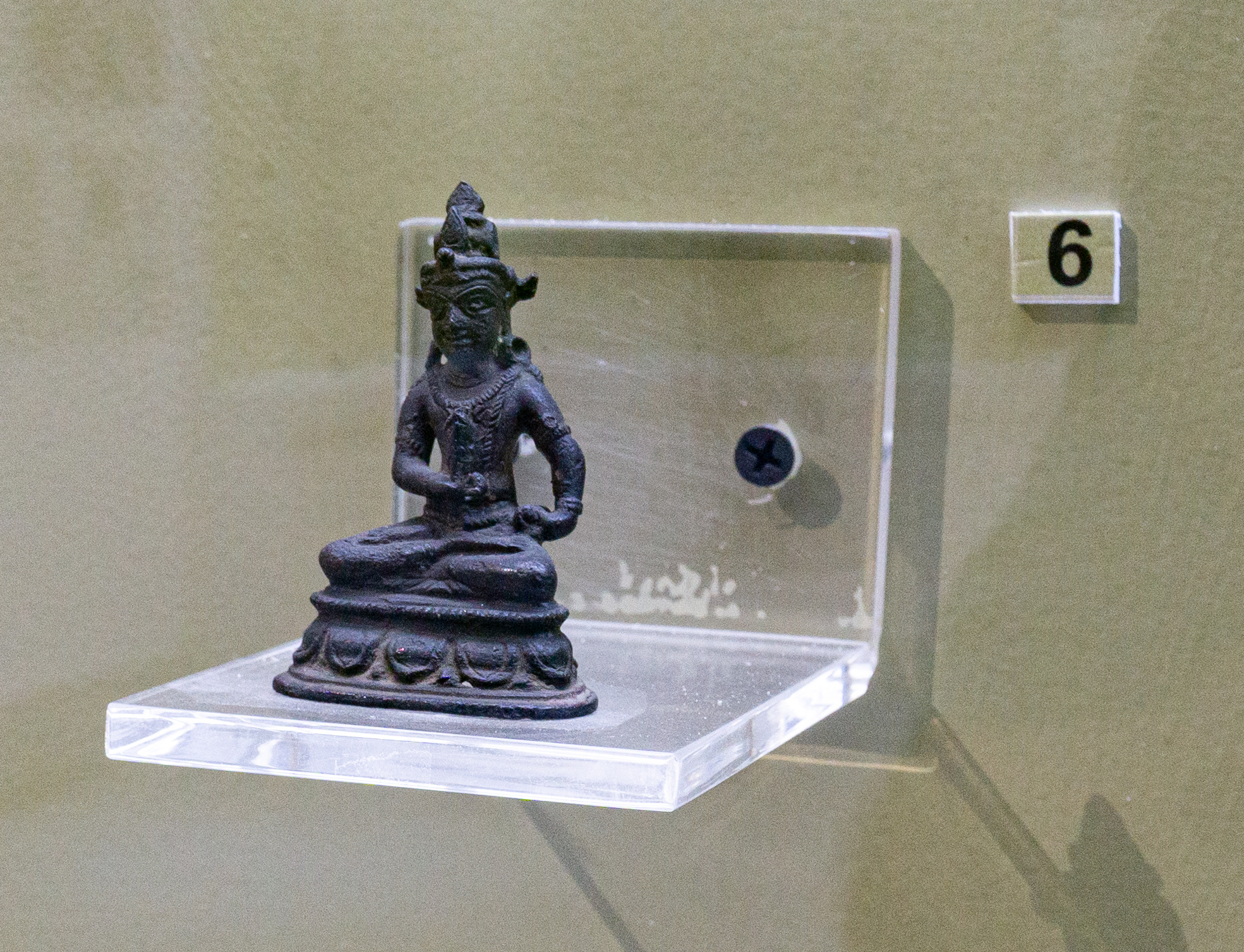
Sculpture of Vajrasattva currently housed in the Nalanda Museum in Bihar

Vajrasattva's name translates to Diamond Being (Sattva roughly translates to hero/being/saint) or Thunderbolt Being. The vajra, a symbol of insight, is associated with Esoteric Buddhism.

== Newar Buddhism ==
Vajrasattva is an important figure in the tantric Buddhism of the Newar People of the Kathmandu Valley. He represents the ideal guru, and he is frequently invoked in the guru maṇḍala, the foundational ritual for all other Newar Buddhist rituals and the daily pūjā for Newar priests (vajrācāryas). The śatākṣara (100 syllable prayer to Vajrasattva) is memorized by many practicing Newar Buddhist priests.

== East Asian Buddhism ==
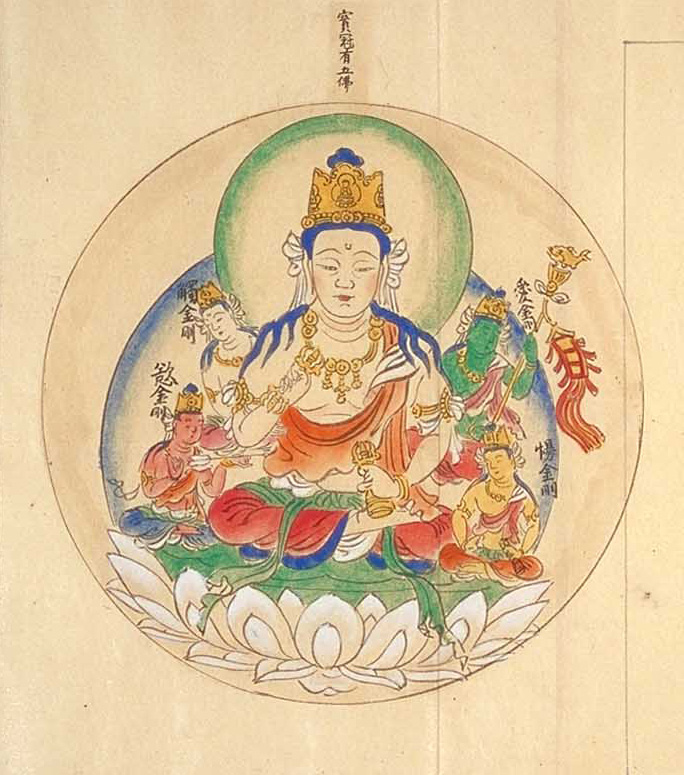
Depiction of Vajrasattva seated on a lotus. Japan, 14th century CE

In Chinese Buddhism and Shingon, Vajrasattva is traditionally viewed as the second patriarch of Esoteric Buddhism, the first being Vairocana Buddha. Kukai, in Record of the Dharma Transmission, relates a story based on Amoghavajra's account, of Nagarjuna having met Vajrasattva in an iron tower in southern India. Vajrasattva initiated Nagarjuna into the abhiseka ritual and entrusted him with the esoteric teachings he had learned from Vairocana Buddha, as depicted in the Mahavairocana Sutra. Kukai does not elaborate further on Vajrasattva or his origins.

Elsewhere, Vajrasattva is an important figure in two esoteric Buddhist sutras, the Mahavairocana Sutra and the Vajrasekhara Sutra. In the first chapter of the Mahavairocana Sutra, Vajrasattva leads a host of beings who visit Vairocana Buddha to learn the Dharma. Vajrasattva inquires about the cause, goal and foundation of all-embracing wisdom, which leads to a philosophical discourse delivered by the Buddha. The audience cannot comprehend the teaching, so the Buddha demonstrates through the use of mandala. Vajrasattva then questions why rituals and objects are needed, if the truth is beyond form. Vairocana Buddha replies to Vajrasattva that these are expedient means, whose function is to bring practitioners to awakening more readily, and so on. In Shingon Buddhist rituals for initiation, the kechien kanjō, the initiate re-enacts the role of Vajrasattva and recites mantra and dialogue from the sutras above. The Mahācārya enacts the role of Mahavairocana Buddha, bestowing wisdom upon the student.

In certain esoteric Chinese Buddhist rituals, such as the Yujia Yankou rite (Chinese: 瑜伽燄口; pinyin: Yújiā Yànkǒu), Vajrasattva's Hundred Syllable Mantra is commonly recited as part of the liturgy, while the performing monastic uses ritual vajras and ghantas to expel demons from the ritual platform. Besides these rituals, in different other rituals such as repentance rites, some monastics have also been known to utilize the mantra oṃ Vajrasattva hūṃ (Chinese: 嗡 班扎薩埵 吽; pinyin: Wēng bānzhāsàduǒ hōng).

== Tibetan Buddhism ==
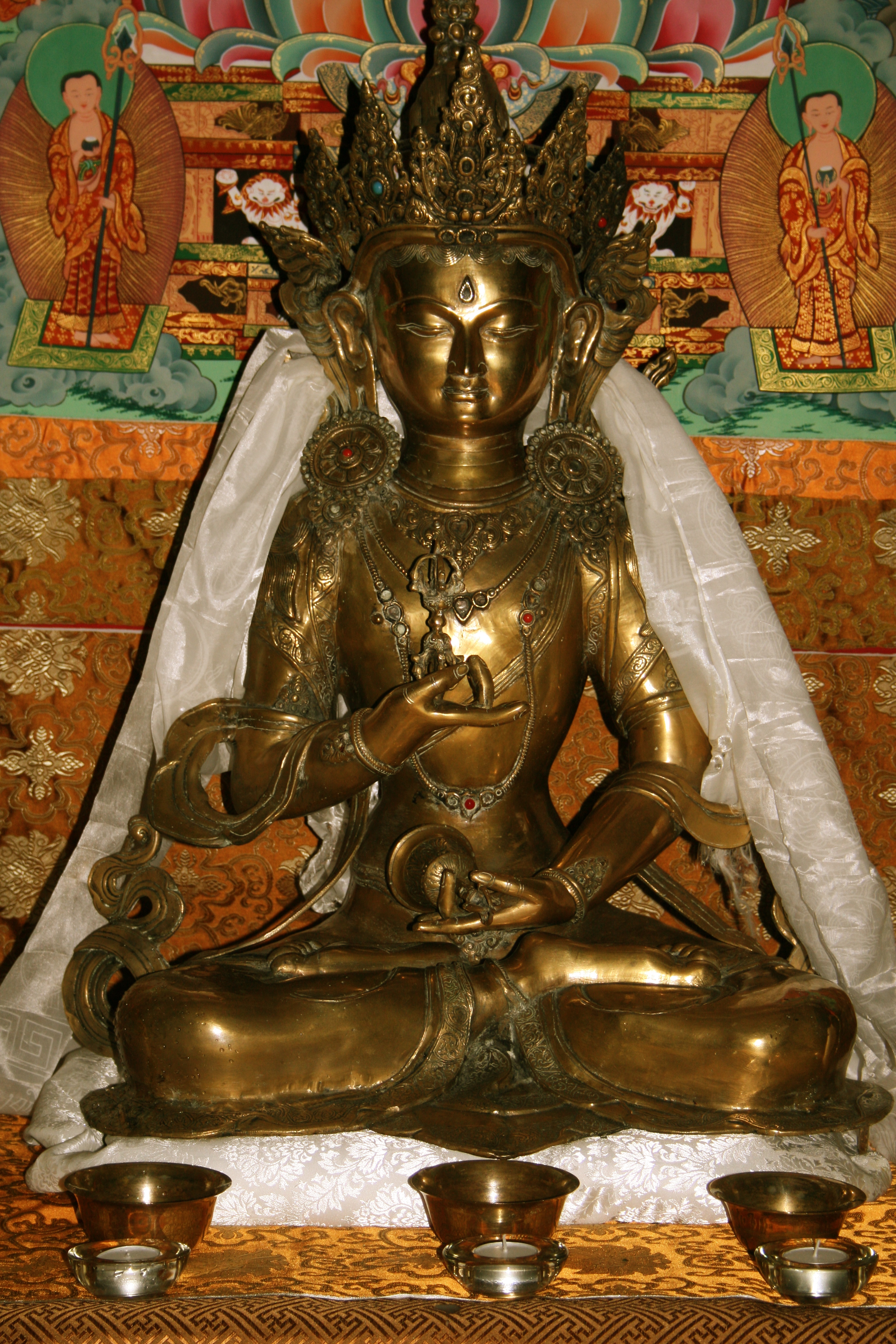
Modern Tibetan Buddhist Vajrasattva statue

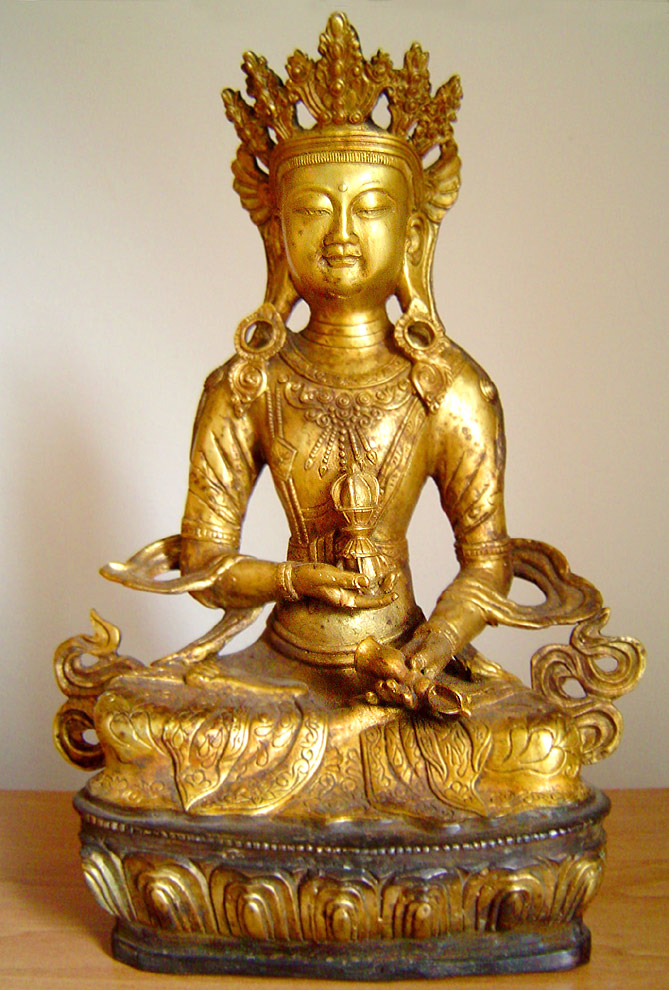
Tibetan style (Chinese, Qing dynasty) Vajrasatva holds the vajra in his right hand and a bell in his left hand.

In Tibetan Buddhism the Vajrasattva root tantra is Dorje Gyan, or "Vajra Ornament". Vajrasattva practices are common to all of the five schools of Tibetan Buddhism and are used both to purify obscurations so that the Vajrayana student can progress beyond Ngondro practices to the various yoga practices of tantra and also to purify any broken samaya vows after initiation. As such, Vajrasattva practice is an essential element of Tibetan Buddhist practice.

In addition to personal practice, the Vajrasattva mantra is regarded as having the ability to purify karma, bring peace, and cause enlightened activity in general. Following the September 11, 2001 attacks on the United States, The Dzogchen Ponlop Rinpoche announced a project, Prayer 4 Peace, to accumulate one billion six syllable Vajrasattva recitations from practitioners around the world. The six syllable mantra (oṁ Vajrasattva Hūṁ), is a less formal version of the one hundred syllable mantra on which it is based but contains the essential spiritual points of the longer mantra, according to lama and tulku Jamgon Kongtrul.

=== Dzogchen ===
"The Mirror of the Heart of Vajrasattva" (Tibetan: རྡོ་རྗེ་སེམས་དཔའ་སྙིང་གི་མེ་ལོང, Wylie: rdo rje sems dpa' snying gi me long) is one of the Seventeen Tantras of Dzogchen Upadesha.

Samantabhadra discourses to Vajrasattva and in turn Vajrasattva asks questions of Samantabhadra in clarification in the Kulayaraja Tantra (Wylie: kun byed rgyal po, THL: künjé gyalpo) or "The All-Creating King Tantra", the main tantra of the Mind Series of Dzogchen.

=== Consorts ===
Vajrasattva is often depicted with various consorts: the peaceful one being Vajragarvi, aka Vajrasatvātmikā (Tib. Dorje Nyema), Dharmadhatvishvari, Ghantapani ("Bell Bearer"), the wrathful one Diptacakra, Vajratopa, Vajrabhrikuti, and others.

== Hundred Syllable Mantra ==
An important mantra associated with Vajrasattva is the Hundred Syllable Mantra. This mantra appears in the Sarvatathāgata-tattvasaṃgraha. The earliest appearance of the mantra is in a collection of mantras (T.866) translated into Chinese by Vajrabodhi (c. 671–741) in 723 CE called A Summary of Recitations Taken from the Sarvatathāgatatattvasaṃgrahasūtra (金剛頂瑜伽中略出念誦經).

The mantra is the following:

ཨོཾ་
བཛྲ་སཏྭ་ས་མ་ཡ་མ་ནུ་པཱ་ལ་ཡ།
བཛྲ་སཏྭ་ཏྭེ་ནོ་པ་ཏིཥྛཱ།
དྲྀ་ཌྷོ་མེ་བྷ་ཝ།
སུ་ཏོ་ཥྱོ་མེ་བྷ་ཝ།
སུ་པོ་ཥྱོ་མེ་བྷ་ཝ།
ཨ་ནུ་རཀྟོ་མེ་བྷ་ཝ།
སརྦ་སིདྡྷིམྨེ་པྲ་ཡ་ཙྪ།
སརྦ་ཀརྨ་སུ་ཙ་མེ ཙིཏྟཾ་ཤཱི་ཡཾ་ཀུ་རུ་ཧཱུྃ།
ཧ་ཧ་ཧ་ཧ་ཧོཿ
བྷ་ག་ཝཱན
སརྦ ཏ་ཐཱ་ག་ཏ་བཛྲ་མ་མེ་མུཉྩ།
བཛྲི་བྷ་ཝ་མ་ཧཱ་ས་མ་ཡ་སཏྭ ཨཱཿ །།

ཧཱུྂ ཕཊ༔

Oṃ
Vajrasattva samayamanupālaya |
Vajrasattva tvenopatiṣṭha |
Dṛḍho me bhava |
Sutoṣyo me bhava |
Supoṣyo me bhava |
Anurakto me bhava |
Sarva siddhim me prayaccha |
Sarva karmasu ca
Me cittaṃ śrīyaṃ kuru hūṃ |
Ha ha ha ha hoḥ
Bhagavān
sarva tathāgata vajra mā me muñca |
Vajri bhava mahāsamaya sattva āḥ ||

唵

斡資囉 薩埵蘇 薩麻耶 麻納巴辣耶
斡資囉 薩埵諦 奴缽諦瑟劄
得哩鋤 彌發瓦
蘇度束 彌發瓦
阿奴囉屹都 彌發瓦
蘇布束 彌發瓦
薩哩斡 些提 彌 不囉耶擦
薩哩斡 葛哩麻 蘇拶
彌 稷達 釋哩楊郭嚕 吽
訶 訶 訶 訶 斛

發葛灣 薩哩瓦 答塔葛達 斡資囉 麻彌 捫拶
斡資哩 發瓦 麻訶薩摩耶 薩埵 阿

Ǎn

Wòzīluó sàduǒsū sàmáyé mánàbālàyé |
Wòzīluó sàduǒdì núbōdìsèzhā |
Délǐchú mípōwǎ |
Sūdùshù mípōwǎ |
Ānúluóyìdōu mípōwǎ |
Sūbùshù mípōwǎ |
Sàlǐwò xiētí mí bùluóyēcā |
Sàlǐwò gélǐmá sūzā |
Mí jìdá shìlǐyángguōlū hōng |
Hē hē hē hē hú |

Pōgéwān sàlǐwǎ dátǎgédá wòzīluó mámí ménzā |
Wòzīlǐ pōwǎ máhēsàmóyé sàduǒ ā |

Oṃ

O Vajrasattva honour the agreement!
Reveal yourself as the vajra-being!
Be steadfast for me!
Be very pleased for me!
Be fully nourishing for me!
Be passionate for me!
Grant me all success and attainment!
And in all actions make my mind more lucid!
hūṃ
ha ha ha ha hoḥ
O Blessed One, vajra of all those in that state, don't abandon me!
O being of the great contract be a vajra-bearer!
āḥ

=== In Chinese Buddhism ===
In Chinese Buddhism, the "Vajrasattva Hundred Syllable Mantra" (Chinese: 金剛薩埵百字明咒; pinyin: Jīngāngsàduǒ bǎizì zhòu) is recited and practiced by monastics during esoteric rituals that have tantric elements. One example is the Yujia Yankou rite (Chinese: 瑜伽焰口; pinyin: Yújiā Yànkou; lit “Yoga Flaming Mouth”), which is commonly conducted as a part of regular temple services in order to facilitate the spiritual nourishment and liberation of hungry ghosts as well as to prolong the lifespans of the living and avert disasters.

=== In Tibetan Buddhism ===
The 100-syllable mantra of Vajrasattva in Rañjana and Tibetan scripts

In Tibetan Vajrayana Buddhist practice, Vajrasattva is used in the Ngondro, or preliminary practices, in order to purify the mind's defilements, prior to undertaking more advanced tantric techniques. The yik gya, the "Hundred Syllable Mantra" (Tibetan: ཡིག་བརྒྱ་, Wylie: yig brgya) supplication of Vajrasattva, approaches universality in the various elementary Ngondro sadhana for sadhakas of all Mantrayana and Sarma schools bar the Bonpo. The pronunciation and orthography differ between lineages.

The evocation of the Hundred Syllable Vajrasattva Mantra in the Vajrayana lineage of Jigme Lingpa's (1729–1798) ngondro from the Longchen Nyingtig displays Sanskrit-Tibetan hybridization. Such textual and dialectical diglossia (Sanskrit: dvaibhāṣika) is evident from the earliest transmission of tantra into the region, where the original Sanskrit phonemes and lexical items are often orthographically rendered in the Tibetan, rather than the comparable indigenous terms (Davidson, 2002). Though Jigme Lingpa did not compose the Hundred Syllable Mantra, his scribal style bears a marked similarity to it as evidenced by his biographies (Gyatso, 1998). Jigme Lingpa as pandit, which in the Himalayan context denotes an indigenous Tibetan versed in Sanskrit, often wrote in a hybridized Sanskrit-Tibetan diglossia.

== See also ==
- Ritual purification
