= Namchö =

Namchö (Wylie: gnam chos, THL transcription: namchö) translates as the "sky/space dharma", a terma cycle especially popular among the Palyul lineage of the Nyingma school of Tibetan Buddhism. It was revealed by the tertön Namchö Mingyur Dorje, transmitted to Kunzang Sherab and compiled by the Kagyu school master Karma Chagme.

Namchö comprises an entire cycle of practices ranging from preliminary practice (ngöndro) to the "pointing out instructions" of dzogchen. While Mingyur Dorje's terma are said to have originated from his visionary encounters with deities, they also include instructions based on his own insights.

By and large they cover diverse subjects such as:

1. ritual offerings (bsang, chab gtor, bum gter);
2. funeral rites (byang chog);
3. popular empowerments for long-life (tshe dbang); health (sman lha dbang); and wealth (nor dbang);
4. thread rituals and protective amulets (mdos, srung ba);
5. rites for propitiating protector deities (chos skyong, zhing skyong, gter srung); demons (btsan / gnod sbyin / bdud); high heaven spirits (lha); mountain gods (spom ri / thang lha); nāgas (klu); and earth spirits (sa bdag);
6. divination and astrology (rde’u dkar mo / spar kha / rtsis);
7. preliminary tantric practices (sngon ’gro);
8. tantric practices (rmi lam, 'pho ba, gtum mo, phur ba, gcod) and commentaries (rgyud ’grel);
9. Pure land sādhanas (zhing khams sgrub) and hundreds of meditation practices on peaceful (zhi ba) and wrathful (khro bo) deities grouped under well-known Vajrayana cycles (chos skor), such as the Bde mchog; Gu ru drag po; Ma ning; Sgrol ma; Phag mo; and
10. Dzogchen philosophical commentaries (khrid)
