= Jianshe, Baiyü County =

Coordinates: 31°12′N 98°50′E

Jianshe 建设镇
- Town

Tibetan transcription(s)

Chinese transcription(s)
- Interactive map of Jianshe
- Country: China
- Province: Sichuan
- Prefecture: Garzê Tibetan Autonomous Prefecture
- Time zone: UTC+8 (CST)

Jianshe (simplified Chinese: 建设镇; traditional Chinese: 建設鎮; pinyin: Jiànshè Zhèn; Tibetan: འཛུགས་སྐྲུན་གྲོང་རྡལ།, Wylie: vdzugs skrun grong rdal) or Pelyul is a town and seat of Baiyü County, Garzê Tibetan Autonomous Prefecture, in the west of Sichuan Province in Southwest China.
