= Longchen Nyingthig =

Scripture in Tibetan Buddhism

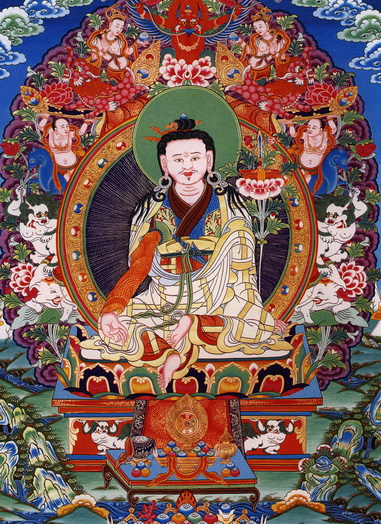
Jigme Lingpa

Longchen Nyingthig (Tibetan: ཀློང་ཆེན་སྙིང་ཐིག་, Wylie: klong chen snying thig) or Heart Essence of the Vast Expanse is a cycle of teachings revealed as Terma by Jigme Lingpa (1730–1798), after his series of visions of the teacher Longchenpa(1308–1364). It forms an important cycle of the Nyingma school of Tibetan Buddhism, that gives a systematic explanation of Dzogchen. (Note: Thondup (1999), p. xiii: "Longchen Nyingthig (the heart-essence of infinite expanse, or the ultimate truth of the universal openness) is a cycle of mystical teachings that represent the innermost meditation of Dzogpa Chenpo [Dzogchen], revealed by the great scholar and adept Jigme Lingpa (1730-1798). Jigme Lingpa discovered them as a gong ter (or 'mind treasure'), teachings that were discovered from the enlightened nature of the mind.")

== Etymology ==
Longchen Nyingthig may be translated as 'seminal heart of Longchenpa', or 'vast expanse heart essence', a reference to the central figure of Jigme Lingpa's 'pure visions' (Wylie: dag-snang) in which the texts were revealed. 'Nyingthig' (which connotes 'seminal essence' or 'heart focus'). 'Thig' is an etymon of 'thig-le' which is the Tibetan translation of the Sanskrit 'bindu', the central point of the 'mandala' (Tibetan: khorlo).

Alternate orthographies: Longchen Nyingtik.

== History and background ==
Dzogchen teachings have been classified in three sections namely: Semde (mind class/cycle); Longdé (space class/cycle); and Mengagde (direct/oral instruction class/cycle).

Shri Singha divided the Mengagde into a further four cycles: the outer, inner, esoteric, and innermost esoteric cycle. They are teachings on the "primordially pure nature" (or kadag; Wylie: ka dag). The recognition of this "primordially pure nature" is called trekchö (Wylie: khregs ch'od), "cutting through" all the grasping, clinging and apprehending which obscures the "primordially pure nature."

The 'innermost esoteric cycle' of the Mengagde is focused upon the 'spontaneous perfection of appearances' (lhündrub tögal; Wylie: lhun grub thod rgal) which is known as tögal, the 'direct approach.'

There are two principal historical redactions and elucidations given the nomenclature 'Nyingthig', namely the Vima Nyingthig brought to Tibet by Vimalamitra and the Khandro Nyingthig brought to Tibet by Padmasambhava. Into the mindstream of Jigme Lingpa merged the mindstream tributaries of Vimalamitra and King Trisong Detsen of whom he, Jigme Lingpa, was a joint 'emanation' (Tibetan: tulku) or 'embodiment' (Sanskrit: nirmanakaya). Now as was previously stated Vimalamitra brought the Vima Nyingthig to Tibet. Padmasambhava, who brought the Khandro Nyingthig to Tibet, transmitted this to King Trisong Detsen. So both the Khandro Nyingthig and the Vima Nyingthig were within the mindstream of Jigme Lingpa and were realised by him as 'mind treasure' or 'mind terma' (Wylie: dgongs-gter). Thondup & Talbott state:

Jigme Lingpa was a reincarnation of both Vimalamitra himself and King Trisong Detsen, who was a recipient of Nyingthig teachings from Guru Rinpoche (Padmasambhava) and Vimalamitra. So the Nyingthig teachings of two major lineages flowed together in Jigme Lingpa. Longchen Nyingthig is the essence or embodiment of the two Nyingthig traditions, Vima Nyingthig and Khandro Nyingthig.

== Revelation ==
Thondup and Talbott state that:

While transmitting esoteric teachings to his realized disciples in Tibet, Guru Padmasambhava concealed many teachings with the blessings of his enlightened mind stream in the nature of the intrinsic awareness of the minds of his disciples through the power of “mind-mandated transmission” (Wylie: gtad rgya); thereby the master and disciple became united as one in the teachings and realization. Here, the master has concealed the teachings and blessings, the esoteric attainments, as ter in the pure nature of the minds of his disciples through his enlightened power, and he has made aspirations that the ter may be discovered for the sake of beings when the appropriate time comes.

Thondup and Talbott state that when Jigme Lingpa was 28 years old:

In the evening of the twenty-fifth day of the tenth month of the Fire Ox year of the thirteenth Rabjung cycle (1757), he went to bed with an unbearable devotion to Guru Rinpoche in his heart; a stream of tears of sadness continuously wet his face because he was not in Guru Rinpoche’s presence, and unceasing words of prayers kept singing in his breath.

He remained in the depths of that meditation experience of clear luminosity (Wylie: 'od gsal gyi snang ba) for a long time. While being absorbed in that luminous clarity, he experienced flying a long distance through the sky while riding a white lion. He finally reached a circular path, which he thought to be the circumambulation path of Charung Khashor, now known as Bodhnath Stūpa, an important Buddhist monument of giant structure in Nepal.

== Content ==
According to Dilgo Khyentse Rinpoche, the Longchen Nyingtik "includes the preliminary and main practices, the development and completion stages, and, most important, the practice of Ati Yoga, or Dzogchen. It thus constitutes a complete path to enlightenment."

Sam van Schaik lists the contents of the major thematic sections of the Longchen Nyingthig as follows:

1. Revelation accounts and prophecy (3 texts)
2. Root tantra and root initiation (3 texts)
3. Outer guru sadhana (2 texts)
4. Inner guru sadhana (4 texts)
5. Longlife practices (4 texts)
6. Dechen gyalmo, a peaceful dakini, (28 texts)
7. Palchen Dupa, a yidam, (20 texts)
8. Secret guru sadhana (4 texts)
9. Very secret guru sadhana (1 texts)
10. Wrathful lama practice (3 texts)
11. Miscellaneous aspirational prayers (4 texts)
12. Peaceful and wrathful deities (8 texts)
13. Protectors (16 texts)
14. Transference of consciousness (phowa, 2 texts)
15. Practices on the channels and winds (tsa-lung, 6 texts)
16. Practice of cutting attachment (Chöd, 2 texts)
17. Great perfection (Dzogchen) treasure texts (4 texts)
18. Preliminary practices (ngondro, 3 texts)
19. Great perfection practice instructions (1 text)
20. Supporting instructions for the above (6 texts)
21. Additional miscellaneous texts (11 texts)

Sam van Schaik has translated some of the Dzogchen texts from the Longchen Nyingthig in "Approaching the Great Perfection" (2004). Tony Duff has also translated key texts such as "The Excellent Path to Omniscience" and "Sound of Dakini Laughter."

According to Dzigar Kongtrul Rinpoche, the Vidyadhara Jigme Lingpa founded the great Longchen Nyingtik lineage based on a series of mind treasures he discovered in visions. The teachings and practices of the Longchen Nyingtik are the swiftest path to enlightenment. One of its main sadhanas, The Gathering of Vidyadharas (Rigdzen Dupa), holds for this supreme accomplishment to happen.

== Lineage ==
The teaching descended from the Dharmakaya Buddha, from Kuntu Zangpo and Kuntu Zangmo known as Samantabhadra and Samantabhadri who formed a Sattva. The Sattva was passed to the Samboghakaya Buddha Dorje Sempa known as Vajrasattva. The Dzogchen teachings reached Guru Padmasambhava, who arrived in the mid-8th century to Tibet and converted much of the populace to Vajrayana Buddhism. The first human master of the Longchen Nyingthig lineage was Prahevajra known as Garab Dorje.

The entire cycle of teachings was discovered as terma, revealed treasures of the 18th century Nyingma teacher Kunkhyen Jigme Lingpa.

== See also ==
- Five Pure Lights
- Ganachakra
- Tantra
