= Terma (religion) =

Hidden teachings in Buddhism

Terma (Tibetan: གཏེར་མ, Wylie: gter ma; "hidden treasure") are various forms of hidden teachings that are key to the Vajrayana of Tibetan Buddhism and Bon spiritual traditions. In the Vajrayana Nyingma school tradition, two lineages occur: an oral Kama lineage and a revealed Terma lineage. Terma teachings were originally concealed by eighth-century Vajrayana masters Padmasambhava and Yeshe Tsogyal, to be discovered by treasure revealers known as tertöns, when the time was ripe. As such, the termas represent a tradition of continuous revelation in the Vajrayana of Tibetan Buddhism.

== Background ==
The terma tradition of rediscovering hidden teaching is not unique to Tibet. It has antecedents in India and cultural resonances in Hindu Vaishnavism as well.

The Vaishnava saint Chaitanya Mahaprabhu is said to have rediscovered a fragment of the Brahma Samhita in a trance state of devotional ecstasy.

There is another occasion involving Chaitanya, who deposited his divine love (prema) for the great saint Narottama Dasa in the Padma River in Bangladesh. When Narottama Dasa turned twelve years of age, he collected this treasure after a revelation in a dream.

The central Mahayana figure Nagarjuna rediscovered the last part of the "Prajnaparamita Sutra in one hundred thousand verses" in the realm of nāga, where it had been kept since the time of Gautama Buddha.

== Tibetan Buddhist tradition ==
Tradition holds that terma may be a physical object such as a text or ritual implement that is buried in the ground, hidden in a rock or crystal, secreted in a herb, or a tree, hidden in water, or hidden in the sky or in space. Though a literal understanding of terma is "hidden treasure", and sometimes refers to objects that are hidden away, the teachings associated should be understood as being concealed within the mind of the guru—that is, the true place of concealment is in the tertön's nature or essence of mind. If the concealed or encoded teaching or object is a text, it is often written in dakini script, a non-human type of code or writing that only a tertön can decipher.

Fremantle states:

...termas are not always made public right away. The conditions may not be right; people may not yet be ready for them; and further instructions may need to be revealed to clarify their meaning. Often, the tertön himself has to practice them for many years.

In this way, one may see the tradition of terma and tertön as analogous to that of inspiration and providing a legitimate cultural forum to ensure continuation of tantric tradition, and ensure Tibetan Buddhism's and Bön's continued relevancy in an evolving world.

The terma tradition is particularly prevalent in, and significant to, the Nyingma lineage. Two of the most famous 20th-century tertöns, Jigdral Yeshe Dorje (2nd Dudjom Rinpoche) and Dilgo Khyentse, were Nyingmapa. Tertön are also prevalent in Bön traditions and a few tertön are Kagyupa.

Padmasambhava and Yeshe Tsogyal and principal students secreted away and hid religious texts, ritual objects, relics, et cetera, to be discovered when conditions were ripe for the revelation of their contents. The hidden teachings also secured and protected Buddhism during the time of persecution under Langdarma. Some of these terma have been rediscovered and special terma lineages have been established throughout Tibet as a result. Out of this activity developed, especially within the Nyingma tradition, two ways of dharma transmission: the so-called "long oral transmission" from teacher to student in unbroken disciplic lineages, and the "short transmission" of terma. The foremost revealers of these terma were the Five Terton Kings and the Eight Lingpas. In the 19th century, the most famous three were the Khyen-Kong-Chok sum: Jamyang Khyentse Wangpo, Jamgon Kongtrul and Orgyen Chokgyur Lingpa.

Terma has been relayed by nāga and the dakini—of the underworld and the heavens, respectively—and has also been hidden by teachers such as the great translator Longchenpa. Sometimes terma are discovered by a master and re-concealed for a later tertön to find.

=== Types ===
Fremantle writes that according to tradition:

Termas are of two main kinds: earth treasures and intention, or mind, treasures. Teaching concealed as an intention treasure appears directly within the mind of the tertön in the form of sounds or letters to fulfill the enlightened intention of Padmakara. Earth treasures include not only texts, but also sacred images, ritual instruments, and medicinal substances, and they are found in many places: temples, monuments, statues, mountains, rocks, trees, lakes, and even the sky. In the case of texts, they are not, as one might imagine, ordinary books that can be read straightaway. Occasionally, full-length texts are found, but they are usually fragmentary, sometimes consisting of only a word or two, and they are encoded in symbolic script, which may change mysteriously and often disappears completely once it has been transcribed. They are simply the material supports that act as a trigger to help the tertön reach the subtle level of mind where the teaching has really been concealed. It is the tertön who actually composes and writes down the resulting text, and so may be considered its author.

The earth-terma are physical objects—which may be either an actual text, or physical objects that trigger a recollection of the teaching. The mind-terma are constituted by space and are placed via guru-transmission, or realizations achieved in meditation which connect the practitioner directly with the essential content of the teaching in one simultaneous experience. Once this has occurred, the tertön holds the complete teaching in mind and is required by convention to transcribe the terma twice from memory (if of textual nature) in one uninterrupted session. The transcriptions are then compared, and if no discrepancy or inconsistency is evident the terma is sealed as authentic. The tertön is required to realise the essence of the terma prior to formal transmission.

In one sense, all terma may be considered mind-termas, since the teaching associated is always inserted in the essence of the mind of the practitioner; in other words the terma is always a direct transmission from the essence of the mind of the guru towards the essence of the mind of the tertön. The terma may also be held in the mind of the tertön and realised in a future incarnation at a beneficent time. A vision of a syllable or symbol may leaven the realisation of the latent terma in the mind of the tertön. The process of hiding in the mind implies that the practitioner is to gain realisation in that life. At the time of terma concealment, a prophecy is generally made concerning the circumstances in which the teaching will be re-accessed. Especially in the case of an earth-terma, this usually includes a description of locality, and may specify certain ritual tools or objects which are required to be present, and the identities of any assistants and consorts who are required to accompany or assist the tertön.

Though somewhat contentious, the kind of revealed teaching embodied in the terma system is based in solid Mahayana Buddhist traditions. The example of Nagarjuna is often cited; the Prajnaparamita teachings are traditionally said to have been conferred on Nagarjuna by the King of the nāgas, who had been guarding them at the bottom of a lake. Similarly, the Six Treatises of Asanga are considered to have been conferred on him by the Buddha Maitreya, whom he visited in Tushita heaven during a vision.

"Pure visions" are pure teachings received from the vision of deities. These are not necessarily terma, because they do not require mindstream transmission from a guru to the practitioner experiencing the pure vision. The esoteric teachings resulting from pure vision are based on the tantras, and are sometimes considered as terma due to their merit.

=== Cycles ===
One of the most famous terma known throughout the world is the Bardo Thodol (Tibetan: བར་དོ་ཐོས་གྲོལ་, Wylie: bar do thos grol; "Liberation by Hearing in the State of Bardo"). It is popularly (but incorrectly) known as the Tibetan Book of the Dead. As a set of funerary texts and practices, it had a very specialized utility, and was revealed by Karma Lingpa, who also revealed the Zhitro teachings. Among other terma cycles are:

Major

- Longchen Nyingthig: Another well-known Dzogchen cycle of texts, revealed to tertön Jigme Lingpa in the 18th century.
- Rinchen Terdzod: Jamyang Khyentse Wangpo, Jamgon Kongtrul, and Chogyur Dechen Lingpa assembled thousands of Terma treasure texts from the Nyingma tradition all across Tibet, creating the 108 volumes of the Rinchen Terdzod.
- Jangter (Wylie: byang gter) revealed by Rigdzin Godem. Features the prominent subcycle Konchok Chidu revealed by the tertön Jatson Nyingpo and is widely practiced in Kagyu lineages as well.
- Chokling Tersar revealed by Chogyur Dechen Lingpa.

Minor

- Nam Cho (Space Treasures) transmissions and empowerments are considered the heart transmission specific to the Palyul. These teachings were revealed as terma to the 17th century Terton, Namchö Mingyur Dorje, and were expanded upon by his root teacher, Karma Chagme.
- Dudjom Tersar encompasses all the terma revelations of Dudjom Lingpa and Jigdral Yeshe Dorje (2nd Dudjom Rinpoche).

== Bön tradition ==
A terma tradition also exists in Bön. Most Bön termas were hidden during the period of decline under King Trisong Deutsen, and rediscovered around the 11th century. Teachings were hidden by masters such as Lishu Tagring and Drenpa Namkha, often inside Buddhist temples, as in Samye and Lhodrak.

=== The three Treasures ===
For the Bonpo, Gankyil denotes the three principal terma of Yungdrung Bon, the "Northern Treasure" (Wylie: byang gter), the "Central Treasure" (Wylie: dbus gter) and the "Southern Treasure" (Wylie: lho gter). The Northern Treasure is compiled from texts revealed in Zhangzhung and northern Tibet, the Southern Treasure from texts revealed in Bhutan and the southern area of Tibet, and the Central Treasure from texts revealed in central Tibet close to Samye.

=== A Cavern of Treasures ===
A Cavern of Treasures (Tibetan: མཛོད་ཕུག, Wylie: mdzod phug) is a terma uncovered by Shenchen Luga (Tibetan: གཤེན་ཆེན་ཀླུ་དགའ, Wylie: gshen chen klu dga') in the early eleventh century. Martin (n.d.: p. 21) identifies the importance of this scripture for studies of the Zhang-Zhung language:

For students of Tibetan culture in general, the mDzod phug is one of the most intriguing of all Bon scriptures, since it is the only lengthy bilingual work in Zhang-zhung and Tibetan (some of the shorter but still significant sources for Zhang-zhung are signalled in Orofino 1990.

== See also ==
- Na Nach Nachma Nachman Meuman, the "Letter from Heaven".
- Pure Land Buddhism, pure-land termas (Pureland Buddhism in Tibet)

== Notes ==
=== Works cited ===
- Fremantle, Francesca (2001). Luminous Emptiness: Understanding the Tibetan Book of the Dead. Boston: Shambhala Publications. ISBN 1-57062-450-X.
- Thondup, Tulku (1986). Hidden Teachings of Tibet: An Explanation of the Terma Tradition of the Nyingma School of Buddhism. Wisdom Publications. ISBN 0-86171-041-X.
