= Jigme Lingpa =

Nyingma Buddhist Lama (1730–1798)

Chinese name
- Chinese: 吉美林巴
- Literal meaning: Jigme Lingpa
Transcriptions
Standard Mandarin
- Hanyu Pinyin: Jíměi Línba
- Wade–Giles: Chi^{2}-mei^{3} Lin^{2}-pa
- IPA: [tɕǐ mèɪ.lǐn pá]

Alternative Chinese name
- Chinese: 仁增·吉美·林巴
- Literal meaning: Rigdzin Jigme Lingpa
Transcriptions
Standard Mandarin
- Hanyu Pinyin: Rénzēng Jíměi Línba
- Wade–Giles: Jen^{2}-tseng^{1} Chi^{2}-mei^{3} Lin^{2}-pa

Tibetan name
- Tibetan: འཇིགས་མེད་གླིང་པ།
Transcriptions
- Wylie: 'Jigs-med gling-pa

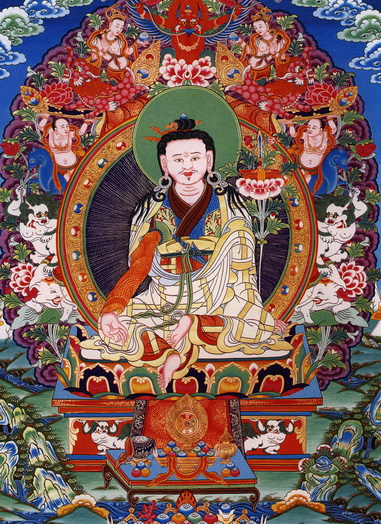

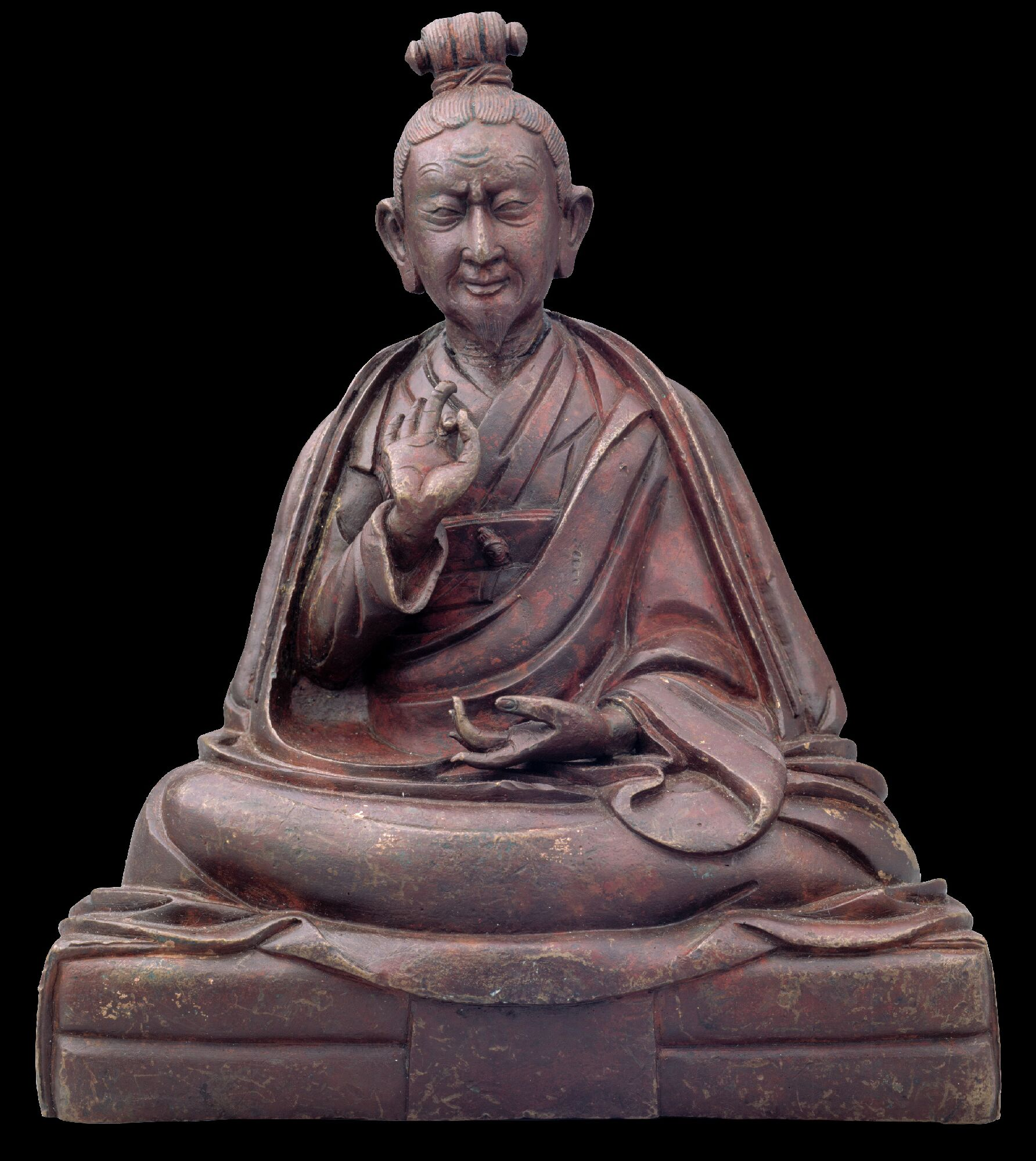
Jigme Lingpa

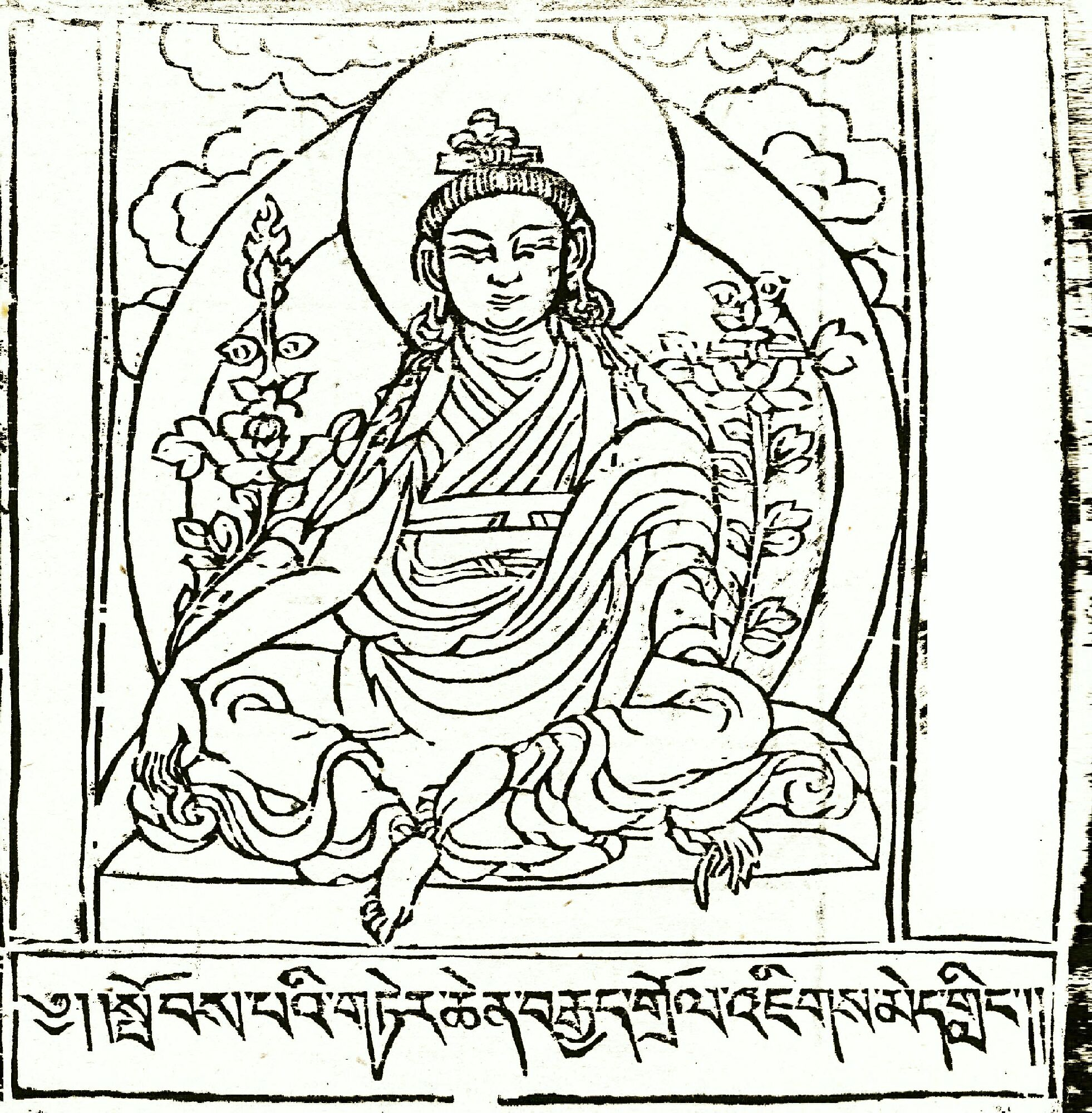
Jigme Lingpa

Jigme Lingpa (1730–1798) was a Tibetan tertön of the Nyingma lineage of Tibetan Buddhism. He was the promulgator of the Longchen Nyingthig, the Heart Essence teachings of Longchenpa, from whom, according to tradition, he received a vision in which the teachings were revealed. The Longchen Nyingthik eventually became the most famous and widely practiced cycle of Dzogchen teachings.

== Career ==
Jigme Lingpa's childhood monastery was the Nyingma school's Palri monastery, or Pelri Tekchen Ling, in Chonggye, established by Sherab Ozer.

Prefiguring Jamgon Kongtrul's creation of the Five Collections, Jigme Lingpa gathered Nyingma texts that had become rare, starting with Nyingma tantras held in the manuscript collection of the Mindrolling Monastery. This collection of the Nyingma tantras led to the amassing of the Nyingma Gyübum (Wylie: rnying ma rgyud 'bum, "Collection of Nyingma Tantras") for which Getse Mahapandita wrote the catalogue, proofread and arranged for its printing by soliciting the expensive and labour-intensive project of carving the woodblocks for the woodblock printing. The wood block carving was forded through the patronage of the royal family of Derge (Wylie: sde dge) of Kham, who favoured and honoured Jigme Lingpa. Getse Mahapandita also arranged for the printing of texts by Jigme Lingpa and Longchenpa. Getse Mahapandita proofread the works of Jigme Lingpa, Longchenpa and the Nyingma Gyübum.

Jigme also wrote a nine-volume history of the Nyingma school of Tibetan Buddhism and other works. His non-sectarian presentation of the Madhyamaka (Middle Way view) follows Je Tsongkhapa's system.

A major precursor of the Rimé movement, Jigme Lingpa had many distinguished disciples in all four lineages. The first Dodrupchen Rinpoche, Dodrupchen Jigme Trinle Ozer, became his main lineage-holder. Among those held by tradition to be Jigme Lingpa's reincarnations are Ye shes rdo rje, the Mdo mkhyen brtse ye shes rdo rje (1800–66, his mind-emanation), Patrul Rinpoche (speech-emanation) and Jamyang Khyentse Wangpo (body-emanation). In Bhutan his tradition is held by successive incarnation of the Padtselling tulku and Jikmé Kündröl Namgyel. Both Druptop Namgyel Lhündrup, 1st Padtselling Tulku (1718–1786) and Jigmé Tenpé Gyeltshen, 2nd Padtselling Tulku (1788–1850) were students of Jigme Lingpa.

Jigme Lingpa, translated by Sam van Schaik, states how his learnings commenced:

I began with the study of grammar, and whatever vajra topics I came across, such as the Conqueror’s scriptures and the treatises which clarify their intention, texts on conventional definitions and instructions on the true nature. Although I seized on them with veneration, apart from a few good imprints which inspired me to study in the brightness of day and under lamplight, I had no opportunity to increase my knowledge in a relationship with a teacher, even for a single day. Then in dPal-gyi bSam-yas mChims-phu, I met three times with the wisdom-body of Klong-chen-pa, and through being blessed with various auspicious symbols, my karmic connections were awakened from out of The Great Perfection.

Janet Gyatso states that:

Jigme Lingpa's Nyingma affiliations led sometimes to his participation in the sort of tantric activities that have long been criticized by more conservative Buddhists. He was himself ambivalent about some of these activities:...he regretted the black magic he performed during the Gurkha war. Jigme Lingpa even admits that the ancient ordinance of Lha Lama Shiwa O and Changchub O, which famously censured the indulgences of Nyingma practitioners, might have been merited. And yet he reports with a certain pleasure taking part in a drunken communal feast (gaṇacakra) or being given beer at the house of the Nyingma master Kumārarāja (1266-1343) and doing "a dance of bliss-emptiness integrated."

== Terma ==
When explaining the transmission and reception of the 'treasures' (Tibetan: terma) of 'The Words of the Omniscient One' (Wylie: kun mkhyen zhal lung) and 'The White Lotus' (Wylie: rgyab brten padma dkar po) Jigme Lingpa makes reference to an admixture of 'mindstream' (Wylie: [b]rgyud), 'Absolute [Truth]' (Wylie: don) and 'adhishthana' (Wylie: byin rlabs) and van Schaik (2004: p. 45) has rendered the Tibetan in English as follows : "the blessing of the truth-continuum" (Wylie: don brgyud byin rlabs), "the blessing of the continuum" (Wylie: rgyud byin gyi rlabs), and "the transmission-blessing of symbols and words" (Wylie: brda tshig gi byin brgyud).

=== Longchen Nyingthig ===
Jigme Lingpa is held by tradition to be the reincarnation of two important masters, Vimalamitra and King Trisong Deutsen. As the embodiment of these two figures, Tibet's two primary Dzogchen lineages were combined in him—the Vima Nyingtik and Khandro Nyingtik, both of which are contained in the Nyingtik Yapshi. Hence, the Longchen Nyingthig terma cycle is considered a condensation of these profound teachings.

The texts that were revealed by Jigme Lingpa, in their present-day form, comprise three volumes known as the Nyingtik Tsapö (Tibetan: སྙིང་ཐིག་རྩ་པོད). The numerous treatises, sadhanas and prayers it contains deal primarily with tantric practice, in particular the generation stage and Dzogchen.

Jigme Lingpa discovered the Longchen Nyingtik teachings as mind terma at the age of twenty-eight. Tulku Thondup writes:

In the evening of the twenty-fifth day of the tenth month of the Fire Ox year of the thirteenth Rabjung cycle (1757), Jikmé Lingpa went to bed with an unbearable devotion to Guru Rinpoche in his heart; a stream of tears of sadness continuously wet his face because he was not in Guru Rinpoche’s presence, and unceasing words of prayers kept singing in his breath.

He remained in the depths of that meditation experience of clear luminosity for a long time. While being absorbed in that luminous clarity, he experienced flying a long distance through the sky while riding a white lion. He finally reached a circular path, which he thought to be the circumambulation path of Jarung Khashor, now known as Boudhanath Stupa, an important Buddhist monument of giant structure in Nepal.

In this vision, the wisdom dakinis gave Jikmé Lingpa a casket containing five yellow scrolls and seven crystal beads. One of the scrolls contained the prophetic guide of Longchen Nyingtik, called Nechang Thukkyi Drombu. At the instruction of a dakini, he ate the yellow scrolls and crystal beads, and all the words and meaning of the Longchen Nyingtik terma were awakened in his mind.

Jigme Lingpa kept this terma secret for years, and he did not even transcribe the terma until he entered another retreat in which he had a series of visions of Longchen Rabjam. Tulku Thondup explains:

In the earth-hare year (1759) he started another three-year retreat at Chimpu. During that retreat, because he was inspired by three successive pure visions of Longchen Rabjam, and he was urged by repeated requests of dakinis, he transcribed his terma as the cycle of Longchen Nyingtik. On the tenth day of the sixth month (monkey month) of the monkey year (1764) he made his terma public for the first time by conferring the transmission of empowerment and the instructions upon fifteen disciples.

=== Sadhanas ===
==== Chöd ====
The Loud Laugh of the Dakini (Tibetan: མཁའ་འགྲོའི་གད་རྒྱངས, THL: Khandrö Gé Gyang) is a Chöd sādhanā from the Longchen Nyingtik.

== Animal welfare ==
Jigme Lingpa was concerned about animal welfare and criticized meat as a sinful food incompatible with a compassionate mindset but did not personally adopt a vegetarian diet due to practical difficulties, nor did he mandate a vegetarian diet among his students. Instead, Jigme Lingpa prescribed prayers to purify the consumer who had eaten meat as he believed that prayers could create a positive karma connection between the animal and the consumer, helping the animal achieve a better rebirth. Historian Geoffrey Barstow has described Jigme Lingpa as offering his "students a chance to continue cultivating compassion without having to completely abandon meat".

== Autobiography ==
Jigme Lingpa is also known for his autobiographical works, primarily his outer autobiographies found in his nine-volume "Collected Works" alongside his "Heart Sphere" cycle and other historical works. Most notably, his autobiographical works showed the dynamics of relationships between Tibetan Buddhist visionaries and lay political figures.

== Works in translation ==
- Lingpa, Jigme (1987). The Dzogchen: Innermost Essence Preliminary Practice. Translated by Tulku Thondup (2nd rev. ed.). Paljor Publications. ISBN 81-85102-19-8.
- Lingpa, Jigme; Dorje, Longchen Yeshe (2010). Treasury of Precious Qualities: Book One. Translated by The Padmakara Translation Group. Shambhala. ISBN 978-0-8348-2310-5.
- Lingpa, Jigme (2017). "The Casket of Siddhis: A Recitation Manual for Rigdzin Dupa". The Gathering of Vidyadharas: Text and Commentaries on the Rigdzin Düpa. Snow Lion. ISBN 978-1-61180-361-7.
- Lingpa, Jigme (2017). "The Crucial Points of Visualization for the Rigdzin Dupa Long-Life Practice". The Gathering of Vidyadharas: Text and Commentaries on the Rigdzin Düpa. Snow Lion. ISBN 978-1-61180-361-7.
- Lingpa, Jigme (2017). "Prayer to Rigdzin Ligme Lingpa Invoking His Previous Incarnations". The Gathering of Vidyadharas: Text and Commentaries on the Rigdzin Düpa. Snow Lion. ISBN 978-1-61180-361-7.
- Lingpa, Jigme (2018). "The Steps to Liberation: Essential Instructions on the Common Preliminary Practice of the Sevenfold Mind Training". Steps to the Great Perfection: The Mind-Training Tradition of the Dzogchen Masters. Snow Lion. ISBN 978-1-55939-477-2.
- Lingpa, Jigme (2020). "Ladder to Akanistha: Instructions on the Development Stage and Deity Yoga and Clarifying the Difficult Points in the Development Stage and Deity Yoga". Deity, Mantra, and Wisdom: Development Stage Meditation in Tibetan Buddhist Tantra. Shambhala. ISBN 978-1-55939-497-0.
- Lingpa, Jigme; Dorje, Longchen Yeshe (2020). Treasury of Precious Qualities: Book Two. Translated by The Padmakara Translation Group. Shambhala. ISBN 978-1-61180-099-9.

== See also ==
- Phowa
