= Karma Chagme =

Tibetan Buddhist lama and tulku lineage

The name Karma Chagme refers to a 17th-century Tibetan Buddhist (Vajrayāna) lama and to the tülku (reincarnate lama) lineage which he initiated. Including the first, seven Karma Chagme tülkus have been recognized. The Neydo Kagyu (Wylie: gnas mdo bka' brgyud) sub-school of the Karma Kagyu was established by the first Karma Chagme, Rāga Asya.

== First Karma Chagme, Rāga Asya ==
Karma Chakme (born Wangdrak Sung; ordained Karma chags med; alias Rā-ga a-sya; 1613-1678) was born in Salmo Gang (Wylie: zal mo sgang), a place near Riwoche (Wylie: ri bo che) in the district of Ngoms in Kham. His father, Pema Wangdrak (Wylie: pad-ma dbang-grags) was an established tantric siddha from the ruling lineage of Dong khachö (Wylie: gdong mkha' spyod) and his mother Chökyong Kyi (Wylie: 'Chos-skyong skyid) was descended from the family line of Gyuli. Said to have been the reincarnation of Chokro Lü Gyeltsen (Wylie: cog ro klu'i rgyal mtshan) and of Prince Sad na legs, his father gave his son the tertön Ratna Lingpa longevity empowerments during his birth.

Karma Chakme was trained by his father from the age of six in reading and writing, as well as “white” and “black” astrology (Wylie: rtsis dkar nag), geomancy and magic ceremonies for the purpose of averting misfortunes. He was also taught the entire cycle of Nyingma teachings, which he had learned from his father, and continued his training with the most famous Nyingma and Kagyu masters of his time.

He attained mastery of the sūtras and tantras at zad ma gyi monastery and received, at the age of twenty, ordination and the transmission of Mahamudra from the 6th Shamar Rinpoche Mipan Chökyi Wangchuk (1584-1630) at Tsurphu Monastery. He received empowerment during his visit. Then he traveled with the Karmapa for a year and a half achieving fame in Tibet. Karma Chakme's public examination was before 12,000 monks at the Great Prayer Festival of Karma Kagyu.

A contender for the post of 10th Karmapa, he was not confirmed but retained the ordination name Karma Chakme.

He was known for being a prolific writer and scholar, for his ardent devotion to the cult of Sukhāvatī and for being the teacher of tertön Namchö Mingyur Dorje, who revealed a unique cycle of terma known as the Nam Cho (Wylie: gnam-chos). Karma Chakme was credited as a mahasiddha attaining an authentic emanation of Jinasagara, the "Red Avalokiteśvara". Karma Chags med was a formidable scholar and prolific author who composed some sixty volumes of texts on a variety of subjects while in retreat. He is perhaps best-known for his contributions to the Tibetan genre of Pure Land literature, with his Aspiration Prayer to the Pure Land Sukhāvatī and its commentary which are widely considered classic texts of the demön(bde smom) genre. Among his many works belonging to the Nam Cho cycle, The Mind Treasure of the Sky Dharma: A Compilation of Extensive Instructions for Transferring to Sukhāvatī (Gnam chos thugs kyi gter kha las bde chen zhing du 'pho ba'i gdams pa rgyas par bsgrigs pa) is an important commentary on the Vajrayāna practice of phowa

The biography of the first Karma Chakme is based on the following sources: gTer ston brgya rtsa’i rnam thar (513-16); mKhas grub Karma chags med rin po che’i gsung ’bum gyi dkar chag (introduction); Tsering Lama (1988: 35-44); and Chagmé (1998: 7-11).

== Most recent (7th) Karma Chagme ==
The most recent Nédo (Wylie: gnas mdo) throne holder of Tashi Chöeling Monastery (Wylie: bkra shis chos gling dgon pa) was Karma Tendzin Trinlé Künkhyap Pelzangpo (Wylie: kar ma bstan 'dzin 'phrin las kun khyab dpal bzang po). His seat was Néydo Tashi Chöeling Monastery in Setidevi Bhanjyang, Nepal, which is near Pharping, a Buddhist pilgrimage site in the Kathmandu Valley. Rinpoche died on 3 October 2013, attended by Ogyen Trinley Dorje the 17th Gyalwa Karmapa and Dragpa Tenpa Yarpel the 12th Goshir Gyaltsab Rinpoche. The 8th Karma Chagme Rinpoche has not yet been identified.

== Karma Chagme tülku lineage ==
1. Karma Chagme Raga Asya (Wylie: karma chags-med rā-ga a-sya; 1613-1678)
2. Choktrül Trinley Wangchuk (Wylie: mchog-sprul ’phrin-las dbang-phyug)
3. Trinley Tendzin (Wylie: ’phrin-las bstan-’dzin)
4. Khyapdak Tendzin Trinley (Wylie: khyab-bdag bstan-’dzin ’phrin-las)
5. Sang Ngak Tendzin (Wylie: gSang-sngags bstan-’dzin)
6. Karma Tsultrim Namgyal (Wylie: karma tshul-khrims rnam-rgyal)
7. Karma Tendzin Trinley Kunkhyab Pal Zangbo (Wylie: karma bstan-’dzin ’phrin-las kun-khyab dpal-bzang-po; 1926-2013)
