= Namkhai =

Namkhai is a Tibetan name. Notable bearers include:

- Namkhai Norbu (1938–2018), Tibetan Buddhist master and university professor
  - Yeshi Silvano Namkhai (born 1970), Italian Buddhist master, Namkhai Norbu's son
- Namkhai Nyingpo (8th/9th century), Tibetan Buddhist master, disciple of Padmasambhava
