= Nubchen Sangye Yeshe =

One of the twenty-five principal students of Guru Padmasambhava

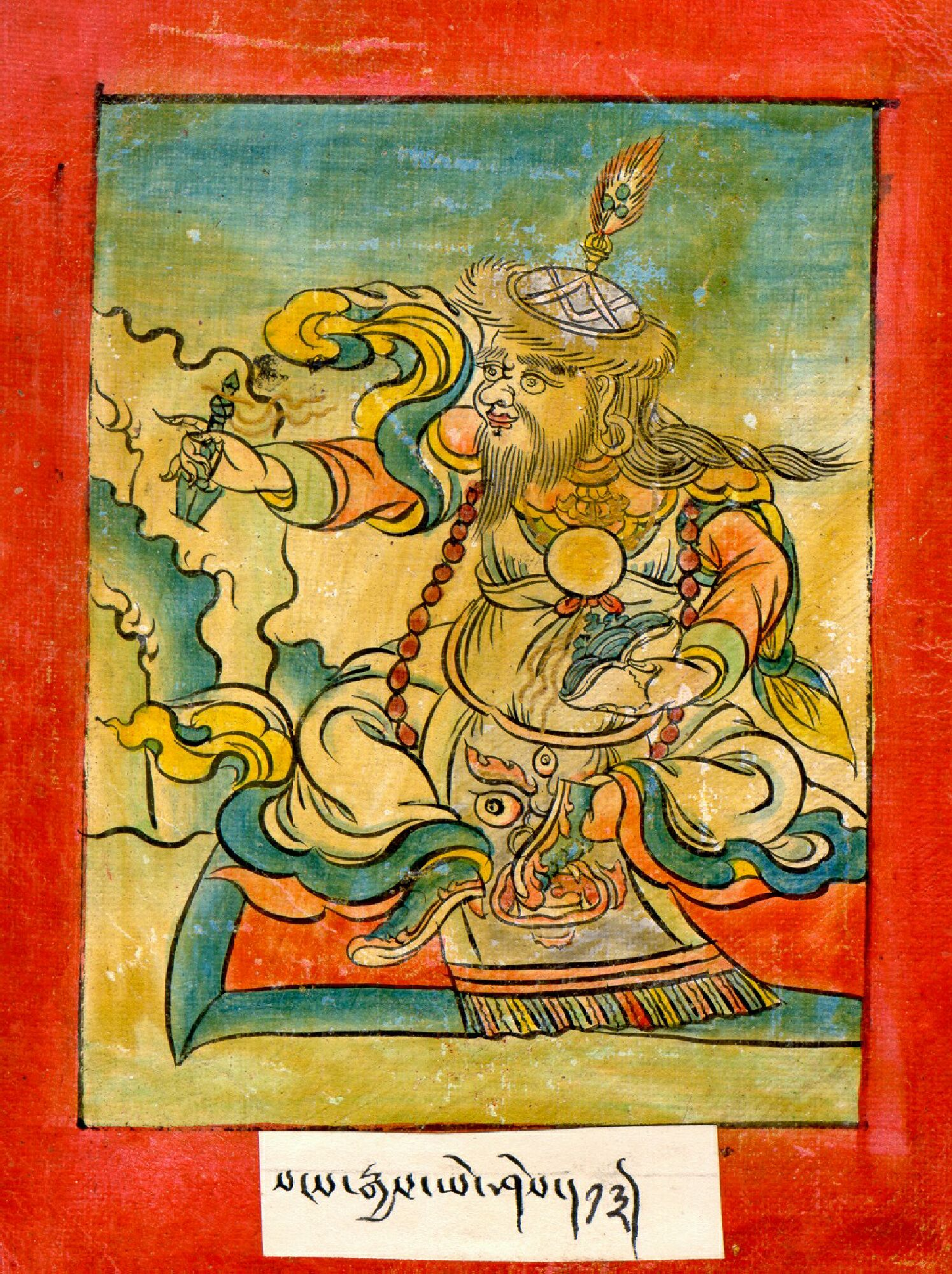
- Tibetan illustration of Nubchen
- Known for: Early scholar and systematizer of Dzogchen

Nubchen Sangye Yeshe (Tib:གནུབས་ཆེན་སངས་རྒྱས་ཡེ་ཤེས, Wylie: gnubs chen sangs rgyas ye shes, Chinese: 努千桑傑耶喜, Pinyin: Nǔqiān Sāngjié Yéxǐ) (9th century) was one of the twenty-five principal students of Guru Padmasambhava, revealer of Vajrayana and founder of the Nyingma school and of Tibetan Buddhism. Nubchen Sangye Yeshe is considered an important figure in the development of the White Sangha of lay yogis, the Ngakpas and Ngakmas. Crazy wisdom Terton Tsasum Lingpa (17th century) was a reincarnation of Nubchen Sangye Yeshe.

== Teachers ==
As well as his fame as one of the 25 principal disciples of Padmasambhava, Nubchen Sangye Yeshe is held in different sources to have been a direct disciple of Shri Simha, Vimalamitra, Kamalashila, Dhanadhala, Tshaktung Nagpo, Shantigarbha, Dhanasamskrita, Shakyadeva, Dhanarakshita, the Brahman Prakashalamkara, Dharmabodhi, Dharmaraja, Tsuglag Pelge, Acarya Vasudhara, Chetsenkye, Nak Jñanakumara, Sogdian Pelgi Yeshe and Gyelwei Yönten.

== Works ==
Nubchen Sangye Yeshe wrote the Armor Against Darkness (Wylie: mun pa’i go cha), a major commentary on The Six Tantras Clarifying the Six Limits (dgongs pa ’dus pa’i mdo), which is a central tantra of the Anuyoga tradition.

Namkhai Norbu also identifies Nubchen Sangye Yeshe as the author of a treatise, Samten Migdrön (bsam gtan mig sgron). Nyingma scholar Khenchen Palden Sherab Rinpoche has written the primary commentary on Nubchen Sangye Yeshe's Samten Migdron.

Jacob Dalton states that:

Nubchen Sanggyé Yeshé is renowned for having preserved a number of tantric lineages through the so-called “dark period” of Tibetan history (roughly 842-978 CE), when state-supported monastic Buddhism fell into decline. Nubchen authored many works, including the Lamp for the Eye in Contemplation (bsam gtan mig sgron), an extensive discussion of early Tibetan contemplative systems. But by far his longest work is his little read Armor Against Darkness (mun pa’i go cha), a systematic commentary on the Compendium of the Intentions Sūtra. In preparing his commentary, Nubchen studied directly under Chetsenkye and the other translators of the Compendium Sūtra.

Eva Dargyay discusses the particular generation stage cycle of the 'Eight Pronouncements' (Wylie: bka'-brgyad) that Nubchen was empowered to practice by Padmasambhava and through the realisation of which Nubchen accomplished the specific emanation of this Manjushri 'yidam' (Wylie: lha), mandala of divine accoutrements and entourage and demonstrated his siddhi by deftly wielding the energetic phurba:

Sangs-rgyas-ye-śes practiced the gŚin-rje-snying-thig, the divine power (lha) of which is Mañjuśri; as a sign of successful meditation, he thrust a ceremonial dagger (phur-bu) into a rock.

=== Lamp for the Eye in Contemplation the Samten Migdron (Tib. bSam-gtan Mig-sgron.) ===
Elias Capriles, in discussing the 'Lamp for the Eye in Contemplation' the Samten Migdrön discovered in 1908 at Tun-huang by Paul Pelliot, states:

...this book was entombed in the ruins of Tun-huang, where it remained from the eleventh or twelfth century CE until 1908, when French Sinologist Paul Pelliot explored the cave temples that a local farmer discovered accidentally at the turn of the twentieth century. Therefore, its authenticity is beyond question.

In the Samten Migdrön, Nubchen Sangye Yeshe establishes a distinction within the Mahayana between:

- the 'Gradual Vehicle of Bodhisattvas' (Sanskrit: Bodhisattvayana); and
- the 'Sudden Mahayana' corresponding to the Dhyana, Ch’an or Zen school.

The 'suddenness' is further explicated and contextualised by Capriles, who mentions Huineng:

In his sutra, Hui-neng noted that no tradition is sudden or gradual, and that these adjectives should be applied to students rather than to teachings or schools, for no doubt some students are more “sudden” than others (Wong Mou-Lam and A. F. Price, translators, 1969); however, the term is used to refer to the Ch’an or Zen School insofar as in it Awakening is not posited as the result of a gradual development through paths and levels, but as an instantaneous breakthrough.

For 'instantaneous breakthrough' and 'awakening' refer kensho (Japanese) and satori (Japanese), respectively.

==== English translations ====
- Esler, Dylan (2023). The Lamp for the Eye of Contemplation. Oxford University Press. ISBN 978-0-19-760990-3.

== See also ==
- Dream yoga
- Kathok Monastery
- Mahāmāyā Tantra
- Namkhai Nyingpo
