= Padma Gyalpo =

In Tibetan Buddhism, Padma Gyalpo (or Pema Gyalpo) is one of the Guru Rinpoche's eight manifestations and appears in the form of a young prince. Pema Gyalpo means Lotus King. Padma Gyalpo is first of the Guru Rinpoche's Eight Manifestation, and is the form in which Guru Rinpoche took birth.

== Birth ==
According to Tibetan historical account, Guru Rinpoche was born just four years after the historical Buddha's Mahaparinirvana on the Wood Monkey year in the monkey month in a kingdom known as Oddiyana. In Tibetan calendar, monkey years are considered Guru Rinpoche years.

Oddiyana may have been located somewhere in today's Pakistan in Swat Valley and at the time it was ruled by King Indrabhuti. According to the legend, the king had a vision in a dream where a five-pointed golden Vajra came very close to him, while there was sun and moon both rising in the eastern sky as an omen predicting Guru Rinpoche's birth. The next day he saw Padma Gyalpo in form of an eight-year-old boy.

When Padmasambhava (Guru Rinpoche) was born in the form of Padma Gyalpo, he already had the appearance of an eight-year-old. It is typical that great saints in the Tibetan Buddhist cultural context had a "miraculous birth" as in to add to the devotion Tibetans could have to a meditation Master such as Padmasambhava. Chogyam Trungpa Rinpoche explains in Crazy Wisdom:

"He was inquisitive, bright, youthful, untouched by anything. Since he had never been touched by anything, he was not afraid to touch anything. He was surrounded by dakinis making offerings to him and playing music."

According to Trungpa Rinpoche, in his birth form, Padma Gyalpo, Padmasambhava represents the childlike state of no duality, a state where there is no "this" or "that", a state of freshness. Because there is no dualistic reference point, there is also no any kind of concept.
