= Vajrakilaya =

Tibetan Buddhist wrathful deity

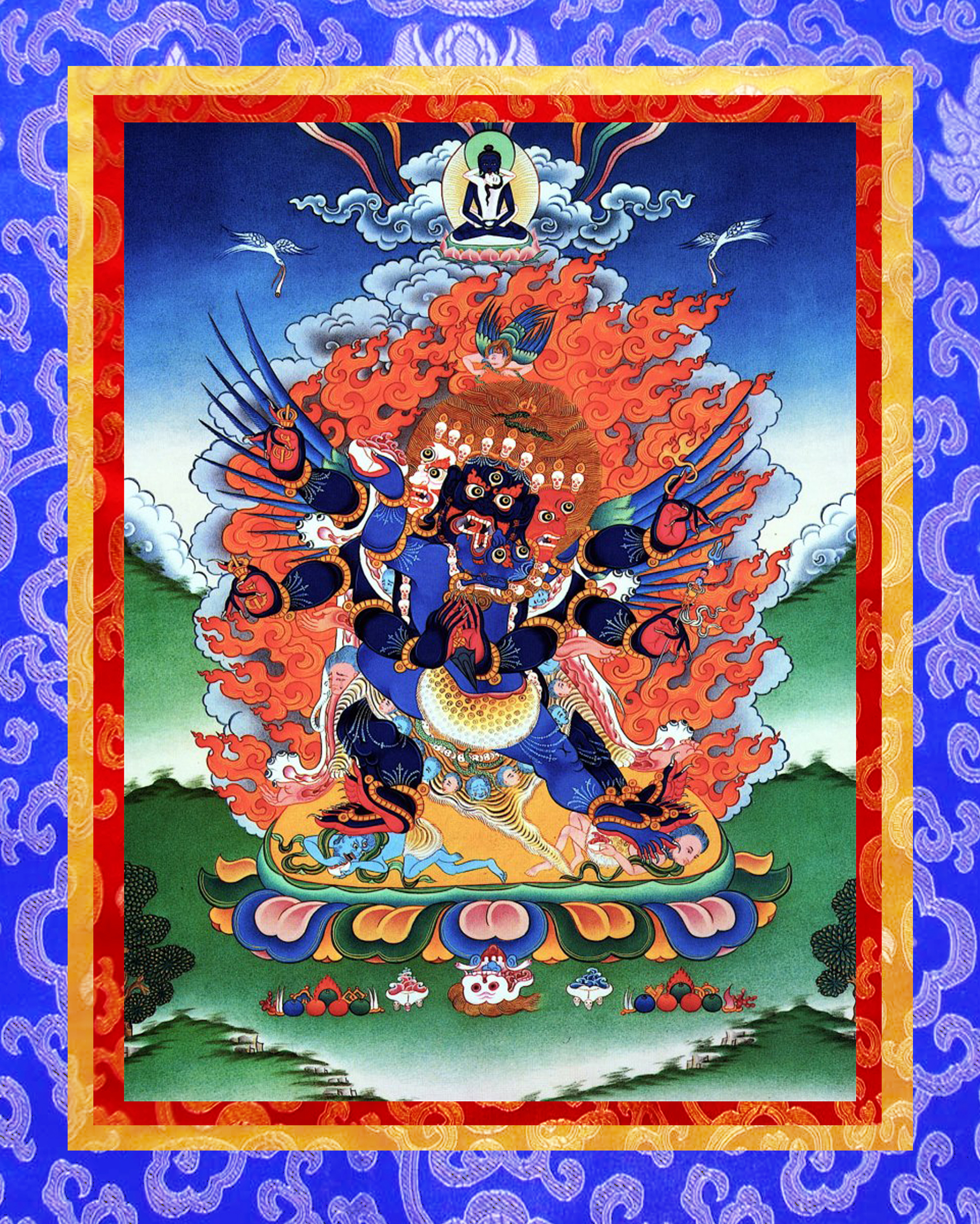
Vajrakilaya (dark blue) with consort Diptachakra (light blue). Two demons lie crushed under his feet

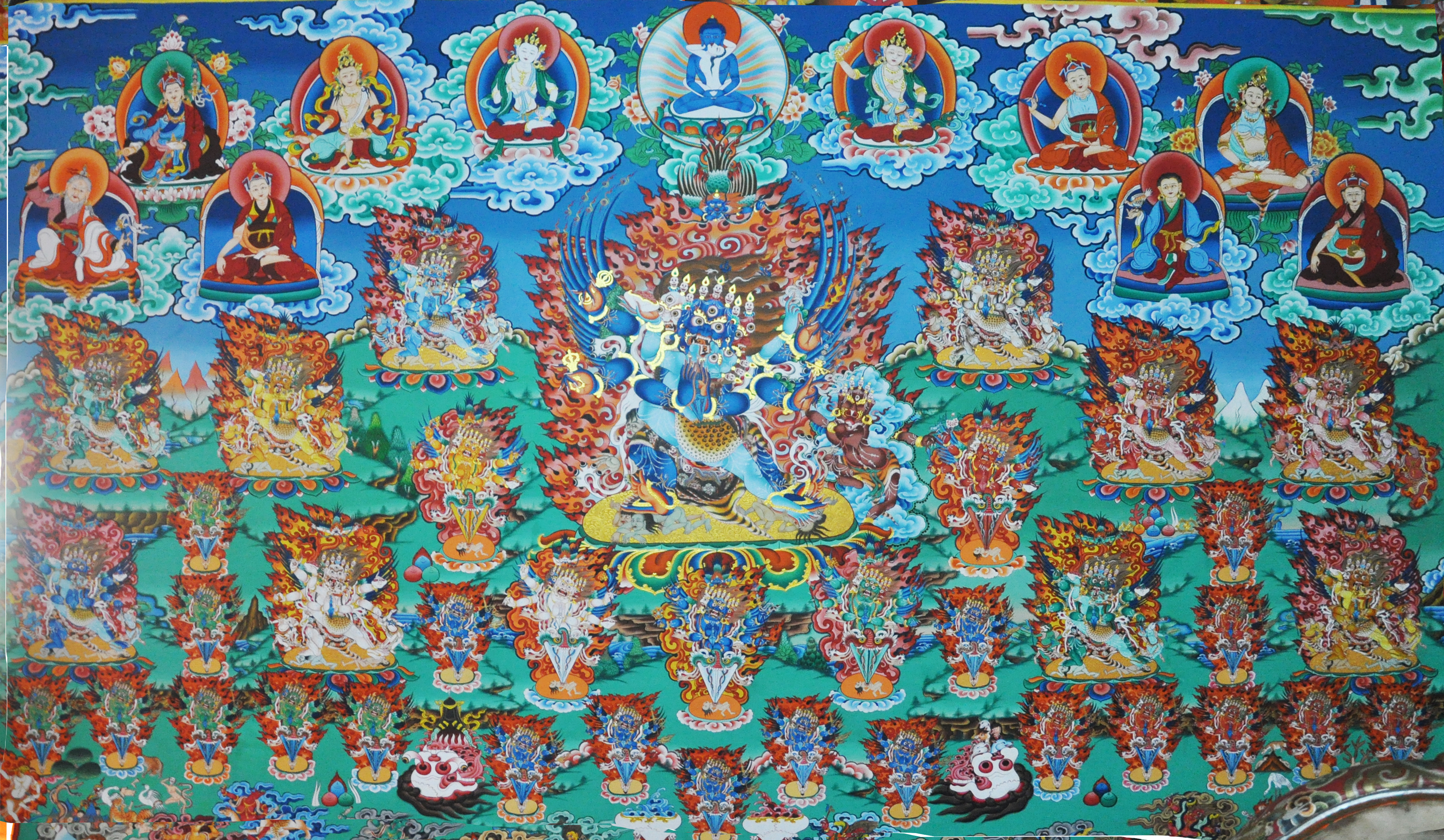
Painting on the wall of Gaden Tharpa Choorling Gompha, Monastery at Kalimpong, West Bengal, India

In Tibetan Buddhism, Vajrakilaya (Sanskrit: वज्रकीलाय, romanized: Vajrakīlāya, lit. 'Diamond-dagger', also वज्रकील, Vajrakīla; Tibetan: རྡོ་རྗེ་ཕུར་པ, Wylie: rdo rje phur pa, THL: Dorje Phurba) or Vajrakumara (Sanskrit: वज्रकुमार, romanized: Vajrakumāra, lit. 'Diamond-youth'; Tibetan: རྡོ་རྗེ་གཞོན་ནུ, Wylie: rdo rje gzhon nu, THL: Dorje Shönnu) is a wrathful heruka yidam deity who embodies the enlightened activity of all the Buddhas. His practice is known for being the most powerful for removing obstacles and destroying the forces hostile to compassion. Vajrakilaya is one of the eight deities of Kagyé.

Vajrakilaya is a wrathful form of the Buddha Vajrasattva. His distinctive iconographic trait is that he holds the dagger called phurba or kīla. Vajrakilaya is commonly represented with three faces of different colors in a crown of skulls. The central face is blue, the left is red and the right is white. He also has six arms: two hold the phurba, two hold one vajra each, one holds a flaming snare, and one a trident. He crushes under his feet demons representing the obstacles to spiritual realization.

== As deity ==
Vajrakilaya is a significant Vajrayana deity who transmutes and transcends obstacles and obscurations. Padmasambhava achieved realisation through practicing Yangdag Heruka (Tibetan: yang dag he ru ka), but only after combining it with the practice of Vajrakilaya to clean and clear obstacles and obscurations.

Vajrakilaya is also understood as the embodiment of activities of the Buddha mind. According to Dilgo Khyentse Rinpoche, Vajrakilaya is perceived as the wrathful form of Vajrapani. Many great masters both in India and Tibet, but especially in Tibet, have practiced Vajrakilaya (especially in the Nyingma lineage, and among the Kagyu and also within the Sakya). The Sakya's main deity, besides Hevajra, is Vajrakilaya.

Jamyang Khyentse Wangpo, Dilgo Khyentse Rinpoche, Dudjom Rinpoche and a significant number of lamas within the Kagyu and Nyingma engaged Vajrakilaya sadhana.

== Iconography ==
A common manifestation of Vajrakilaya has three heads, six arms, and four legs. Vajrakilaya's three right hands except for the right front one held vajras with five and nine prongs. The right front one makes a mudra as granting boons with open palm. Vajrakilaya's three left hands hold a flaming triple wishfulfilling jewel or triratna, a trident and the phurba. Vajrakilaya's back is covered by the freshly flayed skin of the elephant representing 'ignorance' (Sanskrit: avidya; Tibetan: marigpa), with the legs tied in front. A human skin is tied diagonally across his chest with the hands lying flat on Vajrakilaya's stomach and solar plexus.

A rope ripples over his body with severed heads hanging by their hair representing the Akshamala or 'garland of bija' (Sanskrit: Varnamala). A knee length loin cloth winds around his belly belted with a tiger skin complete with tail, claws and head. This deity wears manifold nāga adornments and jewellery: naga earrings, naga bracelets, naga anklets and a naga cord over his chest, sometimes referred to as a naga girdle and a naga hairpiece or hair ornament.

Vajrakilaya is the deity of the magic thunderbolt, the phurba, a tool of the sharp adamantine point of Dharmakaya, a wisdom forced through the power of one-pointed concentration. This 'one-pointed' (Sanskrit: eka graha) focus is a concerted mindfulness on the unity and interdependence of all dharmas. This one-pointed focus is understood as 'applying oneself fully' (Tibetan: sgrim pa). The three pointed blade represents delusion, attachment and aversion transformation.

== History of practice in India and Tibet ==
Although at one point the Indic origin of kīla practice was widely questioned, Boord claims that "the existence of a Kīla cult among the Buddhists in eighth century India...must now surely be accepted as established" and further claims that it has been "conclusively demonstrated that all the basic doctrines and rituals of Vajrakīla had their origin in India." Robert Mayer, one of the leading scholars of the kīla literature, shares the same view, writing that prior research had been plagued by "elementary misunderstandings" based on a lack of familiarity with crucial Indic primary sources. Mayer says of Boord's work, "our understandings of the deity are quite similar" insofar as both do not doubt that "the phur-pa and the deity are Indic."

Tibetan tradition, which Boord credits as generally credible, holds that the entire corpus of Indian kīla lore was systematized by Padmasambhava, Vimalamitra, and the Nepali Śīlamañju, while on retreat together at Yang-le-shod (present-day Pharping, Nepal). According to Boord, "it was precisely during this retreat that the many strands of kila lore were finally woven together into a coherent masterpiece of tantric Buddhism and thus it helps to illuminate the process by which tantric methods were being related to soteriology at this time. Beautifully codified in terms of both theory and practice, this divine scheme of meditation and magic was subsequently transmitted to Tibet and became established there as one of the major modes of religious engagement. So much so, in fact, that many previous writers on Tibet have actually assumed the kila cult to be of Tibetan origin."

Renowned Tibetologist and Buddhologist Herbert Guenther concurred in a review of Boord's work, concluding that his "careful research of all available texts relevant to the study of this figure" was "much needed and long overdue" in correcting longstanding "misrepresentation of historical facts."

Beer conveys the entwined relationship of Vajrakilaya with Samye, the propagation of Secret Mantra in Tibet, and the importance of the sadhana to both Padmasambhava's enlightenment, and his twenty-five 'heart disciples', who are of the mindstreams of the principal terton (according to Nyingma tradition):

In the biography of Padmasambhava it is recorded that he travelled to the northern land of Kashakamala, where the cult of the kīla prevailed. Later, whilst meditating on the deity Yangdak Heruka (Skt. Vishuddha Heruka) in the 'Asura Cave' at Parping in the Kathmandu valley, he experienced many obstructions from the maras, and in order to subjugate them he request the Kīla Vitotama Tantras to be brought from India. Having established the first Tibetan monastery at Samye, the first transmission that Padmasambhava gave to his 25 'heart disciples', in order to eliminate the hindrances to the propagation of the buddhadharma in Tibet, were the teachings of the Vajrakilaya Tantra. From its early Nyingma origins the practice of Vajrakilaya as a yidam deity with the power to cut through any obstructions was absorbed into all schools of Tibetan Buddhism.

There are a number of terma teachings founded on Vajrakilaya. For instance, there are treasure teachings from Jigme Lingpa, Ratna Lingpa and Nyang-rel Nyima Ozer.

== In Bon ==
Contemporary Bon has "at least nine traditions of Phur pa," according to one scholar.
