= Kawa Paltsek =

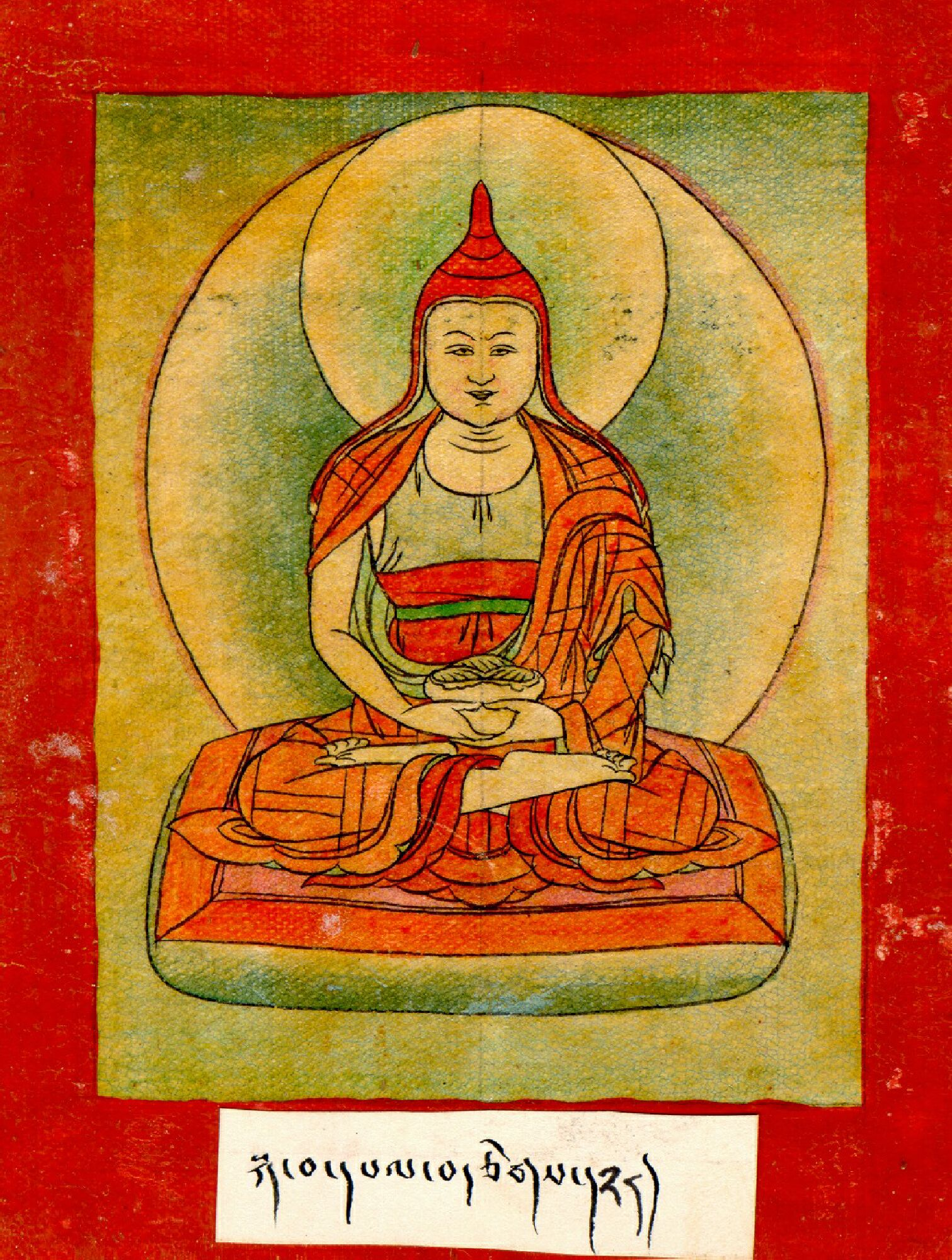
Kawa Paltseg

Kawa Paltseg (Tibetan: སྐ་བ་དཔལ་བརྩེགས, Wylie: ska ba dpal brtsegs, alternate spelling Kawa Peltseg) was one of the twenty-five disciples of Guru Rinpoche (Padmasambhava) during the Tibetan Empire period. He was born in Kawa in Phenpo Valley. He was one of the seven monks ordained by the great abbot Śāntarakṣita (Shantarakshita) and became one of the greatest Tibetan translators in accordance with a prophecy by Guru Rinpoche. He was one of the most important contributors to the translation of the Tibetan Tripitaka and the Nyingma Gyübum. "Kawa" is a place name and "Paltseg" means "Mountain of resplendence."

He along with Chok-Ro Lui Gyaltsen and Zhang Yeshe De created the bilingual Mahavyutpatti.

== See also ==
Nyingma lineage
