= Rinchen Chok of Ma =

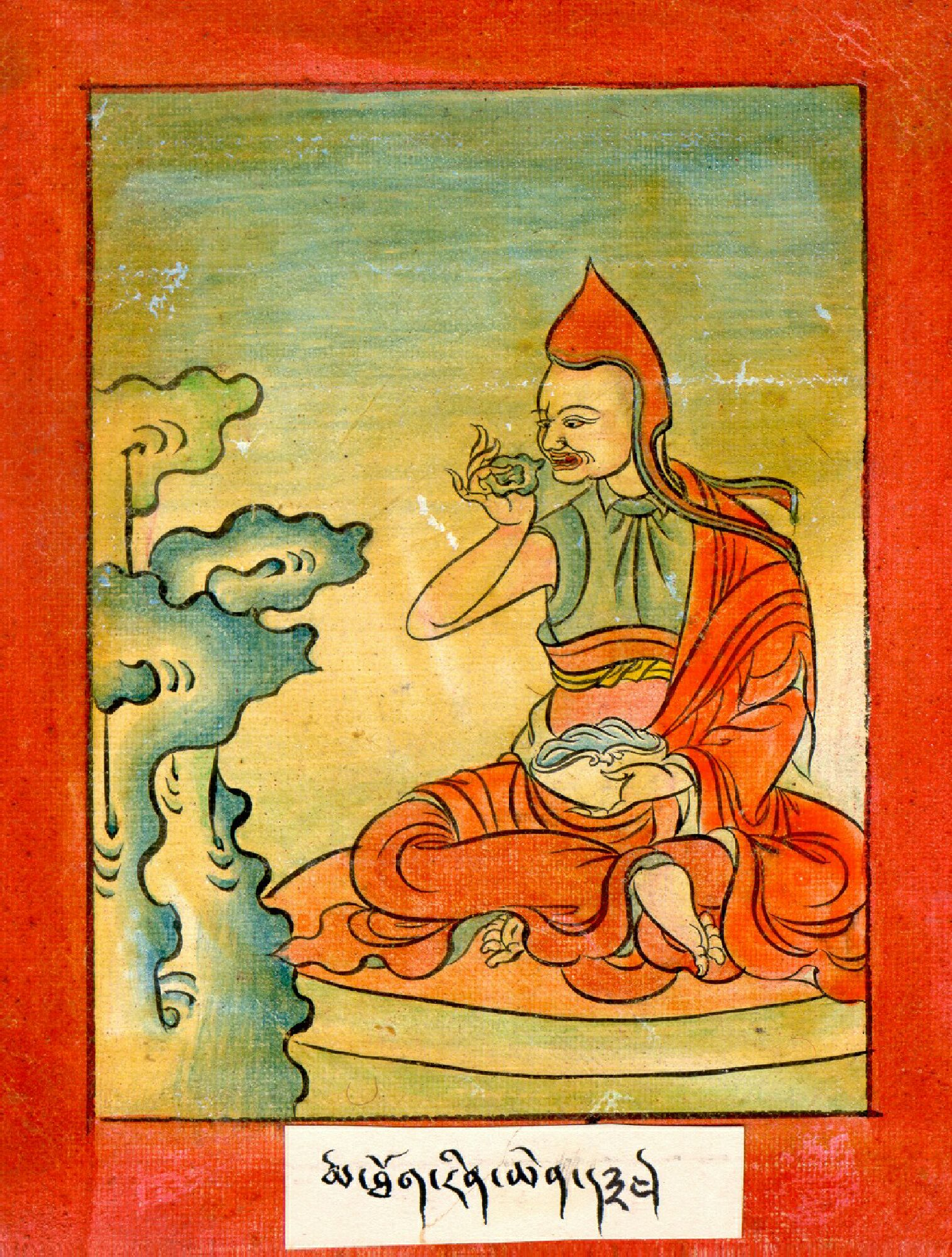

Ma Rinchen Chok (Tibetan: རྨ་རིན་ཆེན་མཆོག, Wylie: rma rin chen mchog), is numbered as one of the twenty-five principal disciples of Padmasambhava. Rinchen Chok was also a senior disciple of Vimalamitra. Rinchen Chok was an important lotsawa in the first wave of translations and was one of the first seven monks ever to be ordained in Tibet by Shantarakshita, known as the 'seven men who were tested' (Tibetan: སད་མི་མི་བདུན, Wylie: sad mi mi bdun). The ordination lineage was Sarvastivadin.

== Iconography ==
In his hagiography Ma Rinchen Chok as a result of his empowerments is held to have gained the siddhi of being able to crush and eat rocks and boulders for food and him doing so is a standard aspect of his iconography.

== Translations ==
'Eight Sections of the Magical Net' (Tibetan: སྒྱུ་འཕྲུལ་སྡེ་བརྒྱད, Wylie: sgyu 'phrul sde brgyad) which form the cycle of Mahayoga texts associated with the 'Magical Net of Vajrasattva' (Tibetan: སྒྱུ་འཕྲུལ་རྡོ་རྗེ་སེམས་དཔཱ, Wylie: sgyu 'phrul rdo rje sems dpa'), the 'Secret Nucleus' (Tibetan: སྒྱུ་འཕྲུལ་གསང་བ་སྙིང་པོ, Wylie: sgyu 'phrul gsang ba snying po) which is the root of the 'Eighteen Great Tantrapitaka' (Tibetan: རྒྱུད་སྡེ་ཆེན་པོ་བཅོ་བརྒྱད, Wylie: rgyud sde chen po bco brgyad) were expounded by Vimalamitra to Ma Rinchen Chok and together they translated them.

Rinchen Chok and Vimalamitra together translated the Guhyagarbha Tantra. Rinchen Chok also translated Vimalamitra's own commentary of the Guhyagarbha. Rinchen Chook translated the Cittabindu Upadesha, a text by the three great siddhas Lilavajra, Buddhaguhya and Vimalamitra.
