= Namkhai Nyingpo =

Tibetan Buddhist practitioner

Nub་Ben Namkhai Nyingpo (gNubs ban Nam mkha’i snying po, Tibetan: གནུབས་བན་ནམ་མཁའི་སྙིང་པོ།, 8th/9th century) is counted amongst the principal "twenty-five disciples" (Wylie: rje 'bang nyer lnga) of Padmasambhava. Nub Ben Namkha'i Nyingpo was a realized practitioner of Śāntarakṣita’s tradition of Sutrayana "gradualist" Mahayana Buddhism as well as simultaneously being one of the most accomplished Tibetan practitioners of the East Mountain Teaching of Chan Buddhism, which transmits the "subitist" tradition of Mahayana Buddhism.

In addition, Nub Ben Namkhai Nyingpo was also a realized master of Dzogchen as well as a Master of the Tantric path (Tantrayana), specifically, the three Outer Tantra yana and the Inner Tantra yana according to the Nyingma school of Tibetan Buddhism.

== Nomenclature, orthography and etymology ==
Namkhai Nyingpo's name may be rendered in English from the Tibetan as "essence of space", "matrix of the sky", "womb of space" and its Sanskrit form is Ākāśagarbha.

== Biography ==
Nub Ben Namkhai Nyingpo was born in Lower Nyal. He was one of the first indigenous Tibetans to take tantric buddhist ordination which empowerment took place at Samye conducted by Khenchen Zhiwa Tsho aka Śāntarakṣita. Namkhai Nyingpo was one of the selected five that Trisong Detsen commissioned to undergo pilgrimage to India with the charge of securing sacred texts, principally tantras, at the behest of Padmasambhava. Namkhai Nyingpo was faithful to his quest and fulfilled his charge and faced his fear. The other four were: Drugu Epaksha, Lang Pelgyi Senge, Singharaja and Dre Gyelwai Lodro, all of whom failed to honour their duty, sacred charge or dharma out of fear. Namkhai Nyingpo was an accomplished siddha who wielded the phurba, an esoteric ritual and magical tool for working with energy and principally the manifestation or activity of energy.

The present Namkhai Nyingpo is the seventh reincarnation in line residing at his main seat in Lhodrak Kharchu, Bumthang, Bhutan. He was born on March 10, 1966, in Tongzhang, Tashi Yangtse in eastern Bhutan. Rinpoche was recognized by the sixteenth Karmapa and was handed over to Dilgo Khyentse Rinpoche to take care of him. Though many reincarnations were born, they came and left unrecognized since they hid themselves as hidden yogis. The fifth Dalai Lama was the one who recognized the first Namkhai Nyingpo reincarnation and from then on, the reincarnation line continues to take rebirth for the benefit of sentient beings.

Dargyay (1977, 1998: p. 33) discusses the particular generation stage cycle of the 'Eight Pronouncements' (Wylie: bka'-brgyad) that Namkhai Nyingpo was 'empowered' (Wylie: dbangs-bskur) to practice by Padmasambhava, and through the 'sadhana' (Wylie: sgrub-sde) of which he realised siddhi:

Nam-mkha'-snying-po practised the cycle Yang-dag-thugs-kyi-snying-thig, and as a sign of successful meditation he rode on a beam of the sun.

== Works ==
- bka' thang sde lnga, an important terma discovered by Orgyen Lingpa that discusses early Tibet and Buddhism in the Tibetan Empire, including Chan Buddhism
- Biography of Yeshe Tsogyal: Namkhai Nyingpo wrote an important biography of Yeshe Tsogyal that has been rendered from the Tibetan into English by Tarthang Tulku.

== See also ==
- Nubchen Sangye Yeshe
