= Practice (Dzogchen) =

Type of Tibetan Buddhist practice

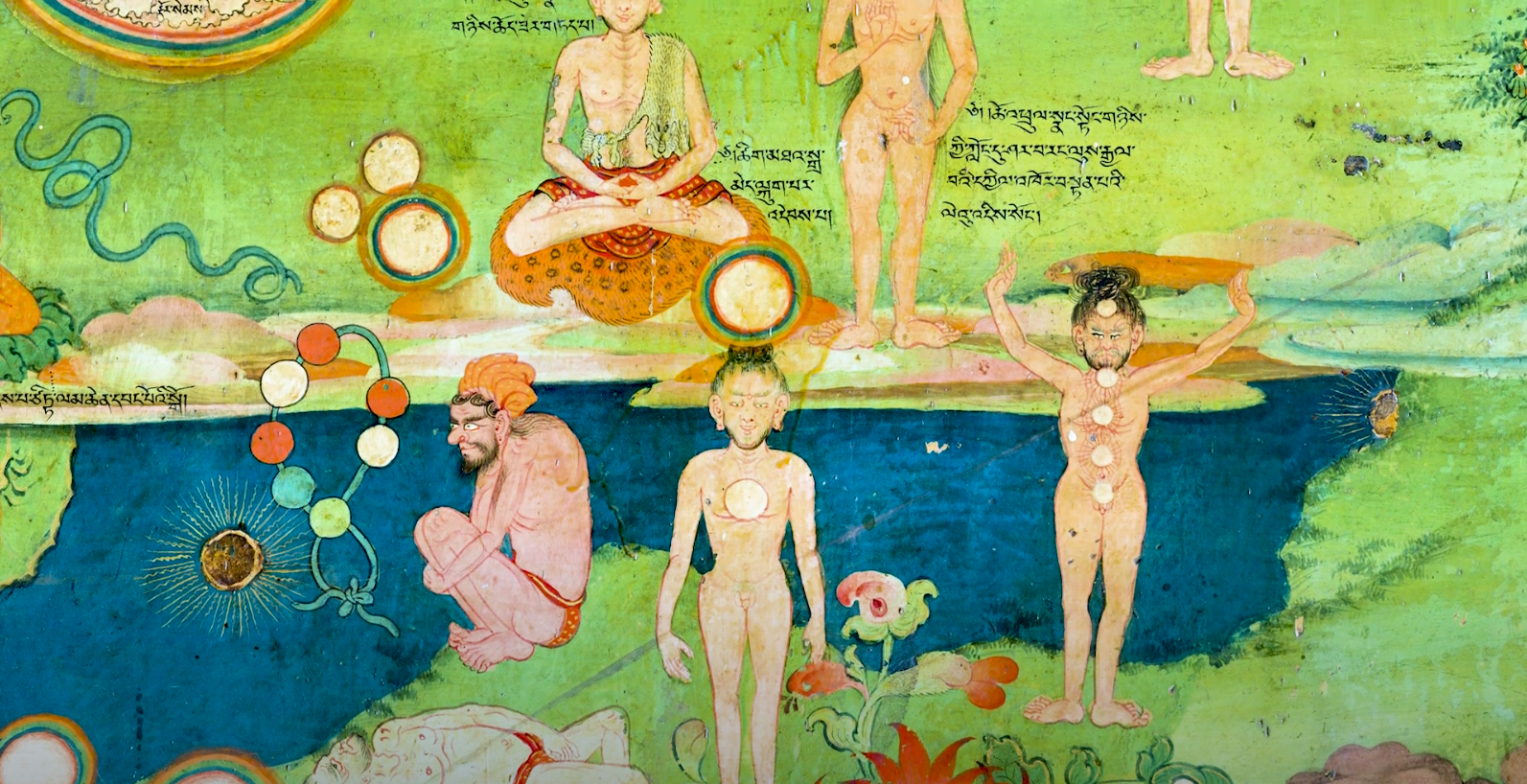
Lukhang Temple mural depicting various Dzogchen practices

Dzogchen practice refers to the various contemplative practices which are part of the Tibetan Buddhist traditions of Dzogchen ("Great Perfection"). Dzogchen contemplation or meditation (Tibetan: gompa) relies on having the proper Dzogchen view, which, according to Tibetan Dzogchen teacher Namkhai Norbu, is not an intellectual view, but a "direct, non-dual, non-conceptual knowledge" of fundamentally pure absolute nature which has become veiled by dualistic conditioning. In Dzogchen, one achieves this view through one's relationship with a guru or lama who introduces one to our own primordial state and provides instruction on how to practice. This "direct introduction" and transmission from a Dzogchen master is considered absolutely essential.

Dzogchen teachings emphasize naturalness, spontaneity and simplicity. Although Dzogchen is often portrayed as being distinct from or beyond tantra, Dzogchen traditions have incorporated many tantric concepts and practices. Dzogchen lineages embrace a varied array of traditions, that range from a systematic rejection of Buddhist tantra, to a full incorporation of tantric practices. The "main practices" (which consist of trekcho and thogal) are often considered advanced and thus preliminary practices and ritual initiation are generally seen as requirements.

== Overview ==
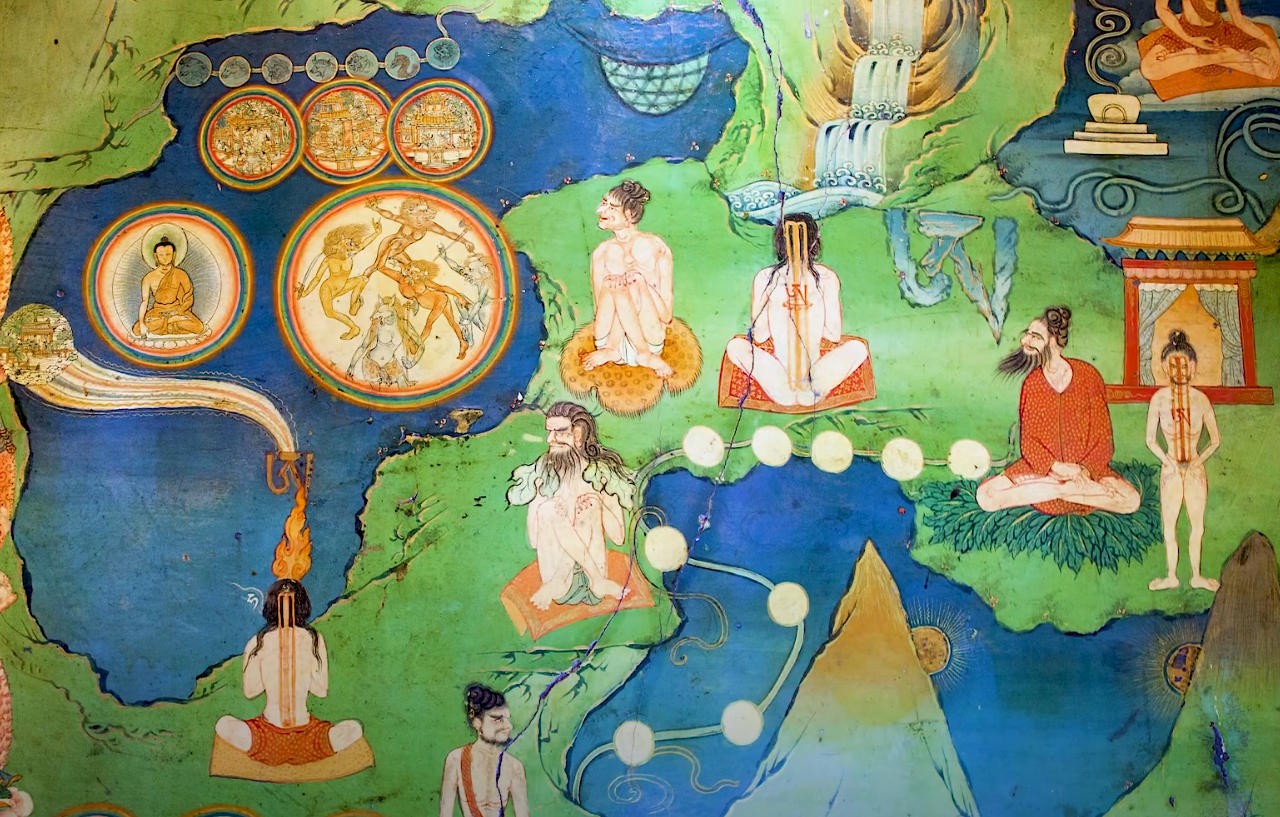
Lukhang Temple mural depicting Dzogchen anuyoga practices such as tummo which work with the subtle body channels

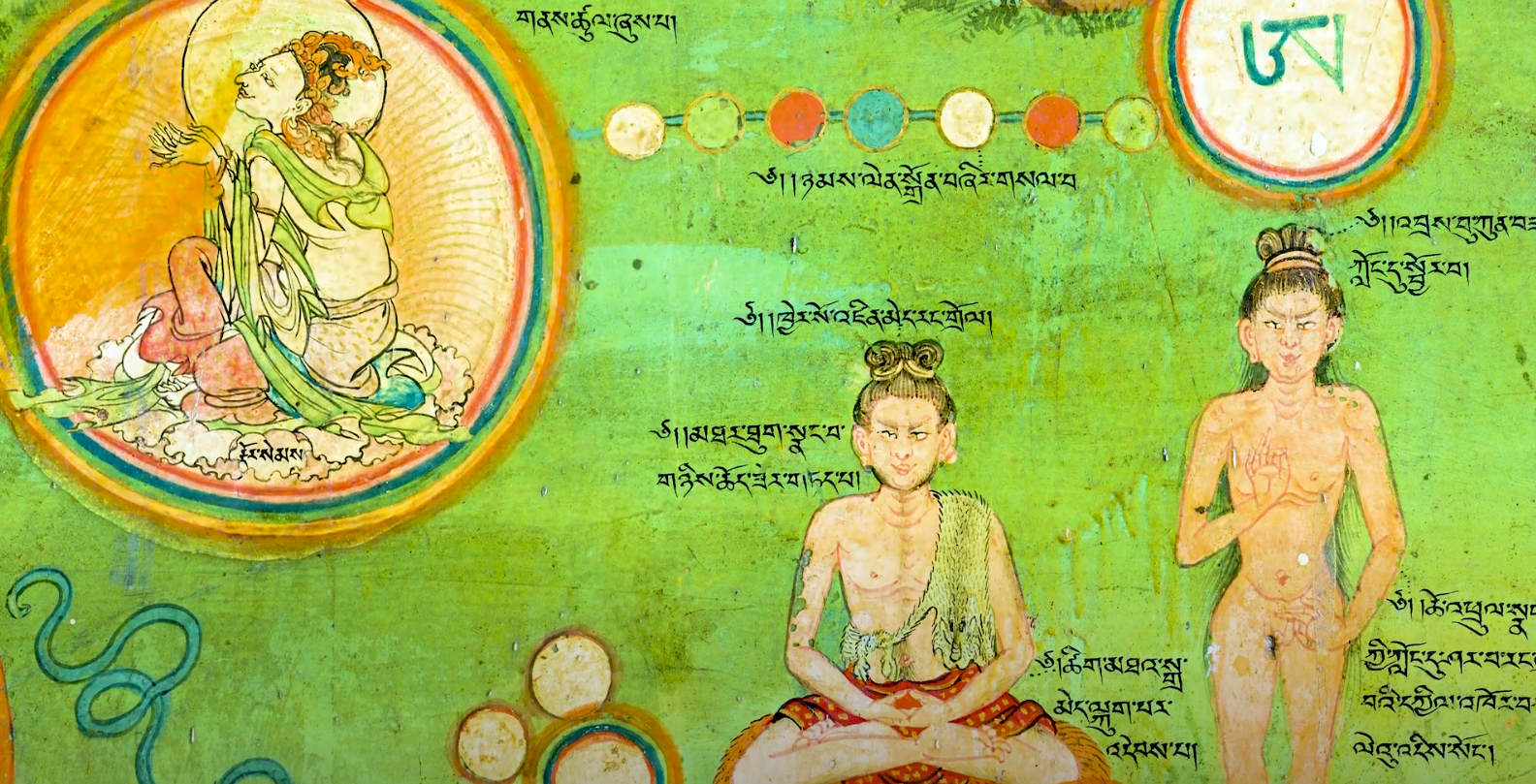
Lukhang mural

The Dzogchen tradition contain vast anthologies and systems of practices, including Buddhist meditation, tantric yogas and unique Dzogchen methods. The earliest form of Dzogchen practice (the Semde, "Mind" series) generally emphasized non-symbolic "formless" practices (as opposed to tantric deity yoga). With the influence of Sarma tantra, the rise of the Longchen Nyingtik tradition, and the systematisations of Longchenpa, the main Dzogchen practices came to be preceded by preliminary practices and infused with tantric practices.

Namkhai Norbu makes a distinction between Dzogchen "contemplation" proper (trekchö) and "meditation". According to Norbu, contemplation is "abiding in the non-dual state [i.e. rigpa] which, of its own nature, uninterruptedly self-liberates" while meditation is any practice "working with the dualistic, relative mind, in order to enable one to enter the state of contemplation." Norbu adds that all the various meditative practices found in Dzogchen teachings (such as the "six yogas") are simply means to help practitioners access rigpa and are thus "secondary."

Similarly, Achard notes that the core Dzogchen practice is the state of contemplation (dgongs pa) that refers to abiding in one's primordially pure state. This "could actually be described as an actual absence of particular practice" which is "devoid of action, effort and exertion" (such as tantric generation or completion practice). Furthermore, Achard notes that "for strict rDzogs chen practitioners, guru yoga and sky gazing are the main means enabling the access to the state of Contemplation in a totally unaltered mode."

=== Preliminary practices ===
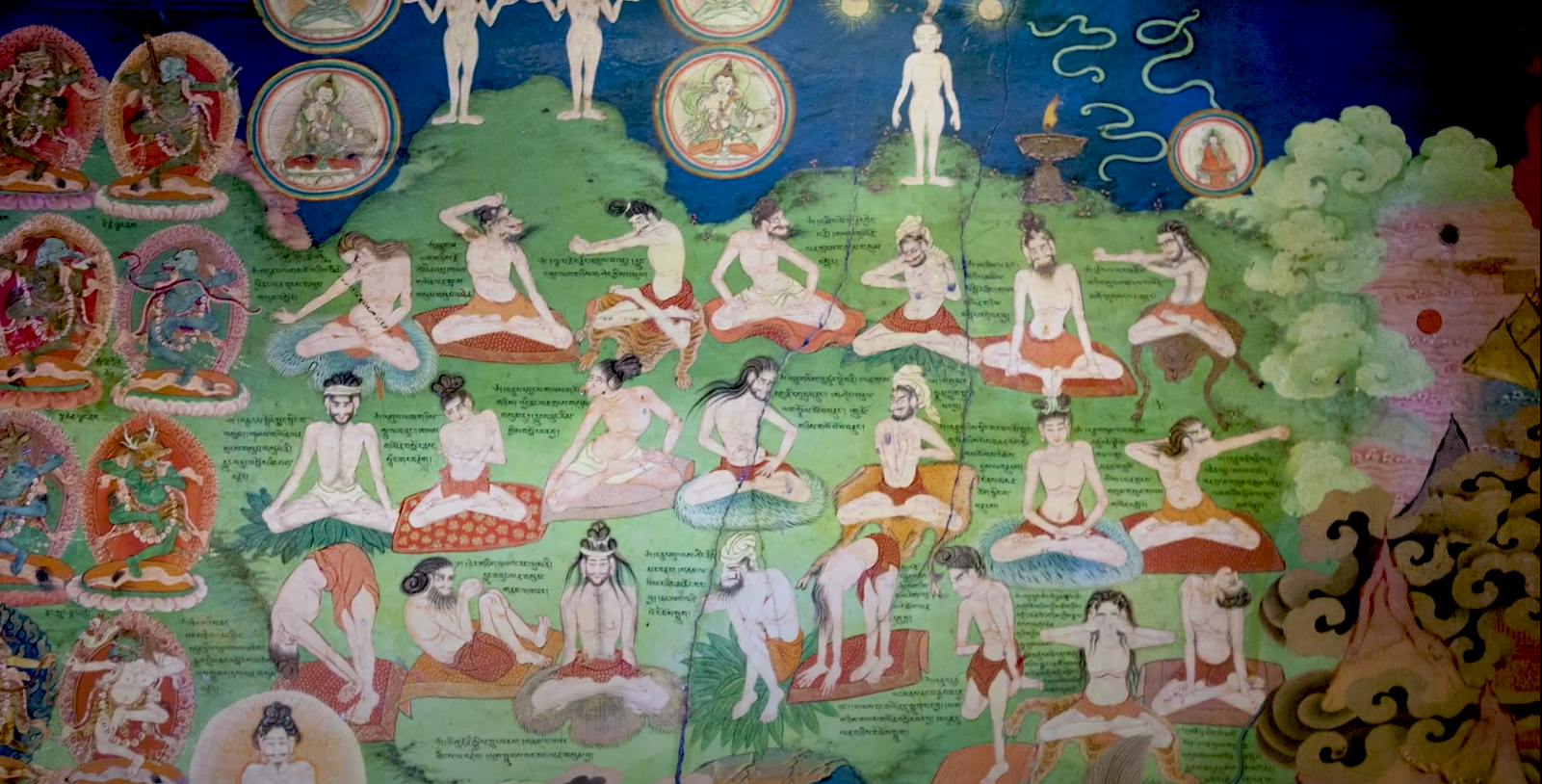
Lukhang Temple mural depicting physical yogas known as trulkhor

In Finding Ease in Meditation (bsam gtan ngal gso), Longchenpa outlines three main categories of preliminary practices. He stresses that these are necessary to the practice of Dzogchen and criticizes those who attempt to skip them.

The Longchen Nyingthig system divides preliminaries into ordinary and extraordinary types. The ordinary preliminaries are a series of contemplations of which there are two main instructional texts. One is based on Atisha's Seven Point Mind Training (Lojong) and is called the Tarpai Temke. The second is the Laglenla Deblug.

The extraordinary preliminaries are discussed in the Drenpa Nyerzhag.

According to Jigme Lingpa, the preliminary practices are the basis of the main practices, and thus, they are not to be abandoned at a later point. Norbu writes that the preliminaries are not compulsory in Dzogchen practice (only direct introduction is essential), instead, the preliminaries are only relatively useful depending on the capacity of individuals and how many obstacles they have in their practice of contemplation.

Another important requirement for practicing Dzogchen according to Jigme Lingpa is ritual initiation or empowerment (dbang) by an awakened lama. According to Tsoknyi Rinpoche, empowerment is necessary, as it plants the "seeds of realization" within the present body, speech and mind. Empowerment "invests us with the ability to be liberated into the already present ground." The practices bring the seeds to maturation, resulting in the qualities of enlightened body, speech and mind.

Following tantric initiation, one also engages in the tantric practices of the generation and completion stages of mahayoga and anuyoga. Jigme Lingpa sees all of these tantric practices as gradual steps to be cultivated which lead one to Great Perfection practice. Jigme Lingpa states:

What is the main point of the excellent path of greatness? It is no more than wiping clean intellectual limitations. Therefore the three vows, six paramitas, development and completion and so on are all steps on the ladder to the Great Perfection.

==== Rushen and sbyong ba ====
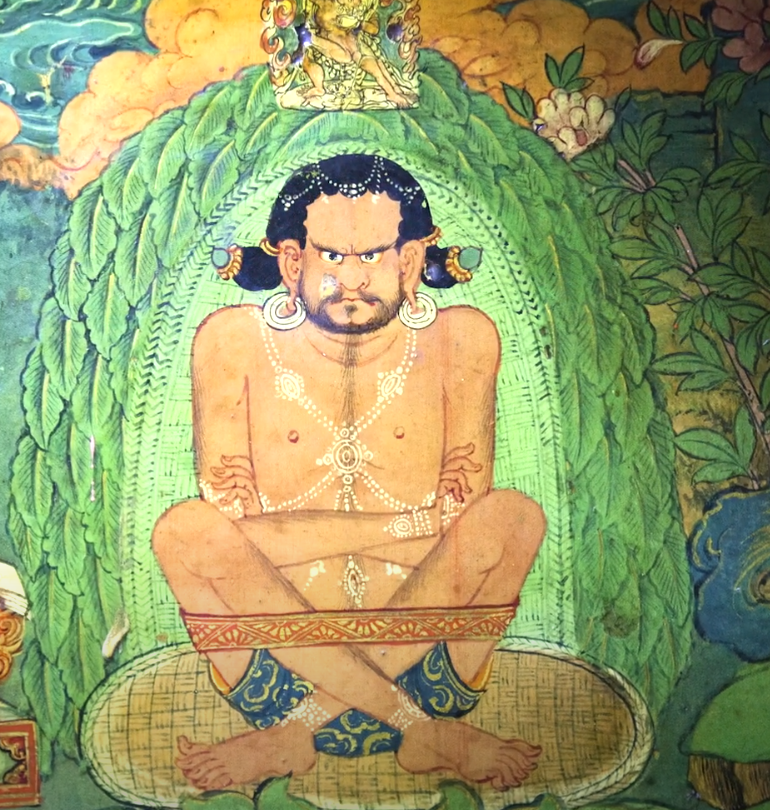
A yogi depicted using a meditation belt (gomthag) in the Lukhang Temple mural

Jigme Lingpa mentions two kinds of Dzogchen meditations (which can be used as preliminaries to trekchö) korde rushen, (Note: 'khor 'das ru shan dbye ba: Tibetan: འཁོར་འདས་རུ་ཤན, Wylie: 'khor 'das ru shan) "making a gap between samsara and nirvana," and sbyong ba ("training").

Rushen are a series of visualisation and recitation exercises. The name reflects the dualism of the distinctions between mind and insight, ālaya and dharmakāya. Longchenpa places this practice in the "enhancement" (bogs dbyung) section of his concluding phase. It describes a practice "involving going to a solitary spot and acting out whatever comes to your mind." (Note: John Pettit, in Tricycle Magazine, winter 1997: "David Germano [...] describes unusual practices of the Great Perfection [...] Germano introduces the "differentiation of Samsara and Nirvana," a form of meditative warm-up exercise that has not, to my knowledge, ever been discussed so explicitly. This practice is unusual by any standard, Tibetan or Western, except perhaps for those who have experimented with Stanislav Grof's Holotropic Breathwork or Primal Scream Therapy. (See also Ego death). In the exercise, a practitioner jumps, prowls, and howls like a wolf and imitates its thought patterns, or pretends to be a mass murderer and then suddenly switches to the outlook of a self-sacrificing saint. "In short," Germano writes, "one lets oneself go crazy physically, verbally and mentally in a flood of diverse activity, so that by this total surrender to the play of images and desire across the mirroring surface of one's being, one gradually comes to understand the very nature of the mirror itself.")

Sbyong ba are a variety of teachings for training the body, speech and mind. The training of the body entails instructions for physical posture. The training of speech mainly entails recitation, especially of the syllable hūm. The training of the mind is a Madhyamaka-like analysis of the concept of the mind, to make clear that mind cannot arise from anywhere, reside anywhere, or go anywhere. They are in effect an establishment of emptiness by means of the intellect. According to Jigme Lingpa, these practices serve to purify the mind and pacify the hindrances.

=== Main practices ===
The actual Dzogchen meditation methods, which are unique to the tradition, appear in Longchen Nyingtik texts such as Jigme Lingpa's Yeshe Lama and Longchenpa's Tsigdön Dzö and Tegchö Dzö. The presentation of Dzogchen meditation methods in the Yeshe Lama is divided into three parts:

- Instructions for those of sharp faculties, which is where the actual Dzogchen meditation methods are found, such as trekchö and tögal.
- Instructions for those of middling faculties, which discusses the bardo (intermediate state) of death and how to practice during this phase
- Instructions for those of lesser faculties, which discusses the transference of consciousness (phowa) at death to a pure land.

==== Contemplation ====
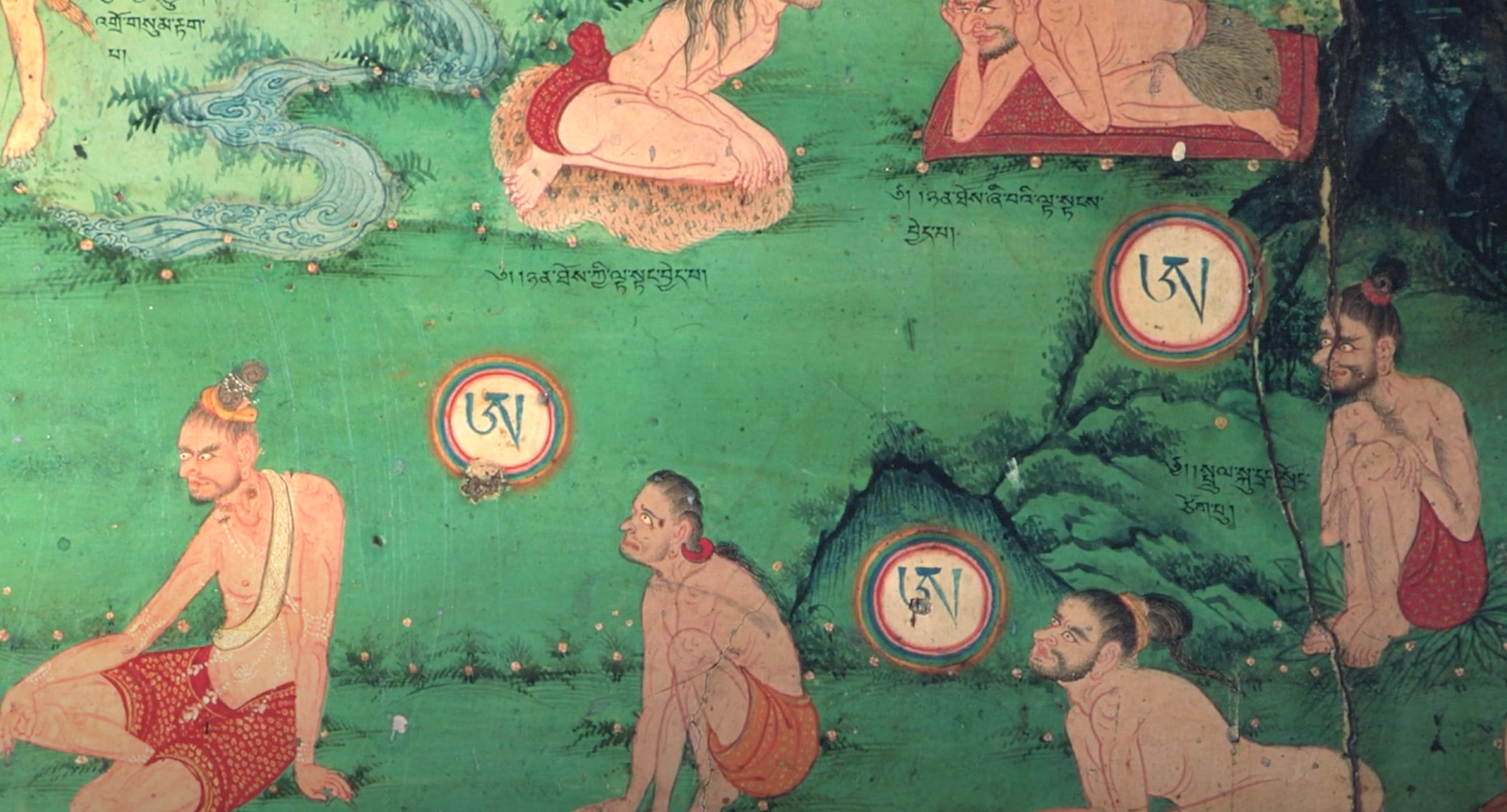
Yogis meditating on the letter A inside a thigle, Lukhang Temple

The Dzogchen meditation practices include a series of exercises known as semdzin (sems 'dzin), which literally means "to hold the mind" or "to fix mind." They include a whole range of methods, including fixation, breathing, and different body postures, all aiming to calm the mind and bring one into the state of contemplation. (Note: Longchenpa divides them into three categories of seven exercises. Exercises in the first category include [F]ixating on a white Tibetan letter A on the tip of one's nose. Linking the letter with one's breathing, it goes out into space with each exhalation and returns to the tip of the nose with each inhalation. This fixation inhibits the arising of extraneous thoughts [...] however, the second exercise in the same category involves the sounding of the syllable PHAT! which instantly shatters one's thoughts and attachments. Symbolically, the two parts of the syllable indicate the two aspects of enlightenment, that is, PHA signifies Means (thabs) and TA signifies Wisdom (shes rab). According to Reynolds, it is this specific Semdzin practice which was used by Patrul Rinpoche to provide a direct introduction to the knowledge of rigpa. It temporarily blocks the flow of thought, and brings us temporarily in a state of emptiness and clarity.) There are also methods of vipasyana (lhagthong) which works with the arising of thoughts. These practices can be found in all three Dzogchen series: Semde, Longdé and Mennagde. Norbu considers these methods of samatha (shine) and vipasyana (lhagthong) to be "principal practices", even though they work with the mind and are not non-dual contemplation itself.

According to Namkhai Norbu, through these various methods one may arrive at "the state of non-dual contemplation" which is without doubts. At this stage, one must continue to remain in this state, which includes the practices of trekchö and tögal.

==== Trekchö ====
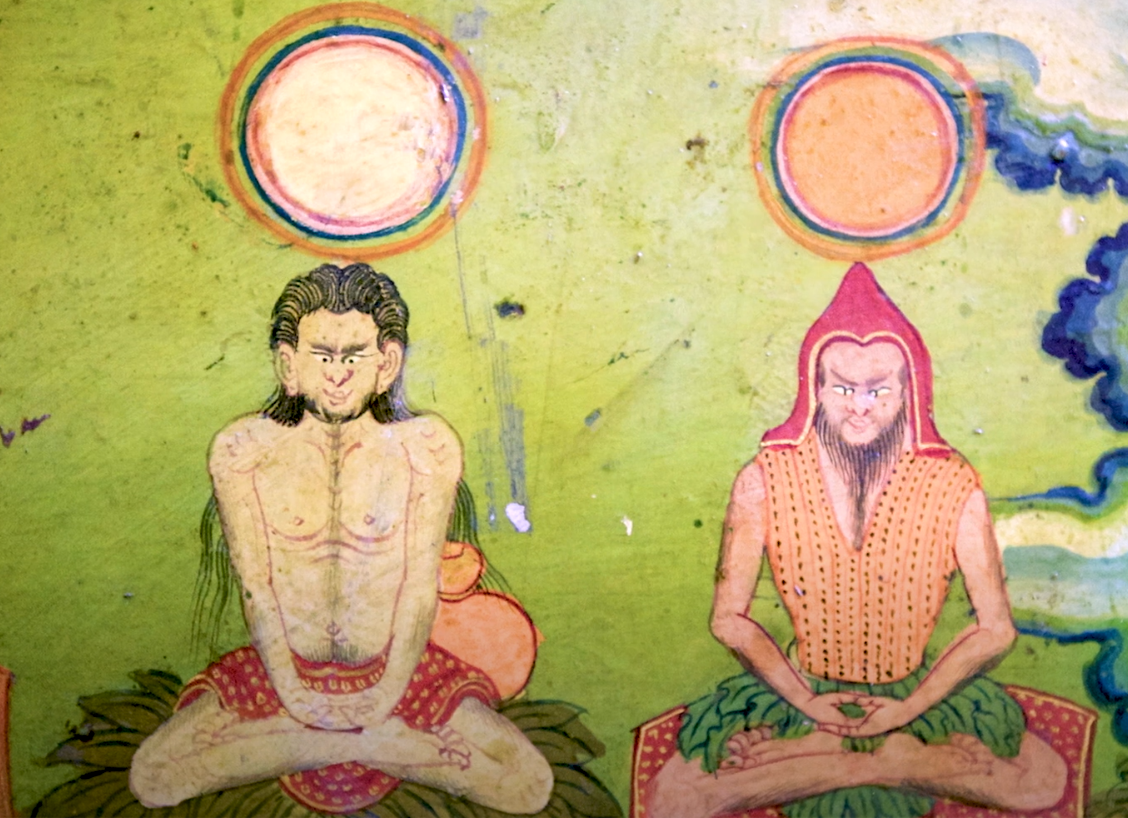
Yogis practicing Dzogchen, Lukhang Temple mural

Trekchö (khregs chod) means "(spontaneous) cutting of tension" or "cutting through solidity". The practice of trekchö reflects the earliest developments of Dzogchen, with its admonition against practice. (Note: Compare Karma Chagme, who associates Trekchö with Semde. He further equates Trekchö with Mahāmudrā,) In this practice one first identifies, and then sustains recognition of, one's own innately pure, empty awareness. The main trekchö instructions in the Lamrim Yeshe Nyingpo state "This instant freshness, unspoiled by the thoughts of the three times; You directly see in actuality by letting be in naturalness."

==== Tögal ====
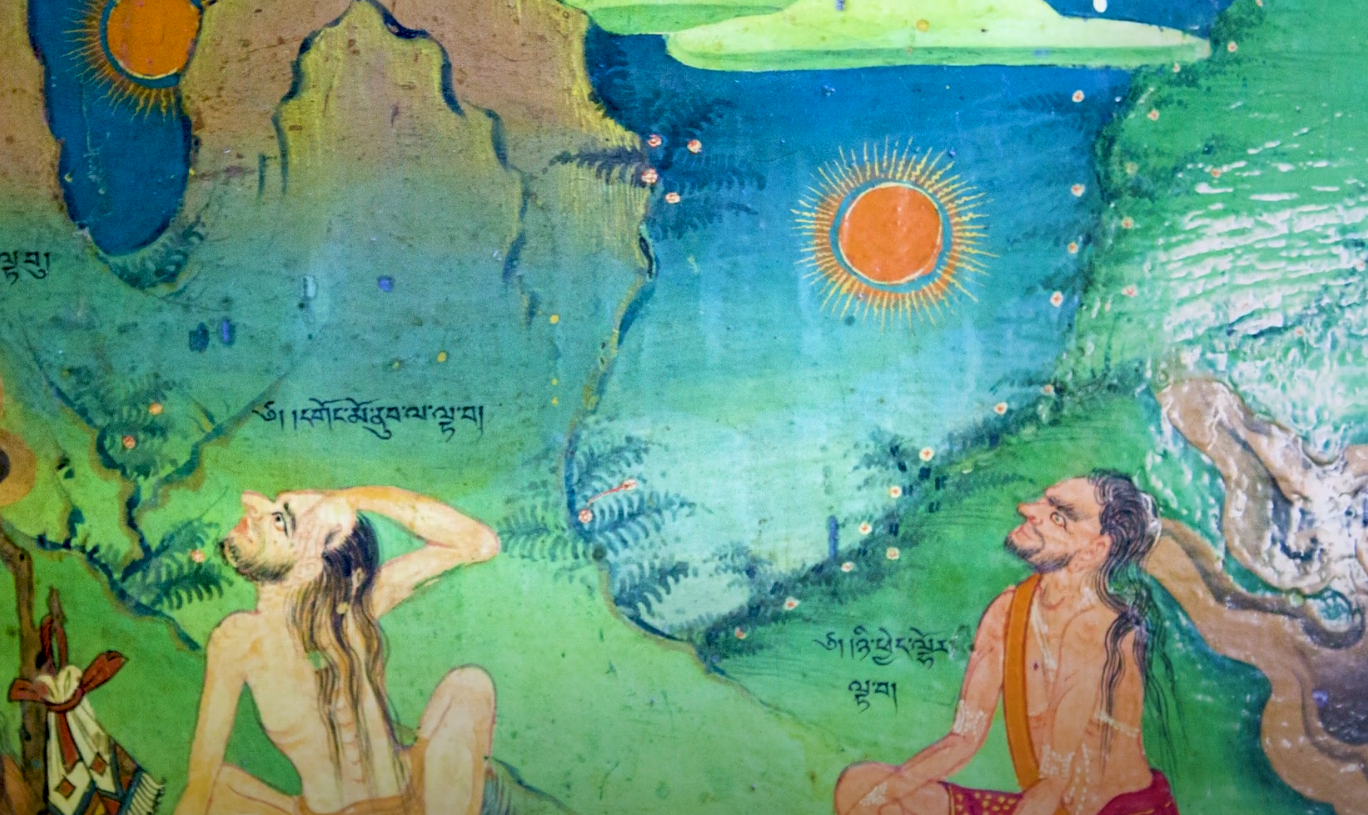
Lukhang Temple mural depicting sky gazing visionary practice

Tögal (thod rgal) literally means "crossing the peak." It is sometimes translated as "leapover", "direct crossing", or "direct transcendence". Tögal is also called "the practice of vision", or "the practice of the Clear Light (od-gsal)". Jigme Lingpa follows Longchenpa in seeing the visionary practice of tögal as the highest level of meditation practice.

==== Phowa (transference of consciousness) ====
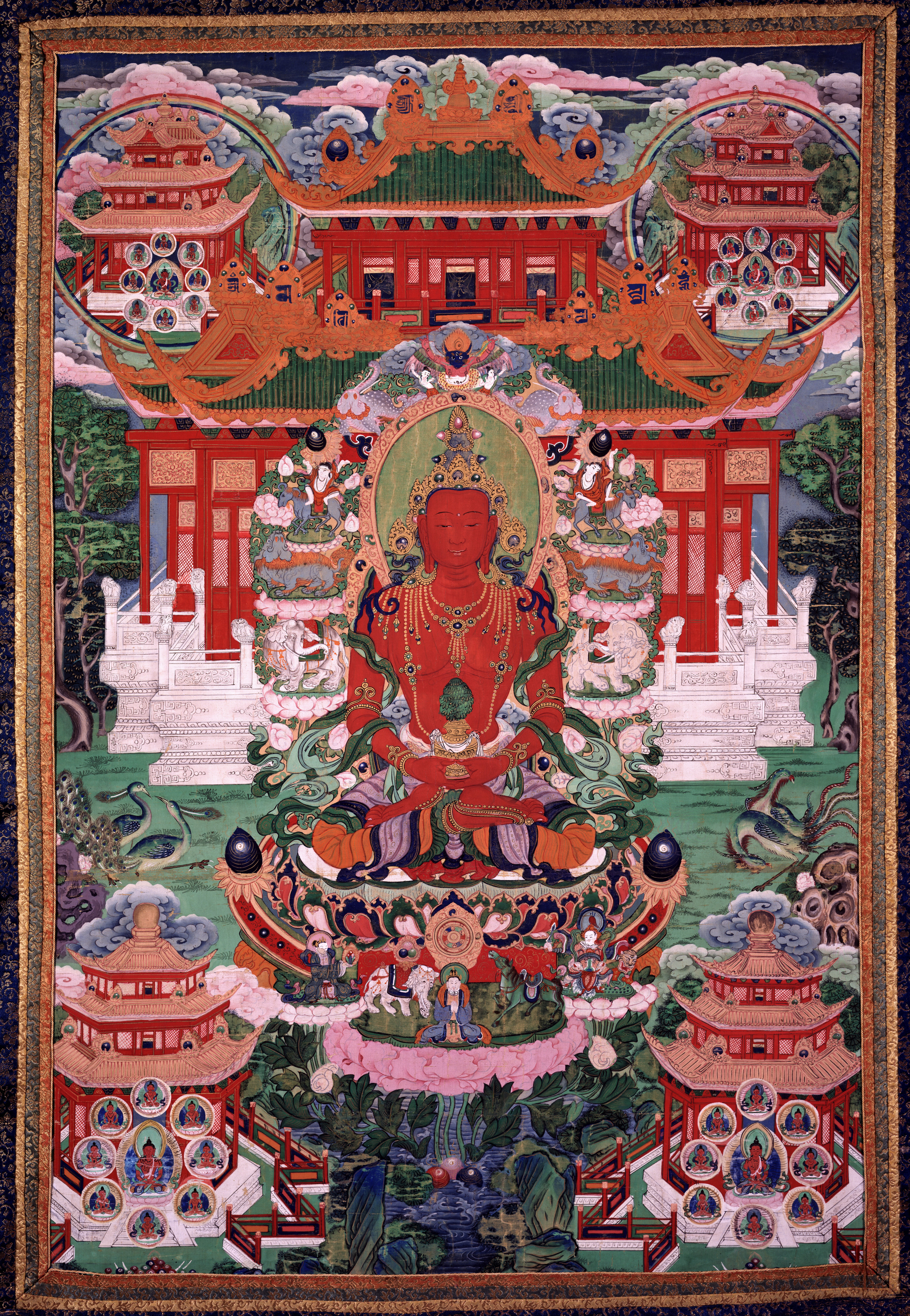
Buddha Amitayus in his Pure Land Sukhavati.

Those beings of lesser faculties and limited potential will not attain awakening during the bardo but may transfer their consciousness (a practice called phowa) to a pure land once they have arrived at the "bardo of existence". Once they reach this bardo, they will recognize they have died and then they will recall the guru with faith and remember the instructions. Then they will think of the pure land and its qualities and they will be reborn there. In a pure land, beings can listen to the Dharma taught directly by Vajrasattva or some other Buddha. Jigme Lingpa recommends that one practice this in daily life as well.

==== Bardo yoga ====
For those of middle level capacities, Jigme Lingpa holds that they will attain awakening during the bardo or intermediate state during death, by following certain instructions on how to recognize the signs of death and how to practice during the death process. Jigme Lingpa describes the process as follows:

Thus, assuming [one of] the three postures or remaining in the sleeping-lion posture, focus awareness on the eyes. With eyes directed to the space of awareness, relinquish the present life and relax uncontrived within original purity. In an instant liberation will occur.

Jigme Lingpa also states one should practice this meditation while one is alive, to prepare for the death process meditation: "even while one is alive, when the sky is pristine, direct awareness into space and think, 'The moment of death has arrived. Now I must pass into the peaceful unelaborate expanse.' Exhale the breath and follow that by allowing the mind to remain without focus." Other meditations and techniques are taught as well, which should be practiced while one is alive.

Jigme Lingpa gives the following instructions, meant to be recited by a lama or fellow practitioner at the time of death. Various practices are also taught for those who are present when someone else is dying, such as the "three precious upadeshas of the great, profound tantra Conjunction of the Sun and Moon". These practices are meant to help the dying through the process and lead them to awakening or a higher rebirth.

Further practices related to the "bardo of the nature of phenomena" are also taught. At this point, one should practice trekchö and tögal. There are also specific instructions for this phase of death, which occurs when "the connection between body and mind has ended." According to Jigme Lingpa, at this stage, the consciousness of the basis of all dissolves into the basic space of phenomena and "in that instant, the natural clear light dawns like a cloudless autumn sky."

If one does not attain awakening, there will be a series of appearances which will be "extremely bright and colorful, devoid of distinctions such as outer, inner, wide, or narrow." There will also be appearances of the mandalas of peaceful and fierce deities. One is supposed to recognize all these appearances as being one's own mind and as lacking true existence.

Jigme Lingpa outlines the key point in bardo practice as follows:

The key point for achieving liberation in this way is to abide in unimpeded empty awareness, as the nature of original purity, beyond thought and expression. Having actually realized the ultimate ground of liberation, it is then necessary to encounter that which already is, decide upon that alone, and have confidence within liberation. Appearances by nature, when observed objectively, seem to be limitless; but, when observed subjectively, nothing whatsoever exists. However, even fixation upon the thought of nonexistence is naturally liberated in the first instant that one's own nature is nakedly revealed without mental analysis. This is the key point clearly defining the original ground of liberation. In whatever way compassion engages with objects, do not try to stop this pursuit or hold this within. With awareness placed precisely upon its own source, unimpeded cognition is without the distinctions of outer, inner, and between. In this way, the bardo appearances will be naturally pure in the radiance of awareness. This is a key point of the quintessential heart essence for recognizing the state of liberation with precise awareness.

== Practice systems ==
=== Longchenpa's Natural Ease system ===
Longchenpa's Trilogy of Natural Ease (ngal gso skor gsum), is mainly a Semde (Mind Series) focused system, though it includes numerous elements from later more tantric systems. In the first volume of this trilogy, Finding Ease in the Nature of Mind (sems nyid ngal gso), Longchenpa outlines 141 contemplative practices, split into three sections: exoteric Buddhism (92), tantra (22), and the Great Perfection (27). This system remained influential in Tibet and was the main system taught by Patrul Rinpoche (1808-1887).

This system includes numerous contemplative practices including analytical contemplations into emptiness, calming (zhi gnas) practices (such as visualizing the channels, a deity or the breath), insight (lhag mthong) practices as well the integration (zung 'jug) of calming and insight (such as the practice of sky gazing or contemplating the mind). It also includes numerous contemplations which are formless and "technique free" and thus do not make sure of an object of focus (such as a tantric deity) and instead focus on intangible themes such as emptiness, the spaciousness of the mind and the illusory quality of appearances.

In the second book of the Trilogy of Natural Ease, Finding Ease in Meditation (bsam gtan ngal gso), Longchenpa uses the standard triad of meditative experiences (nyams) to present various practices: bliss (bde ba), radiance/clarity (gsal ba), and non-conceptuality (mi rtog pa), which is presented as corresponding to preliminaries, main practice, and concluding phase. The bliss practices are focused on tummo, "radiance" practices use the bodily winds/breath and visualization of light, and the practices dealing with non-conceptuality are based on contemplating the vastness of the sky.

The more conceptual meditations are relegated to the preliminary phase, while the main practices are formless and "direct" approaches supplemented by perfection stage techniques (i.e. anuyoga). Longchenpa includes the perfection phase techniques of channels, winds and nuclei into the main and concluding phases which also include new supporting contemplative techniques. However, unlike in other perfection stage practice systems, Longchenpa's perfection practices are extremely simple (spros med), and stress effortlessness and balance instead of complexity (spros bcas).

=== Jigme Linpa's Longchen Nyingthig system ===
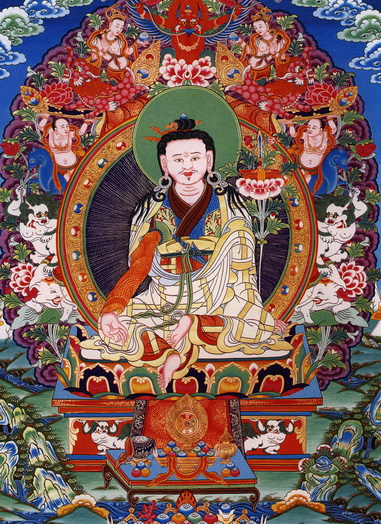
Jigme Lingpa's systematization of the Longchen Nyingtik tradition is one of the most influential systems of Dzogchen practice.

The teachings based on Jigme Lingpa's 18th century Longchen Nyingthig system are also divided into preliminary practices (ngondro, subdivided into various classes) and main practices (which are trekchö and tögal). In The White Lotus (rGyab brten padma dkar po), Jigme Lingpa outlines the path of Nyingthig Dzogchen practice as follows:

Your mindstream is purified by the profound initiation, which is the cause of ripening, and then you begin with the outer, inner and secret preliminaries, which can be equated with the path of accumulation in the Paramitayana. For beginners, the way of practicing is explained by the practice instructions and the lama's instructions.

According to Sam van Schaik, Jigme Lingpa's system of practice "represents both a graduated method and a gradual realization" which "stands in stark contrast to the discourse of the Great Perfection treasure texts," which defend a much more simultaneous form of practice.
