= Trekchö =

Dzogchen "cutting through" practice

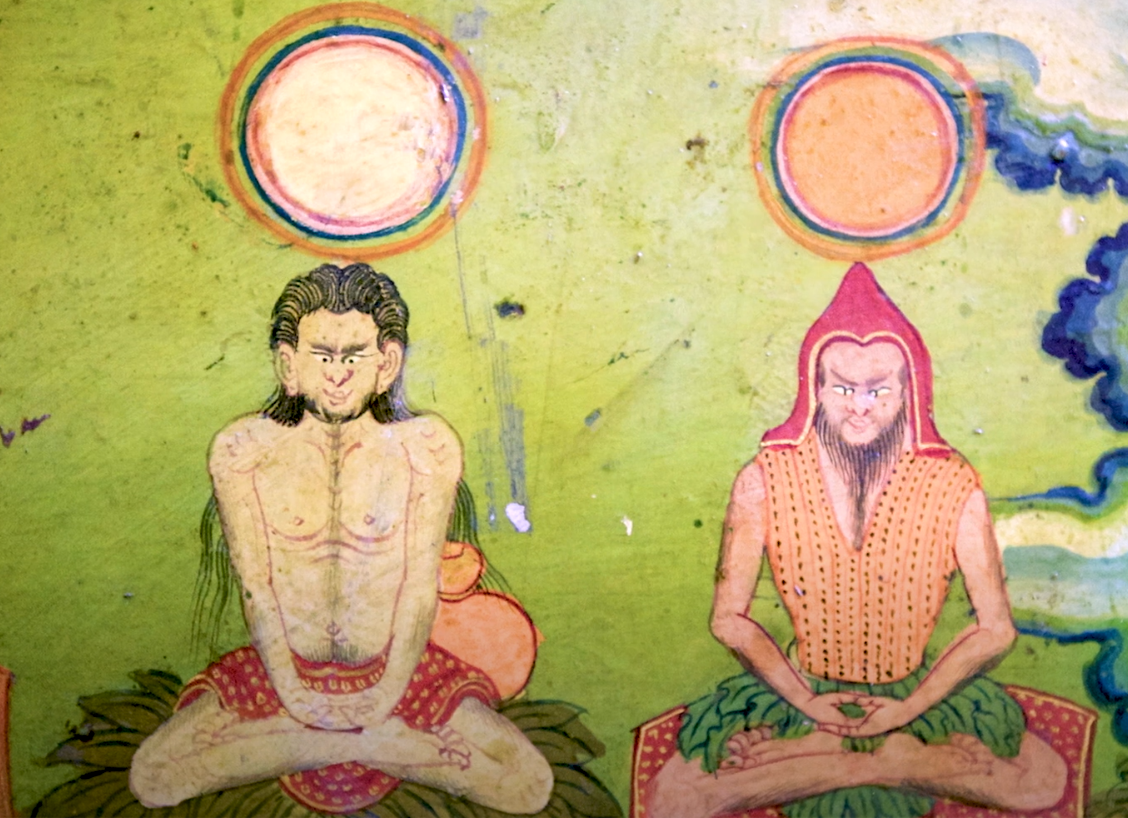
Yogis practicing Dzogchen, Lukhang Temple mural

In Dzogchen, trekchö (khregs chod) means "(spontaneous) cutting of tension" or "cutting through solidity." The practice of trekchö reflects the earliest developments of Dzogchen, with its admonition against practice. (Note: Compare Karma Chagme, who associates trekchö with Semde. He further equates trekchö with Mahāmudrā.) In this practice one first identifies, and then sustains recognition of, one's own innately pure, empty awareness. The main trekchö instructions in the Lamrim Yeshe Nyingpo state "This instant freshness, unspoiled by the thoughts of the three times; You directly see in actuality by letting be in naturalness."

== Definition ==
According to Malcolm Smith, trekchö can also be interpreted as meaning "an undone bundle", "like a hay bale with the twine." In Vimalamitra's Great Commentary, trekchö is defined as "the system of buddhahood through immediate liberation as a directly perceived realization that is not connected to appearances," and states that this is "the superior intimate instruction for the lazy who attain buddhahood instantly without meditation practice."

== Practice ==
Students receive pointing-out instruction (sems khrid, ngos sprod) in which a teacher introduces the student to the nature of his or her mind. According to Tsoknyi Rinpoche, these instructions are received after the preliminary practices, though there's also a tradition to give them before the preliminary practices. Tsoknyi Rinpoche states, "As for my own personal experience, when I underwent the ngöndro training, I had already received some Dzogchen instructions. The awakened state of rigpa had been pointed out, and I had a lukewarm certainty about what it was. But the ngondro helped me progress.

Jigme Lingpa divides the trekchö practice into ordinary and extraordinary instructions. The ordinary section comprises the rejection of the "all is mind – mind is empty" approach, which is a conceptual establishment of emptiness. Jigme Lingpa's extraordinary instructions give the instructions on the breakthrough proper, which consist of the setting out of the view (lta ba), the doubts and errors that may occur in practice, and some general instructions thematized as "the four ways of being at leisure" (cog bzhag), which are "a set of brief instructions on the spheres of view (lta ba), meditation (sgom pa), activity (spyod pa), and result ('bras bu)" according to van Schaik."

The Seminal Heart tradition in general considers that pointing out instructions should be kept secret until the moment the lama reveals it to the student. In the Yeshe Lama, Jigme Lingpa gives the following passage as an introduction to the nature of mind:

Kye! Do not contrive or elaborate the awareness of this very moment. Allow it to be just as it is. This is not established as existing, not existing, or having a direction. It does not discern between emptiness and appearances and does not have the characteristics of nihilism and eternalism. Within this state where nothing exists, it is unnecessary to exert effort through view or meditation. The great primordial liberation is not like being released from bondage. It is natural radiance uncontrived by the intellect, wisdom unsullied by concepts. The nature of phenomena, not tainted by the view and meditation, is evenness without placement and post-evenness without premeditation. It is clarity without characteristics and vastness not lost to uniformity. Although all sentient beings have never been separate from their own indwelling wisdom even for an instant, by failing to recognize this, it becomes like a natural flow of water solidifying into ice. With the inner grasping mind as the root cause and outer objective clinging as the contributing circumstance, beings wander in samsara indefinitely. Now, with the guru's oral instructions, at the moment of encountering awareness-without any mental constructions-rest in the way things truly are, without wavering from or meditating on anything. This fully reveals the core wisdom intent of the primordial Buddha Kuntuzangpo.

Regarding the "four cog bzhags", in the Yeshe Lama, these four ways of "freely resting" or "easily letting be" are described by Jigme Lingpa as follows:

(a) Placement in the mountainlike view: After realizing the true nature-free of thoughts-as it is, remain in the naturally clear, great awareness that is not subject to mental efforts, grasping, or the usage of intentional meditation antidotes [against concepts].

(b) Oceanlike meditation: Sit in the lotus posture. Look at space in a state of openness. Avoid grasping at the perceptions of the six consciousnesses. Clear your cognition like the ocean free of waves.

(c) Skill in activities: Abruptly relax your three doors of body, speech, and mind. Break free of the cocoon of view and meditation. Just maintain your clear, naked wisdom naturally.

(d) Unconditional result: Let the five mental objects remain naturally as they are. Then natural clarity arises vividly within you.

The "setting out of the view" tries to point the reader toward a direct recognition of rigpa, insisting upon the immanence of rigpa, and dismissive of meditation and effort). Insight leads to nyamshag, "being present in the state of clarity and emptiness". To practice trekchö meditation, Jigme Lingpa states one sits cross legged with eyes open.

His instructions on trekchö begin by stating that one must "settle in the present moment of gnosis [rigpa], without spreading out or gathering in." Rigpa is defined as that knowledge where "the extremes of existence and nonexistence are unaccomplished."

== See also ==
- Rigpa
- Sky gazing
- Tögal
- Trul khor
