= Sky gazing (Dzogchen) =

Tibetan Buddhist practice

In Dzogchen, sky gazing (Wylie: nam mkha' ar gtad, THDL: namkha arté) is one of the core practices of trekchö as well as tögal. It is part of the Nyingma school of Tibetan Buddhism and Bon. Detailed instructions on the practice are provided by the Nyingma teacher Tarthang Tulku, among others. The result of the practice is the attainment of rainbow body.

== History of the sky-gazing practice ==
The most comprehensive study of the Sky-gazing meditation known as thod rgal has been written by Flavio A. Geisshuesler. Although the term thod rgal is generally translated as "Direct Transcendence" or "Leap Over," Geisshuesler argues that the expression really means "Skullward Leap" as it consists of the Tibetan words thod ("above," "over," but also "head wrapper," "turban," "skull") and rgal ("to leap over"). In the larger Tibetan cultural area, it is the most elevated part of the human body—the skull or, its extension in the form of a turban-like headdress—that allows the religious practitioner to gain access to the source of vitality located in the heavens. Both the head and the headdress have deep resonances with animals—particularly deer and sheep—which are central for the sky-gazing practice because of their ability to ascend and descend vertically to move in between various realms of existence.

== In trekchö ==
As sky gazing can be practised in different contexts, both trekchö and tögal, it can have multiple purposes. Like many other meditation techniques, one of the more superficial purposes is relaxation. Many people who meditate because of stress-related problems try to get out of their thoughts. Sky gazing meditation follows this intention by moving out of your thoughts, into space and emptiness. This can cause a calming effect because the practitioner learns to let go.

Lama Surya Das describes this in his book Natural Radiance: "Through this practice of natural meditative awareness, our innate wakefulness completely unfurls and reveals itself. We gradually release our small, narrow, egotistical, dualistic minds into the non-dual, sky-like, infinite Buddha mind, while meditating on the expansive, inclusive nature of rigpa: our natural wisdom-mind and innate wakefulness. In this practice, we merge the finite, thinking heart-mind with the absolute, unconditional infinity of essential Buddha-like being."

He elaborates on that by explaining that the sky is perfect for this kind of release because of the spacious character of the sky. While our dualistic minds are concentrated on forms, the sky is an invitation to a state of formlessness. It is also a metaphor for timelessness. While the sky may have a changing content, the sky itself does not change. He also notes the connection with nature we gain from this practice. Not only with the physical nature, but our own true nature as well. This true nature will be observed because we dissolve into the open sky, showing we are one with the 'infinite'.

In The Healing Power of Mind, Tulku Thondup also mentions the power of sky gazing practice to deal with heavy emotions, by allowing them to dissolve in the open sky.

== In tögal ==
The true nature of our mind can also be shown in various luminous and bright-coloured visualisations that are part of the tögal practice. These visions often include Tibetan symbols like deities and mandalas. This way of experiencing visions is very different from other visualisation practices as it is not 'building' a vision of any kind and does not involve instruction. In Dzogchen, the practitioners have instant visions and realisations that are not guided and the goal is to 'do' as little as possible. Dzogchen doctrine believes in natural, self-arising liberation where the meditator is just allowing and recognising the nature of mind.

The practice of sky gazing in this context leads to the four visions. These are, according to The Oxford Handbook of Meditation:

1. Vision of direct perception of reality.
2. Vision of increasing meditative experience.
3. Vision of the cultivation of awareness.
4. Vision of the cessation of clinging to reality.

At the end of the fourth vision, the practitioner will attain the rainbow body. This transition of letting go of the physical body is described as dissolving his materiality into space and light like ice melts into water.

Another teaching in tögal context is called 'the six lamps.' The practitioner realises different levels of light by sky gazing. These levels are described in Tibetan Yogas of Body, Speech, and Mind to be:

1. The vast infinite space that is the base of all.
2. The space within our heart centre.
3. The subtle channels connecting the heart with the eyes.
4. The space in our organs of perception.
5. The space in all external visions.
6. The space in the visions we experience in the bardo.

=== Entoptic effects in the first vision ===
The first things a practitioner will encounter are simple patterns of luminous dots. There are a few scientific reasons why one might start to observe patterns when sky gazing. When someone is looking at a uniform image for a longer time, the brain can start to create visions because of a lack of changing input for the senses. Secondly, these visions can be caused by lights and forms from within the eye, like "darting streaks of light, slowly drifting blobs, and chains of spots that appear to race along winding pathways."

These are called entoptic lights and are divided into 'floaters' and the blue-field entoptic effect, The first one is caused by liquids and substances moving in the vitreous humor of the eye. The second is perceived as changing rapidly and are caused by white blood cells in the capillaries. These are especially visible against a blue background. The practitioner should not make these effects the centre of its attention, but let them be. These entoptic effects are described to be divine forms or introductions to the practice itself. The notion of them being divine seems more a common way to view natural appearances instead of a religious statement. This is not a scientific explanation for the more complex visions that may arise. These entoptic effects are explained to not be distracted by them.

As these effects can be a tool to start your visualisations, practitioners are advised to use the open sky (because of the colour) but any plain background such as a wall or ceiling.

=== The cognitive study of the four visions ===
In his comprehensive introduction to the sky-gazing practice, Flavio A. Geisshuesler dedicates an entire chapter to the cognitive study of the four visions. Drawing on approaches from enactivism and predictive coding, he argues that the visions represent a perfect example for how humans are fundamentally meaning-making creatures. In fact, the meditation on the empty sky or the darkness in dark-retreat practice creates a sort of sensory deprivation that allows the meditating yogis to observe how their minds function on the most fundamental level. Indeed, although the tradition claims that the practice offers a way of seeing reality as it is—a phenomonen described as "naked vision" (cer mthong)—the visions are actually showing that this type of direct experience of reality is not truly possible. As Geisshuesler puts it, "Ultimately, the presumed perceptional nakedness of Skullward Leap is clothed in a series of garments that have been woven from the threads formed during the ancient—largely pre-Buddhist—period of Tibet."
