= Tummo =

Vajrayana meditation practice

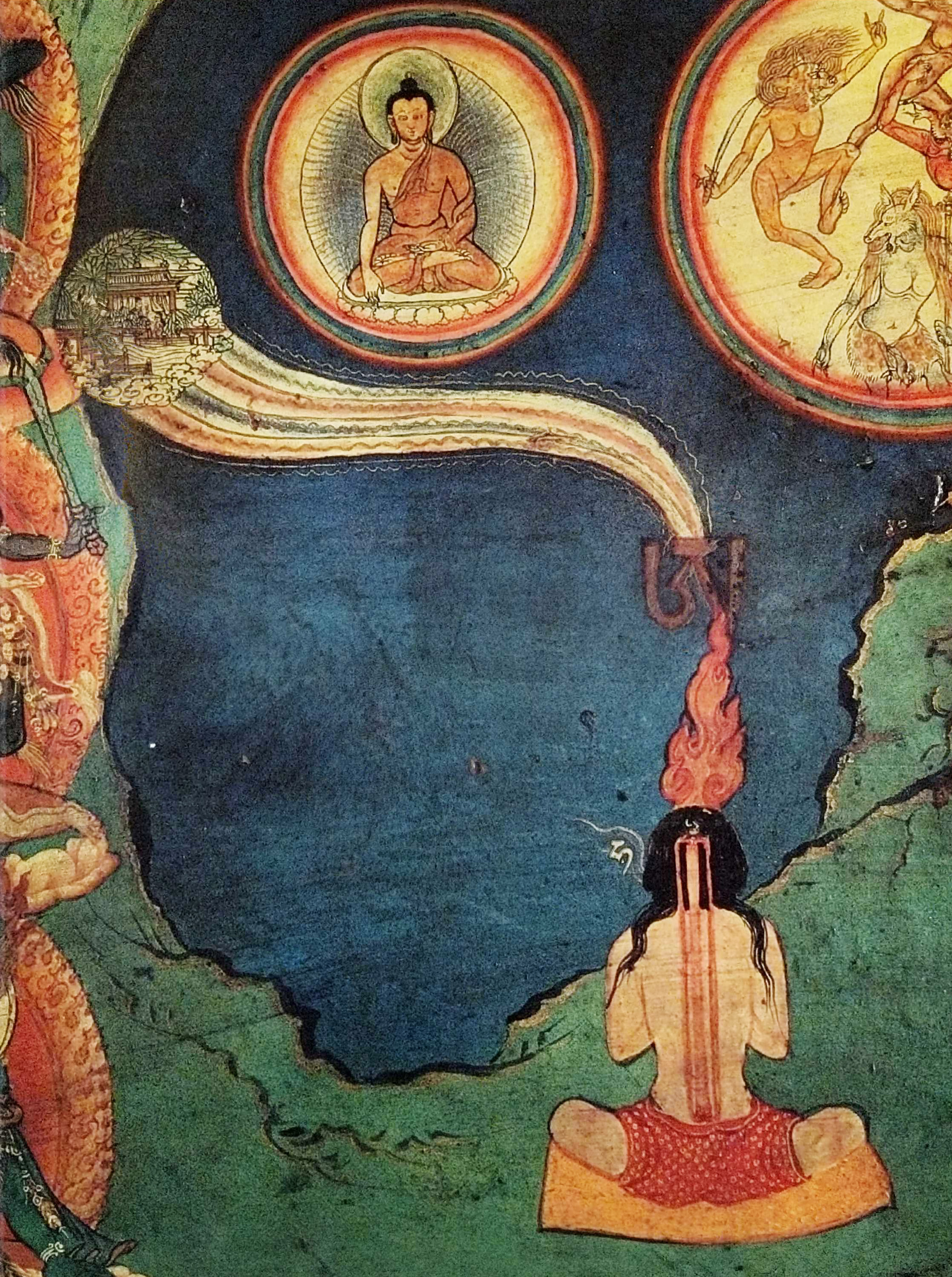
A section of the Northern wall mural at the Lukhang Temple depicting both Tummo (inner fire) and Phowa (transference of consciousness)

In Tibetan Buddhism, tummo (Tibetan: གཏུམ་མོ, Wylie: gtum-mo; Sanskrit: चण्डाली, romanized: caṇḍālī) is the fierce goddess of heat and passion. Tummo is found in the Mahasiddha Krishnacarya and the Hevajra Tantra texts.

Tummo is also a tantric practice for inner heat, developed around the concept of the female deity. It is found in the Six Dharmas of Naropa, Lamdre, Kalachakra, and Anuyoga teachings of Vajrayana. The purpose of tummo is to gain control over body processes during the completion stage of Anuyoga or Anuttarayoga Tantra ('highest yoga tantra').

The practice begins by visualizing the body's energy channels, winds, drops, and chakras. Inner heat, generated through specific breath-holding exercises, helps vital winds enter the central channel, leading to blissful experiences. The practice also involves focusing on seed syllables at the chakras and combining them with meditation on emptiness. Over time, practitioners aim to master this process, achieving heightened states of clarity, inner heat, and bliss.

Scientific studies have explored the effects of tummo, demonstrating body temperatures up to 38.3 °C (100.9 °F) in general and by over 8 °C (14 °F) in body extremities together with increased activation of the default mode network of the brain, metabolism, and thermal power output among expert meditators. While the practice's effects on body temperature have been investigated, its primary purpose within Tibetan Buddhism remains focused on spiritual development, combining visualization, breath, and meditation to harness the inner fire and achieve profound states of enlightenment.

== Etymology ==
Tummo (gTum mo in Wylie transliteration, also spelled tumo, or tum-mo; Sanskrit caṇḍālī or chandali) is a Tibetan word, literally meaning 'fierce [woman]'. Tummo is also the Tibetan word for 'inner fire.' Tummo may also be rendered in English, approximating its phonemic pronunciation as dumo.

== Practice ==
Inner heat (gtum mo, skt. chandali, literally meaning "fierce, hot or savage woman") practice is the foundation for the rest of the six dharmas and is the first of the six dharmas. This practice works with the subtle body (also known as the vajra-body) system of channels (nadis), winds (lung, vayu), drops (bindus) and chakras. Through inner heat, the vital winds are caused to enter into the central channel (avadhuti), causing the four blisses or joys which is then unified with the wisdom that understands emptiness.

This practice is a kind of pranayama, that generally involves sitting with a straight back, visualizing the channels, holding the breath deep in the abdomen for extended periods (called "vase breath", kumbhaka), then applying visualization of a fiery short stroke AH syllable on the navel. This practice leads the vital winds into the central channel, where they are said to melt the drops (bindus, which are tiny spheres of subtle energy) causing great bliss. This powerful bliss experience "is said to constitute a similitude of the actual bliss experienced in spiritual awakening (byang chub, bodhi)."

According to Glenn Mullin, tantric scriptures state that the tantric bliss experienced in this practice is "a hundred times more intense than ordinary sexual orgasm, [and] gives rise to a special state of consciousness." This ecstatic state of mind is then used to contemplate emptiness. This "ecstasy conjoined with (the wisdom of) emptiness" is what is referred to as Mahamudra ('Great Seal').

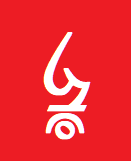
Upside down Tibetan script Haṃ seed syllable

Tilopa's verses of the six dharmas briefly outlines the practice as follows:

The yogic body, a collection of energy channels, coarse and subtle, possessing the energy fields, is to be brought under control. The method begins with the physical exercises. The vital airs [i.e., energies] are drawn in, filled, retained and dissolved. There are the two side channels, the central channel avadhuti, and the four chakras. Flames rise from the chandali fire at the navel. A stream of nectar drips down from the syllable HAM at the crown, invoking the four joys. There are four results, like that similar to the cause, and six exercises that expand them.

=== Kagyu lineage ===
==== Gampopa's presentation ====
Ulrich Timme Kragh outlines the progression of this practice from one of Gampopa's manuals, entitled Closely Stringed Pearls. After describing the visualization of the three channels, the text outlines the four chakras which are to be visualized along the central channel with various spokes radiating out of each chakra like an open umbrella. The four chakras described by Gampopa are:

- At the navel, there is the emanation-cakra with 64 spokes.
- At the heart, there is the Dharmacakra with 8 spokes.
- In the throat, there is the enjoyment-cakra with 16 spokes.
- At the top of the head, there is the great-bliss-cakra with 32 spokes.

Kragh outlines the practice as follows:

it is instructed that the practitioner should hold the breath below the navel to make the A-letter flare up like a flame, the fire reaching so high that the flames strike the letter Ham visualized in the great-bliss-cakra. This causes an energy called bodhicitta (byang sems), which is stored in this cakra, to trickle down through the central channel. As it fills up the different cakras on its way down, it generates different experiences of bliss. After reaching and filling the navel-cakra, the bodhicitta is visualized as flowing back up, while yogi continues to use the gtum mo breathing technique of holding the breath for as long as possible in the abdomen. At the end of the practice, the practitioner stops visualizing (yid la mi byed) the channels, winds, and drops, and instead rests in an uncontrived state of Mahamudra (phyag rgya chen po ma bcos pa'i ngang).

Another meditation manual by Gampopa also mentions a practice that relies on visualizing a drop (thig le, *bindu) between the eyebrows. This bindu descends and ascends through the central channel, spreading a sensation of bliss-emptiness along the way. Regarding post-meditation, the yogi is "instructed to train in experiencing all sensory impressions as blissful and to maintain a constant sense of inner heat and the soothing, cooling bliss of the descending bodhicitta. It is said that the experience of everything as being blissful will automatically give rise to the experience of non-thought (mi rtog pa, nirvikalpa)."

=== Gelug lineage ===
In Tsongkhapa's system, inner heat is the foundation stone for the whole six dharmas (along with meditation on emptiness). Every time one practices one of these six dharmas, one must first generate inner heat, along with the four blisses and merge this with meditation on emptiness. Once mastered, tummo is then applied to the practice of illusory body, and based on illusory body yoga, one practices radiance/clear light yoga.

Tsongkhapa's commentary The Three Inspirations, divides the practice of inner heat into three main components:

- Meditating on the channels; one first visualizes the three channels (right is red, left is white and central channel is blue) and then the four chakras at the crown (multicolored with 32 petals), throat (red with 16 petals), heart (white with 6 petals) and below the navel (red with 64 petals). One fixes the mind on each chakra and with practice they become increasingly clear. If this is too difficult, one can just meditate on the channels first, or on the point where they meet below the navel. The goal is to achieve a stable clarity of the radiant appearance of the channels and chakras for a prolonged period of time. One can also join this practice with the vase breathing exercise (i.e. kumbhaka) and with the hollow body visualization.
- Meditating on mantric seed syllables on the center of each chakra; Tsongkhapa states: "one should concentrate on the syllables of the upper three chakras for just a short period of time, and then dedicate most of the session to meditating on the Ah-stroke at the navel chakra." The other syllables are: An upside down white Haṃ at the crown chakra, an upside down blue Hūṃ ཧཱུྃ at the heart chakra, a red Oṃ ཨོཾ at the throat chakra. The seed syllables should be visualized as tiny like the size of a mustard seed, though Tsongkhapa states that one can start imagining them as larger than that and then shrink them.
- Meditation on the chakras, syllables and channels joined with the vase breathing technique. To practice vase breath, breathe a long deep breath through the nose. Then swallow and press down with the abdomen. Retains the air for as long as possible. Then one releases the breath gently and quietly. According to Tsongkhapa, until some progress has been made in this practice, one should practice gently without forcefulness. There should be no discomfort. One should also practice on an empty stomach.

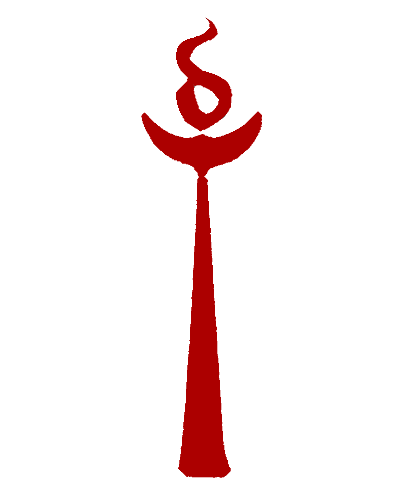
The Ah stroke syllable as taught in Gelug

Tsongkhapa describes the outcome of the full method (with all three elements described above practiced at once) as follows:

Then the energies residing in the chakra at the secret place cause the AH-stroke syllable at the navel chakra, which is in nature the inner fire, to blaze with light. This light rises up the central channel avadhuti and melts the other three syllables, HAM, OM and HUM [respectively at the crown, throat and heart chakras]. These melt and fall into the syllable AH [at the navel chakra]. The four become of one inseparable nature. One then fixes the mind on the drop [formed by this fusion], the nature of which is the innate ecstasy. If one can do so, then from the drop comes the tongue of a tiny flame of the inner heat. One fixes the mind on it. Light from this flame rises up the central channel, where it melts the drop of white bodhimind substance abiding within the crown chakra. This drips down like nectar, filling the AH-stroke mantric syllable at the navel chakra. One meditates single-pointedly on the AH-stroke, until the signs of stability arise. When meditative stability has been achieved then the radiance of the light from the inner fire will illuminate the inside and outside of one's body, as well as one's dwelling place and so forth, rendering them as transparent as a piece of kyurura fruit held in the hand.

This practice will cause the vital winds to enter the central channel. Tsongkhapa describes various signs that this has occurred, mainly that the breath flows smoothly and evenly through the nostrils, then it becomes increasingly subtle, and then it stops altogether.

Tummo practice is also said to generate the four blisses. Tsongkhapa explains that the first bliss arises when the energy drop in the crown chakra is melted when the vital winds are brought to the crown by tummo. When the energies reach the throat, this is the second bliss ("supreme bliss"), when they reach the heart, the third bliss arises ("special bliss") and when they reach the navel, the fourth "innate bliss" arises. If one can hold the mind at the chakras for extended periods, one will gain the ability to control the movement of the energy drops. Then one can also bring the drop back up the central channel, experiencing the blisses again but starting from the navel chakra. One then continues to practice by moving the drop up and down the central channel, experiencing the four descending and the four rising blisses again and again.

To meditate on innate wisdom, one lets the drop melt all the way down to the chakra at the secret place ("tip of the jewel"). Then one meditates on emptiness and rests in that ecstasy - emptiness meditation. Then one brings the drop back to the crown chakra, which meditates on "the sphere of ecstasy conjoined with emptiness."

Tsongkhapa further states: "During the post-meditation periods one must consciously cultivate mindfulness of the experience of ecstasy and emptiness, and stamp all objects and events that appear and occur with the seal of this ecstasy and emptiness. This application causes a special ecstasy to be ignited, which one should foster."

== Scientific investigation ==
Studies on Tibetan monks and a Western control group have demonstrated the effect of increased thermal power output using the forceful breath technique that depends in part on meditative visualization.

In a 1982 study by Benson et al. three monks, who were practitioners of tummo yoga, were researched. All three monks had been practicing tummo for six years on a daily basis. On top of that, they lived in barely insulated, unheated stone sheds. Their skin temperature was measured at different points, namely, around the navel, the lower back, the chest, the left forearm, the left fifth fingernail bed, and lastly, the forehead. In the first monk a temperature increase of 5.9°C was registered in his finger during a 55-minute tummo practice; the toe temperature increased by 7°C; the air temperature went up from 22°C to 23.5°C. Finger temperature in the second monk increased by 7.2°C, the toe temperature increased by 4.0°C; the air temperature increased from 16°C to 19.2°C. In the third monk a temperature increase of 3.15°C was registered in his finger; toe temperature increased by 8.3°C; the room temperature decreased from 20°C to 18.5°C but then increased again to 19.5°C. These results showcase that the practice of tummo yoga can lead to large increases in toe and finger temperature.

In a 2002 experiment reported by the Harvard Gazette, conducted in Normandy, France, two monks from the Buddhist tradition wore sensors that recorded changes in heat production and metabolism. However, this study has not been published in a peer-reviewed scientific journal and has been criticized by peers: "The visual effect of steaming sheets reported by eye-witnesses of the g-tummo ceremony cannot be taken as evidence of elevated body temperature. Wet sheets wrapped around a practitioner's body would steam and dry due to the significant temperature difference between the wet sheets (heated by a human body) and the cold air outside, even if the practitioners simply maintain their normal body temperature."

A 2013 study by Kozhevnikov and colleagues showed increases in core body temperature in both expert meditators from eastern Tibet and Western non-meditators. The expert meditators using tummo visualization and exercises were able to increase body temperature the most. This study researched the effects of tummo combined with the visualization practice that accompanies the traditional technique compared with tummo yoga in which the breathing technique alone is implicated. The participants in the traditional tummo-practicing group were expert meditators from a monastery in eastern Tibet. The participants in the breathing technique-only group were from a Western background and did not have experience like the traditional group. However the Western group did have experience with several other forms of yoga. For the traditional tummo-practicing group the years of experience ranged from 6 to 32 years. EEG activity, left fifth finger temperature, and core body temperature were measured in 4 different conditions for the traditional practice group. The conditions were 1) baseline forceful breathing, where participants were asked to breathe and perform in the way in which they would normally during forceful breathing, but without the visualization, 2) baseline gentle breathing, where participants performed gentle breathing as usual, but without the visualization, 3) meditation forceful breathing, where participants performed forceful breathing along with the visualization practice, and 4) meditation gentle breathing, where the participants practiced gentle breathing along with the visualization practice.

The participants in the Western group received extensive instruction in the techniques involved in the performance of the different forms of breathing used in the practice of tummo, after which all the participants in the Western group practiced these tummo techniques for about 45–60 minutes, during which time their temperatures were measured. In the traditional condition rises in temperature varying from 1.2°C to 6.8°C were observed. It was also discovered that when those in the traditional condition also applied their visualisation techniques, the rise in temperature could be sustained for a longer period of time. In those in the Western condition, temperatures rose to the same degree as that observed in those in the traditional condition. These findings reveal that, when tummo is practiced in the right form, both experienced and newly trained practitioners are able to raise their body temperature. When, in addition, visualisation methods are implemented, this rise in temperature can be maintained for a longer period of time.

== See also ==
- Kapalabhati
