= Tögal =

Dzogchen visual meditation practice

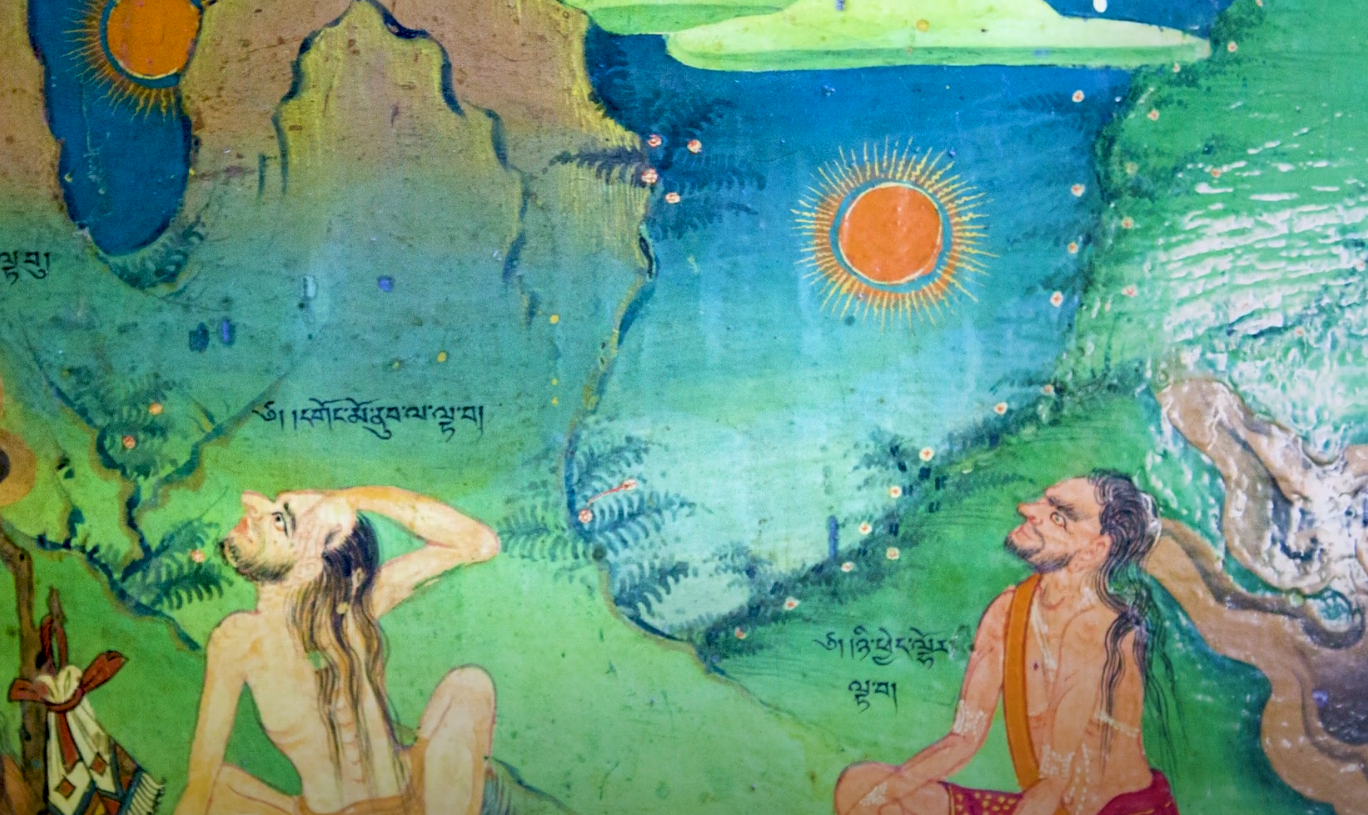
Lukhang Temple mural depicting sky gazing visionary practice

In Dzogchen, tögal (Tibetan: ཐོད་རྒལ་, Wylie: thod rgal) literally means "crossing, surpassing the skull." It is sometimes translated as 'leapover,' 'direct crossing,' or 'direct transcendence.' Tögal is also called "the practice of vision," or "the practice of the Clear Light" (od-gsal).

== Definition ==
Vimalamitra's Great Commentary, defines tögal as "the practice of the direct perception of pristine consciousness" which is for "the diligent who gradually attain buddhahood through meditation." Chökyi Nyima Rinpoche glosses the term as "to proceed directly to the goal without having to go through intermediate steps." Jigme Lingpa follows Longchenpa in seeing the visionary practice of tögal as the highest level of meditation practice. Tögal is also called "the practice of vision", or "the practice of the Clear Light (od-gsal)".

== Practice ==
Tögal is practiced in a completely dark setting or through sky gazing. The practices engage the subtle body of psychic channels, winds and drops (rtsa rlung thig le). These practices aim at generating a spontaneous flow of luminous, rainbow-colored images (such as thigles or circles of rainbow light) that gradually expand in extent and complexity. The meditator uses these to recognize his mind's nature. According to Hatchell, these visionary yogic techniques:

[...] are based on the idea that pure awareness is locked away in the body’s core, localized at the heart. A set of luminous energy channels then run from the heart to the eyes, acting as pathways through which awareness can travel and exit the body. Based on special yogic techniques, awareness can be induced to emerge from the eyes and light up into visionary appearances. This provides an opportunity for recognition: for the yogi to realize that the visionary appearances “out there” are none other than presencings of an internal awareness, and thus to undo the basic error of ignorance.

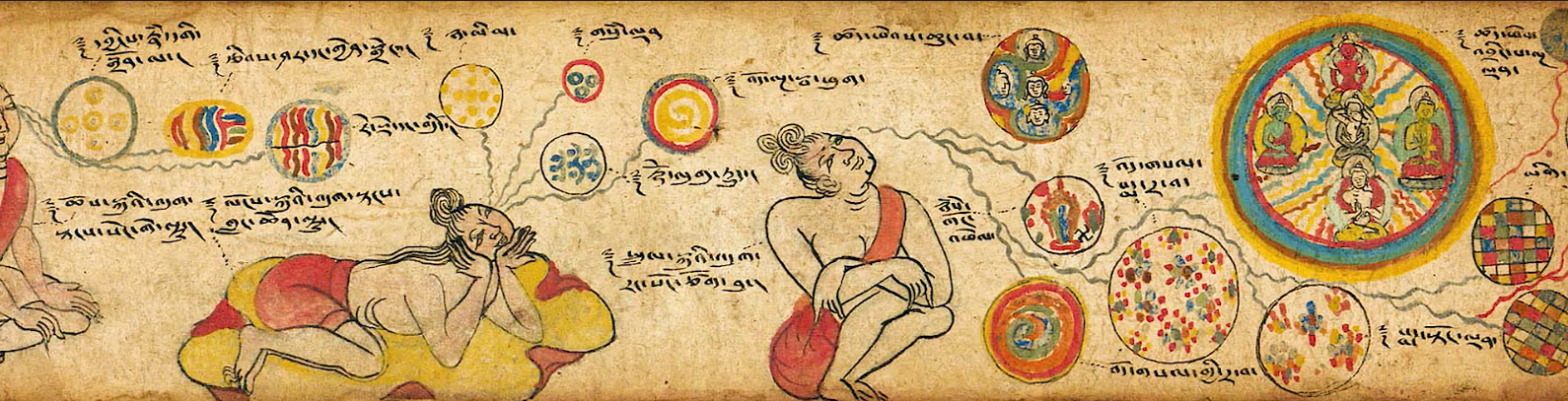
Tibetan depictions of tögal visions

=== Four visions ===
The practice of tögal entails progressing through the "Four Visions" (snang ba bzhi), which are:

1. "The Absolute Nature Becoming Manifest" or "The Vision of Awareness' Immediacy" - This refers to initial visions of lights in the visual field, such as circles called thigle, and "linked chains of spots".
2. "The Experience of Increasing Appearances" or "The Vision of the Intensification of Experience" - According to Hatchell, in this stage "visionary experience becomes more intense. The number, shape, and size of the appearances increase, and they begin to assemble together in simple configurations."
3. "Awareness Reaching its Greatest Magnitude" or "The Vision of Awareness' Optimization" - Hatchell writes that "at this stage, the abstract lights begin to organize themselves, ultimately taking shape as a mandala of 100 peaceful and wrathful deities."
4. "The Exhaustion of Phenomena in Dharmata" or "The Vision of Exhaustion within Reality" - In this final vision, appearances dissolve back into the expanse and fade away.

== See also ==
- Rigpa
- Trekchö
- Trul khor
