= Lamrim Yeshe Nyingpo =

Type of terma

Lamrim Yeshe Nyingpo is a terma revealed by Chokgyur Lingpa in the nineteenth century.

The Light of Wisdom (1999) is an extended exegesis on the Lamrim Yeshe Nyingpo by Jamgön Kongtrül the Great, one of the eminent Buddhist masters of nineteenth-century Tibet.
