= Rigpa =

Concept within Tibetan Buddhism

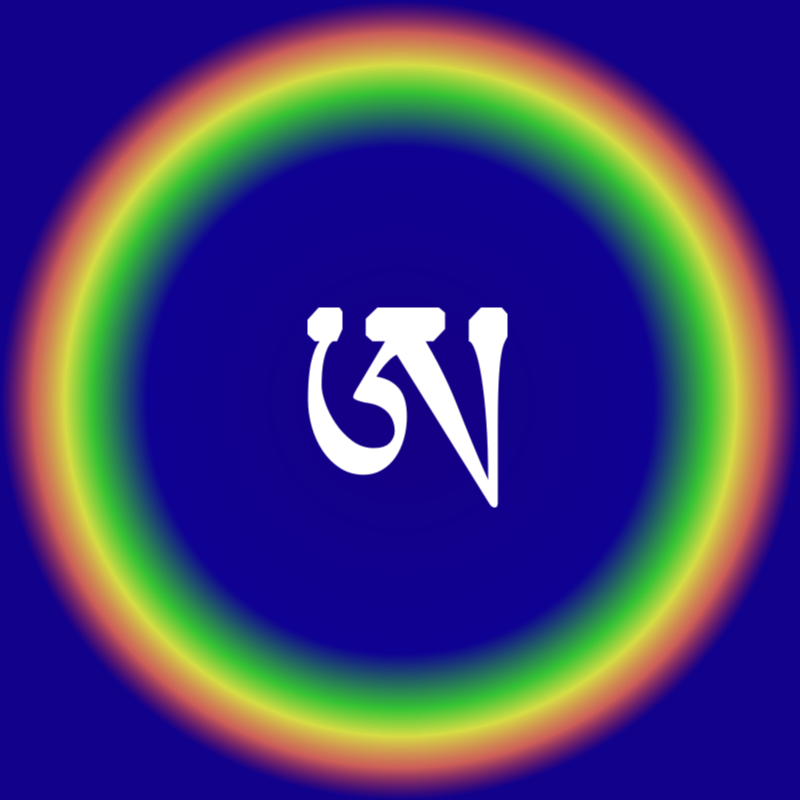
Tibetan letter "A" inside a thigle. The A, which corresponds to the sound ‘ahh’, represents kadag while the thigle represents lhun grub.

In Dzogchen, rigpa (Tibetan: རིག་པ་, Wylie: rig pa; Skt. vidyā; "knowledge") is knowledge of the ground, the primordial state of any sentient being. The opposite of rigpa is ma rigpa (avidyā, ignorance). A practitioner who has attained the state of rigpa and is able to rest in it continuously is called a Rigdzin or Rigma (see Vidyadhara), which may be used as a title either pre- or post-nominally.

== Rigpa (knowledge) ==
Rigpa (Sanskrit: vidyā, 'knowledge') is a central concept in Dzogchen. According to Ācārya Malcolm Smith:

A text from the Heart Essence of Vimalamitra called the Lamp Summarizing Vidyā (Rig pa bsdus pa’i sgronma) defines vidyā in the following way: "...vidyā is knowing, clear, and unchanging" In Sanskrit, the term vidyā and all its cognates imply consciousness, knowing, knowledge, science, intelligence, and so on. Simply put, vidyā means unconfused knowledge of the basis that is its own state.

Rigpa is the knowledge of the ground. It has also come to mean the 'pristine awareness' that is the fundamental ground itself. Erik Pema Kunsang translates a text which provides basic definitions of rigpa and ma rigpa in a Dzogchen context:

Unknowing (marigpa) is not knowing the nature of mind. Knowing (rigpa) is the knowing of the original wakefulness that is personal experience.

Rigpa has two aspects, namely kadag and lhun grub. Kadag means "purity" or specifically "primordial purity". Lhun grub in Tibetan normally implies automatic, self-caused or spontaneous actions or processes. As quality of rigpa it means 'spontaneous presence' It may also mean 'having a self-contained origin', being primordially existent, without an origin, self-existent. This division is the Dzogchen equivalent of the more common Mahayana wisdom and compassion division.

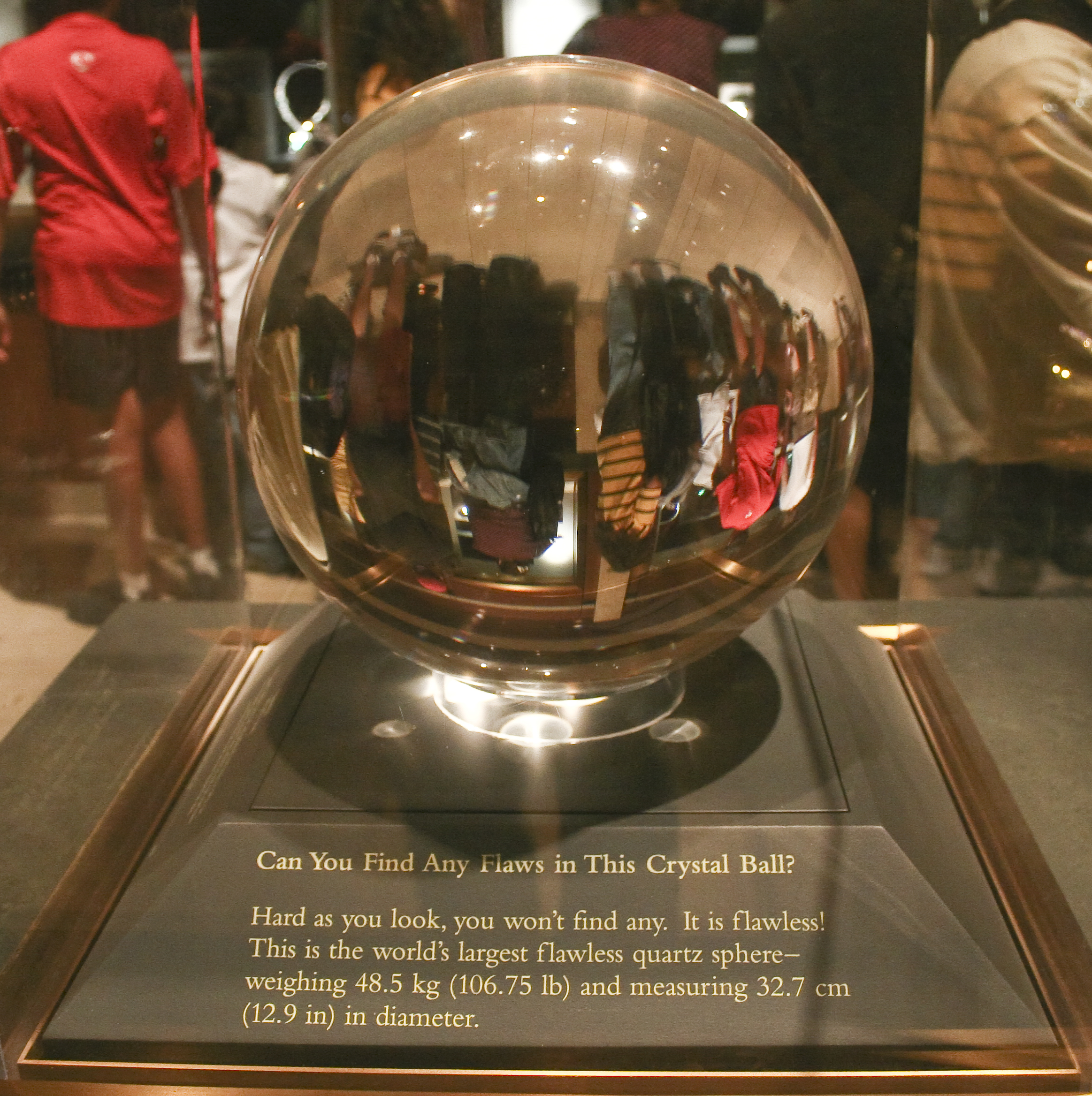
Rigpa is often explained through the metaphor of a crystal or a crystal ball

Closely related terms are ye shes (Skt. jñāna, pristine consciousness) which is "the original, unadulterated state of consciousness" and wisdom (shes rab, Skt. prajña). Rigpa is also described as "reflexively self-aware primordial wisdom." (Note: "[...] the essence and base of self-arisen wisdom is the allbase, that primordial open awareness is the base, and that recognition of this base is not separate from the primordial wisdom itself [...] that open awareness is itself authentic and its authenticity is a function of it being aware of, or recognizing itself as, the base [...] The reflexively self-aware primordial wisdom is itself open awareness (rigpa), inalienably one with unbounded wholeness.") Thus, wisdom is nothing other than rigpa. The analogy given by Dzogchen masters is that one's true nature is like a mirror which reflects with complete openness, but is not affected by the reflections; or like a crystal ball that takes on the colour of the material on which it is placed without itself being changed. The knowledge that ensues from recognizing this mirror-like clarity (which cannot be found by searching nor identified) is called rigpa.

Sam van Schaik translates rigpa as "gnosis" which he glosses as "a form of awareness aligned to the nirvanic state, free from all delusion". He notes that other definitions of rigpa include "free from elaborations" (srpos bral), "non conceptual" (rtog med) and "transcendent of the intellect" (blo 'das). It is also often paired with emptiness, as in the contraction rig stong (gnosis-emptiness).

The unconditioned nature of rigpa is described in the Longchen Nyingthig as follows:

Not constructed by excellent buddhas, nor changed by lowly sentient beings, this unfabricated gnosis of the present moment, is the reflexive luminosity, naked and stainless, the Primordial Lord himself.

John W. Pettit notes that rigpa is seen as beyond affirmation and negation, acceptance and rejection, and therefore it is known as "natural" (ma bcos pa) and "effortless" (rtsol med) once recognized. Because of this, Dzogchen is also known as the pinnacle and final destination of all paths.

Ācārya Malcolm Smith also notes that the atemporal nature of the basis also applies to the presence of the basis in sentient beings as rigpa:

Since time is not a factor when it comes to the analysis of the basis, Great Perfection texts can define the liberation of sentient beings as timeless, meaning that the state of liberation is their unconditioned essential state. It is not something to gain; it is something to discover. More importantly, the basis is buddhahood and functions as buddhahood.

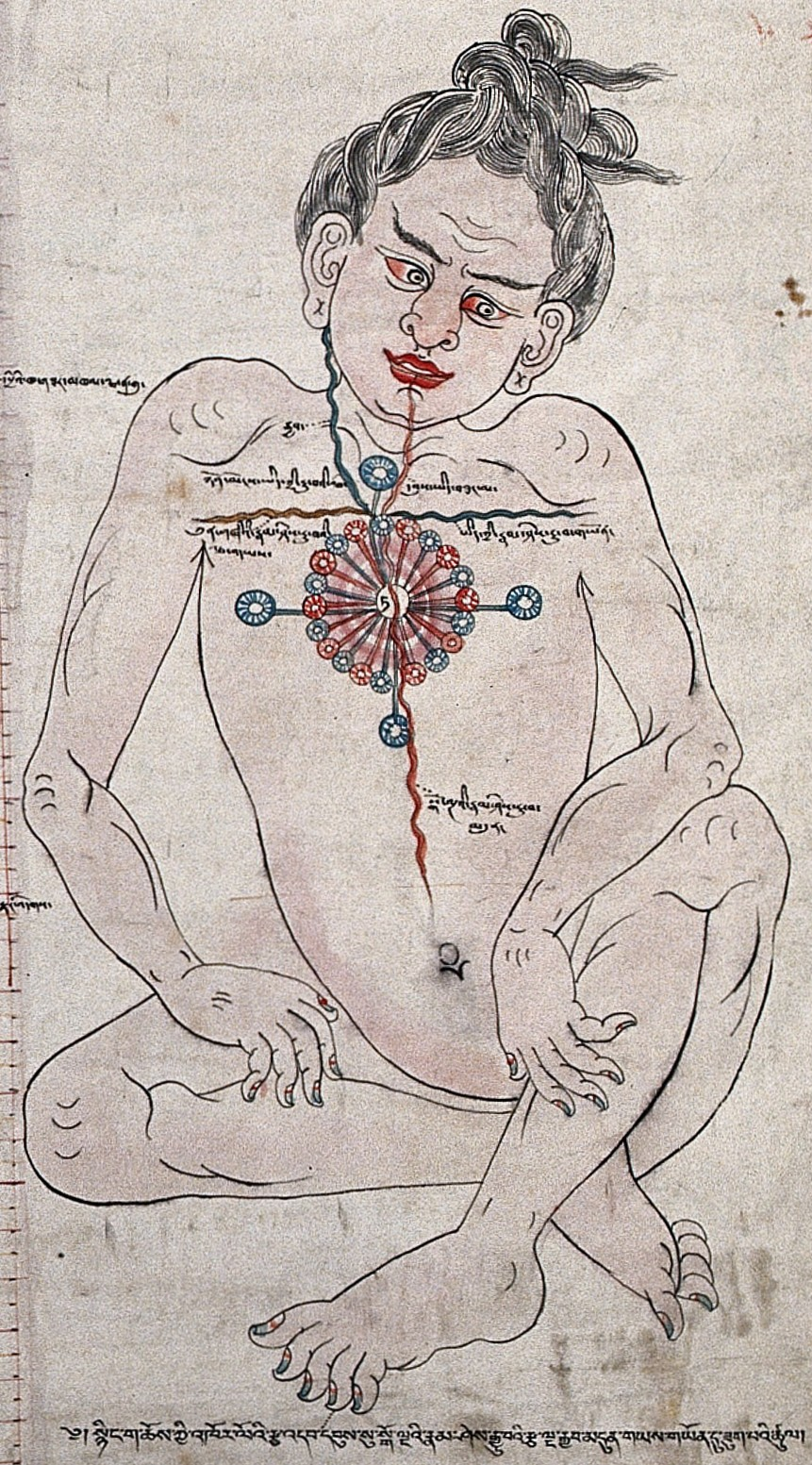
A depiction of the heart centre from a Tibetan Medicine text

As Alexander Berzin notes, all of the good qualities (yon-tan) of a Buddha already "are innate (lhan-skyes) to rigpa, which means that they arise simultaneously with each moment of rigpa, and primordial (gnyugs-ma), in the sense of having no beginning."

Dzogchen texts refer to the basis and its rigpa as it is present in sentient beings as the sugatagarbha. Vimalamitra's Commentary states that "because the aim of buddhahood exists in the manner of a seed in the pristine consciousness of one’s vidyā, there is definitely success through practice."

Dzogchen texts also describe how rigpa is connected to the energy body. Dzogchen tantras explain that rigpa can be located in the center of the human body, in the heart centre. The Realms and Transformations of Sound Tantra states: "The jewel present within the heart in the center of one’s body is great pristine consciousness."

Furthermore, the Self-Arisen Vidyā Tantra states:

The transcendent state of the perfect buddhas is supported. It is supported on the material aggregate, for example, like an eagle sleeping in its nest. It has a location. It is located in the heart, for example, like a figure in a vase.

Dzogchen tantras also discuss the related topic of the energy body, mainly the nāḍīs, vāyus, and bindus (rtsa, rlung, and thig le; channels, winds and circles).

=== Immanence ===
According to Van Schaik, there is a certain tension in Dzogchen thought (as in other forms of Buddhism) between the idea that samsara and nirvana are immanent within each other and yet are still different. In texts such as the Longchen Nyingtig for example, the basis and rigpa are presented as being "intrinsically innate to the individual mind" and not "as states to be attained or developed."

The Great Perfection Tantra of the Expanse of Samantabhadra’s Wisdom, using the Adi-Buddha Samantabhadra as a symbol for enlightenment, states:

If you think that he who is called "the heart essence of all buddhas, the Primordial Lord, the noble Victorious One, Samantabhadra" is contained in a mindstream separate from the ocean-like realm of sentient beings, then this is a nihilistic view in which samsara and nirvana remain unconnected.

Likewise, Longchenpa (14th century) writes in his Illuminating Sunlight:

Every type of experiential content belonging to samsara and nirvana has, as its very basis, a natural state that is a spontaneously present buddha—a dimension of purity and perfection, that is perfect by nature. This natural state is not created by a profound buddha nor by a clever sentient being. Independent of causality, causes did not produce it and conditions can not make it perish. This state is one of self-existing wakefulness, defying all that words can describe, in a way that also transcends the reach of the intellect and thoughts. It is within the nonarising vastness of such a basic natural state that all phenomena belonging to samsara and nirvana are, essentially and without any exception, a state of buddha—purity and perfection.

In the Longdé texts (and in other works), a common term used to denote the immanent enlightened nature is bodhicitta (byang chub sems).

This lack of difference between these two states, their non-dual (advaya) nature, corresponds with the idea that change from one to another doesn't happen due to an ordinary process of causation but is an instantaneous and perfect 'self-recognition' (rang ngo sprod) of what is already innately (lhan-skyes) there. According to John W. Pettit, this idea has its roots in Indian texts such as Nagarjuna's Mulamadhyamakakarika, which states that samsara and nirvana are not separate and that there is no difference between the "doer", the "going" and the "going to" (i.e. the ground, path and fruit).

=== Practice ===
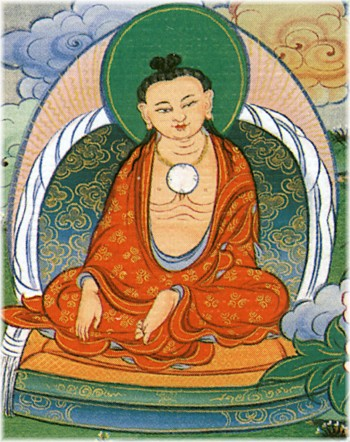
Melong Dorje, wearing a melong (mirror), which is a symbol of kadag

Dzogchen practices aim to attain rigpa and integrate this into everyday life:

The practical training of the Dzogchen path is traditionally, and most simply, described in terms of View, Meditation and Action. To see directly the Absolute state, the Ground of our being is the View; the way of stabilising that view, and making it an unbroken experience is Meditation; and integrating the View into our entire reality, and life, is what is meant by Action.

The Menngagde or 'Instruction Class' of Dzogchen teachings are divided into two parts: trekchö and tögal (thod rgal). Ron Garry:

The practice is that of Cutting through Solidity (khregs chod), which is related to primordial purity (kadag); and Direct Vision of Reality (thod rgal), which is related to spontaneous presence (Ihun grub).

In Dzogchen, a fundamental point of practice is to distinguish rigpa from sems (citta, (grasping) mind). According to the 14th Dalai Lama, "sems is the mind which is temporarily obscured and distorted by thoughts based upon the dualistic perceptions of subject and object." Rigpa is pure awareness free from such distortions. Cittata, the nature of mind, is the inseparable unity of awareness and emptiness, or clarity and emptiness, which is the basis for all the ordinary perceptions, thoughts and emotions of the ordinary mind.

Citing Dodrupchen Jikme Tenpe Nyima, the 14th Dalai Lama states the full measure of rigpa occurs with the third vision.

== Ma rigpa (ignorance) ==
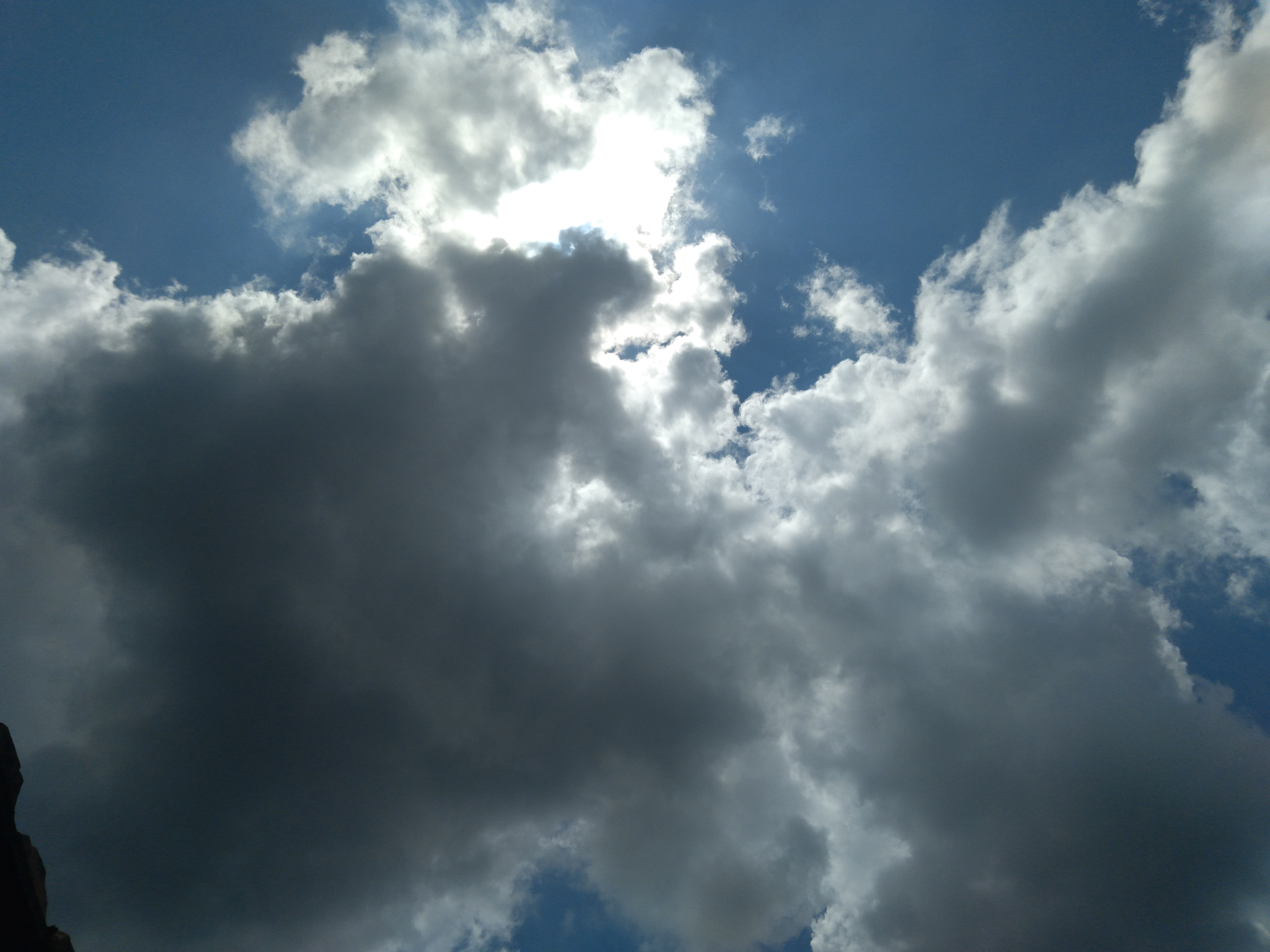
A widespread simile for ignorance is the obscuration of the sun by clouds

Ma rigpa (avidyā) is the opposite of rigpa or knowledge. Ma rigpa is ignorance, delusion or unawareness, the failure to recognize the nature of the basis. An important theme in Dzogchen texts is explaining how ignorance arises from the basis or Dharmata, which is associated with ye shes or pristine consciousness. Automatically arising unawareness (lhan-skyes ma-rigpa) exists because the basis has a natural cognitive potentiality which gives rise to appearances. This is the ground for samsara and nirvana.

When consciousness fails to recognize that all phenomena arise as the creativity (rtsal) of the nature of mind and misses its own luminescence or does not "recognize its own face", sentient beings arise instead of Buddhas. Ma rigpa is explained in Vimalamitra's Great Commentary as follows:

Delusion arises from the difference between the basis and the conscious aspect of the basis. Apart from generally pervading, the so-called “basis” is totally undifferentiated, without any consideration of delusion or nondelusion. That so-called “knower” (rig pa po) or “mind” (the special assertion of a consciousness demonstrated in our own texts) is deluded.

According to Vimalamitra's Illuminating Lamp, delusion arises because sentient beings "lapse towards external mentally apprehended objects". This external grasping is then said to produce sentient beings out of dependent origination. This dualistic conceptualizing process which leads to samsara is termed manas as well as "awareness moving away from the ground". However, some beings do not lapse into dualism by externalizing their own display and instead immediately recognize all phenomena which arise from the basis as the insubstantial appearances of their own nature. These beings immediately become Buddhas.

Thus, out of the basis, sentient beings arise due to ignorance/delusion, while Buddhas arise due to recognition and wisdom. As Tulku Urgyen Rinpoche notes, a sentient being is "empty cognizance suffused with ignorance" while the mind of a Buddha is "empty cognizance suffused with rigpa".

Longchenpa explains the process of how rigpa (rendered here as "gnosis") lapses into ignorance in his Tsigdön Dzö as follows:

General delusion is caused by the stain of gnosis not recognizing the manifest ground, through which gnosis itself becomes polluted with delusion. Though gnosis itself is without the stains of cognition, it becomes endowed with stains, and through its becoming enveloped in the seal of mind, the gnosis of the ever-pure essence is polluted by conceptualization. Chained by the sixfold manas, it is covered with the net of the body of partless atoms, and the luminosity becomes latent.

=== Three kinds of ignorance ===
The Seminal Heart texts posits "three kinds of ignorance" (ma rig pa gsum), which according to Higgins are "three progressive phases of error":

- Ignorance of single identity that is the cause (bdag nyid gcig pa'i ma rig pa), the most fundamental ignorance and the source of all error. It is the primordial failure to recognize the single source of rigpa and ma rigpa, i.e. the nondual empty Essence of the Basis.
- Co-emergent ignorance (lhan cig skyes pa'i ma rig pa), which is related to not seeing arising appearances as they really are. It is the failure to recognize the Nature of the Basis (i.e. clarity) which arises simultaneously together with cognition.
- Conceptually elaborated ignorance (kun tu brtags pa’i ma rig pa), also known as imputed ignorance and relates to the imputation of false and dualistic concepts onto appearances, particularly related to "self" and "other".

Longchenpa explains the three forms of ignorance as follows:

During the arising of the ground-manifestation, the clear and knowing cognition as the expressive energy of compassionate responsiveness (thugs rje) [i.e. the dynamic aspect of the ground] manifests in close affiliation with the three kinds of ignorance because it fails to directly recognize that it itself is what appears as able to discriminate amongst objects. These three aspects are as follows: [A] ignorance of single identity as the cause consists in not recognizing that all cognitions are of the same identical nature; [B] co-emergent ignorance consists in the fact that this non-self-recognition (rang ngo ma shes pa) and cognition (shes pa) arise together; and [C] conceptually elaborated ignorance consists in discriminating self-manifestation as something other [than oneself].

== Samsara and nirvana ==
As Sam van Schaik notes, for authors like Longchenpa and Jigme Lingpa, the basis has the potential to manifest in both a samsaric and a nirvanic modes. Therefore, even though rigpa is immanent, in sentient beings this rigpa is an unripened rigpa which often manifests as ordinary consciousness (shes pa) and which may become deluded if it does not recognize its own nature. Buddhahood is attained through the recognition of rigpa (rig pa'i ngo sprod) or self-recognition (rang ngo sprod) of what is immanently present.

Seminal Heart texts also indicate a subtle difference between terms associated with delusion (such as kun gzhi or alaya, and sems or mind) and terms associated with full enlightenment (Dharmakaya and rigpa). These terms stem from Indian Yogacara texts. In the Seminal Heart literature, the Ālaya and the Ālayavijñāna are associated with karmic imprints (vasana) of the mind and with mental afflictions (klesa). The "alaya for habits" is the basis (gzhi) together with ignorance (ma rigpa), which includes all sorts of obscuring habits and grasping tendencies. Thus, the Longchen Nyingthig compares the Ālaya to muddy water (which hides the brightness of wisdom and rigpa) and defines it as non-recognition, while the Dharmakaya is compared to clear water and defined as "undeluded awareness".

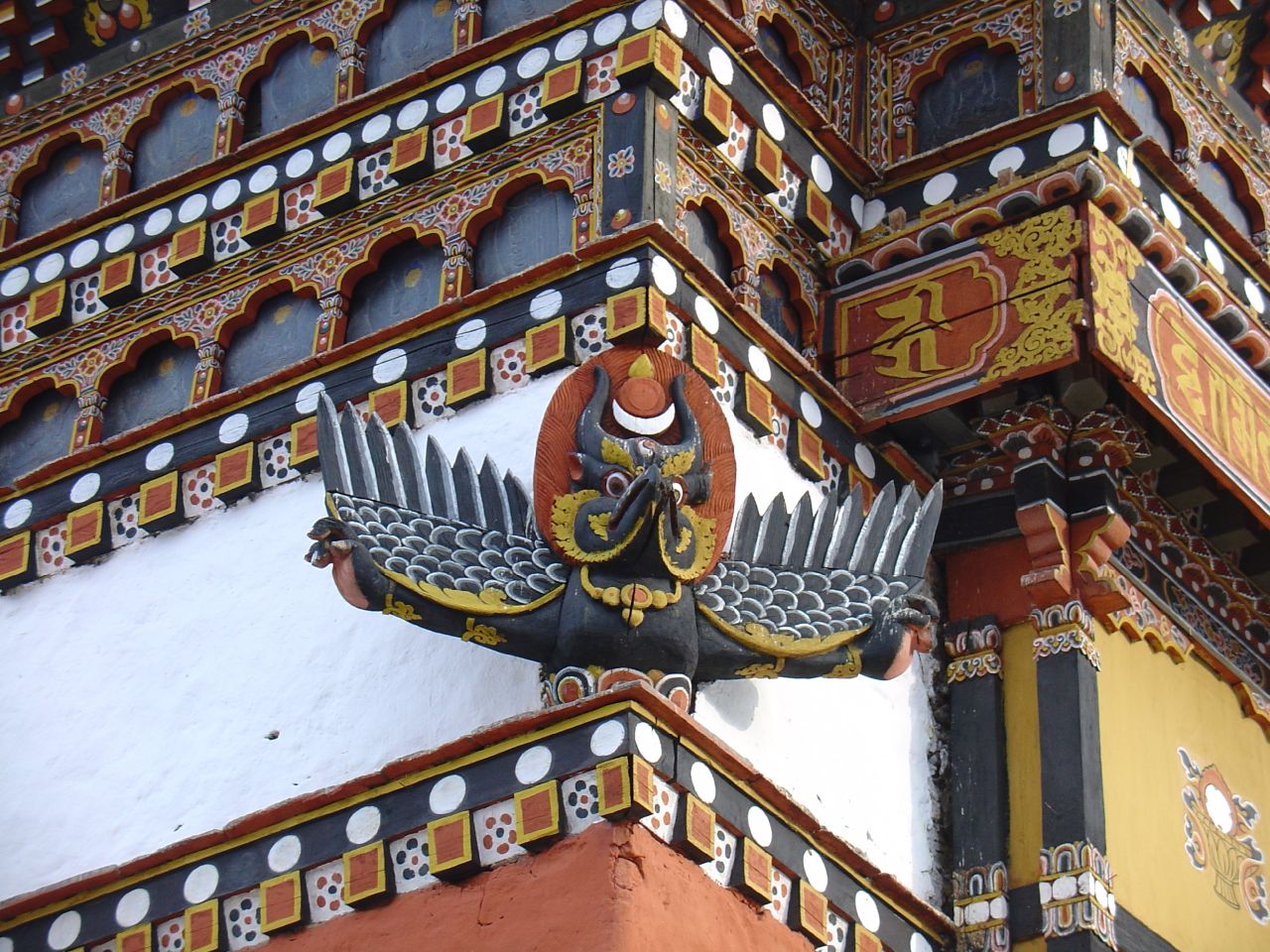
The Garuda is used as a symbol of primordial nature, which is already completely perfect, since this mythological animal is said to be born fully grown.

Regarding sems (mind) and rigpa (gnosis), the Longchen Nyingthig compares them to air and space respectively:

Mind and gnosis are like air and space. Mind is the aspect of deceptive objects of fixation, vividly filling up, swirling round, and pouring out again, or briefly becoming agitated like a hurricane. Its foundation is the condition for the various sensations. Gnosis is without supports and all-pervasive. In its emptiness it opens up as the space-like expanse; In its luminosity it is nonconceptual and radiant like a polished crystal. Thus the essential point of the Seminal Heart is to hold a secure place in the natural state, utterly liberated from mind in the expanse of gnosis.

Longchenpa explains the difference thus:

In brief, ‘‘mind and mental factors’’ refer to the arising of conceptualization and analysis of objects that is ostensibly causally produced by the subject-object dichotomy. ‘‘Primordial knowing’’ [ye shes] refers to a simple object awareness in which the subject-object dichotomy has completely subsided. (Sems nyid ngal gso ’grel, 132.5.)

== Relationship with Indian Buddhist philosophies ==
Koppl notes that although later Nyingma authors such as Mipham attempted to harmonize the view of Dzogchen with Madhyamaka, the earlier Nyingma author Rongzom Chokyi Zangpo did not. (Note: Heidi Koppl: "Unlike Mipham, Rongzom did not attempt to harmonize the view of Mantra or Dzogchen with Madhyamaka.") Rongzom held that the views of sutra such as Madhyamaka were inferior to that of tantra. (Note: Heidi Koppl: "By now we have seen that Rongzom regards the views of the Sutrayana as inferior to those of Mantra, and he underscores his commitment to the purity of all phenomena by criticizing the Madhyamaka objectification of the authentic relative truth.") In contrast, the 14th Dalai Lama, in his book Dzogchen, concludes that Madhyamaka and Dzogchen come down to the same point. The view of reality obtained through Madhyamaka philosophy and the Dzogchen view of Rigpa can be regarded as identical. With regard to the practice in these traditions, however, at the initial stages there do seem certain differences in practice and emphasis.

According to Malcolm Smith, the Dzogchen view is also based on the Indian Buddhist Buddha-nature doctrine of the Tathāgatagarbha sūtras. According to the 14th Dalai Lama the Ground is the Buddha-nature, the nature of mind which is emptiness. According to Thrangu Rinpoche, Rangjung Dorje (1284–1339), the third Karmapa Lama (head of the Karma Kagyu) and Nyingma lineage holder, also stated that the Ground is Buddha-nature. (Note: Rangjung Dorje also influenced Dolpopa. In 1321 the famous scholar Dolpopa (1292–1361) visited Tsurphu Monastery for the first time and had extensive discussions with Rangjung Dorje about doctrinal issues. It appears that Rangjung Dorje almost certainly influenced the development of some of Dolpopa's theories, possibly including his Zhentong (gzhan stong) method.) According to Thrangu Rinpoche, "whether one does Mahamudra or Dzogchen practice, buddha nature is the foundation from which both of these meditations develop."

== See also ==
- Bare attention
- Buddha-nature
- Choiceless awareness
- Kensho
- Luminous mind
- Mahamudra
- Rigpa (organization)
- Sahaja
- Samprajaña, apramāda and atappa
- Tsa lung
- Turiya
- Wisdom in Buddhism
