= Lukhang =

Buddhist temple in Tibet

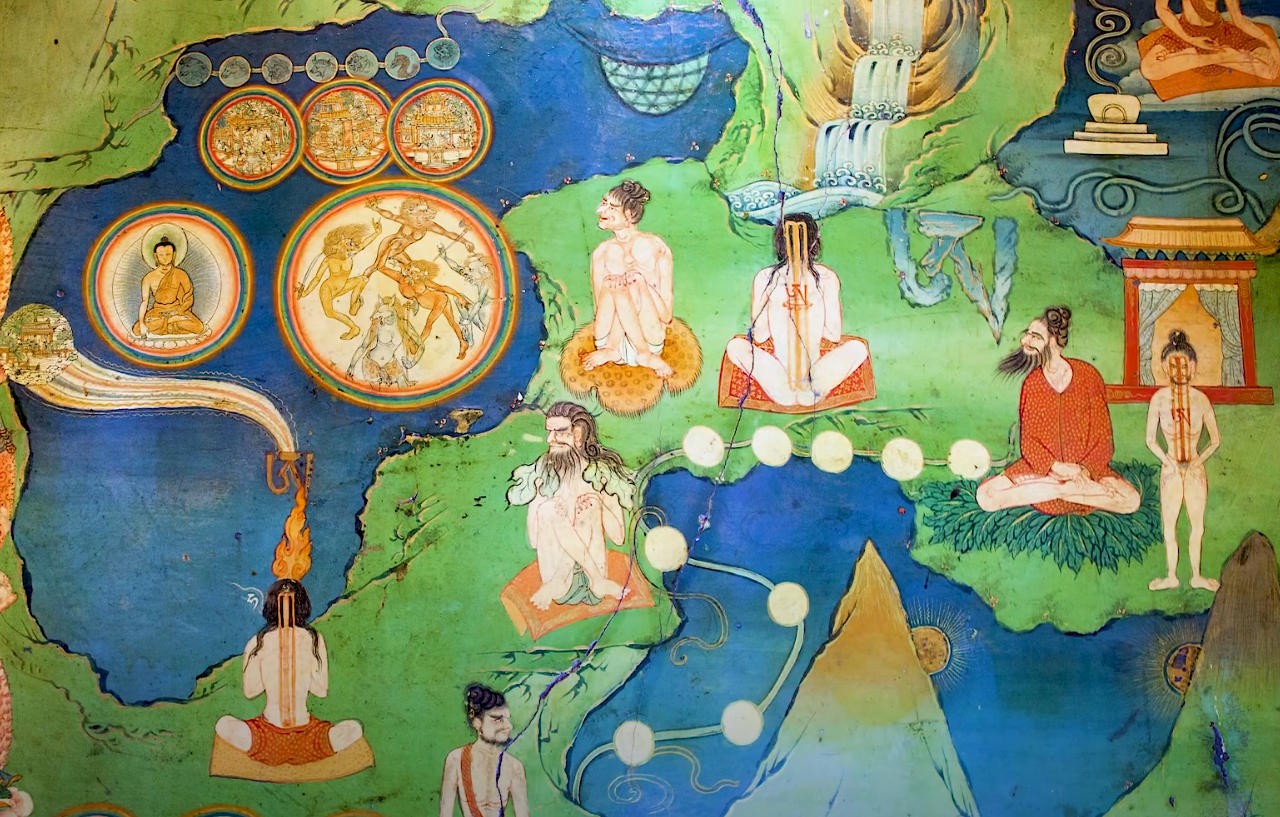
Lukhang Temple mural depicting Dzogchen anuyoga practices such as tummo which work with the subtle body channels

Lukhang (Tibetan: ཀླུ་ཁང, Wylie: klu khang, residence of Nagas), formally Dzongyab Lukhang (Tibetan: རྫོང་རྒྱབ་ཀླུ་ཁང, Wylie: rdzong rgyab klu khang), residence of Nagas, is the name of a secret temple of Lozang Gyatso, 5th Dalai Lama. Three walls of the temple are covered with murals of yogis engaged in their exercises.

- One wall of murals illustrates a commentary by Longchenpa on a Dzogchen tantra Rigpa Rangshar, interpreted according to the 5th Dalai Lama's experience of practice. The murals show characteristic visions of the secret practice of tögal.
- Another wall shows eight manifestations of Guru Padmasambhava and eighty four main Mahasiddhas.
- The third wall illustrates positions and movements of Yantra Yoga.

The temple is situated on a small island on a lake behind the Potala palace in Lhasa.
