= Trul khor =

Vajrayana discipline of breath and body

Tibetan name
- Tibetan: རྩ་རླུང་འཁྲུལ་འཁོར་
- Literal meaning: magical movement instrument, channels and inner breath currents
Transcriptions
- Wylie: rtsa-rlung 'phrul-'khor

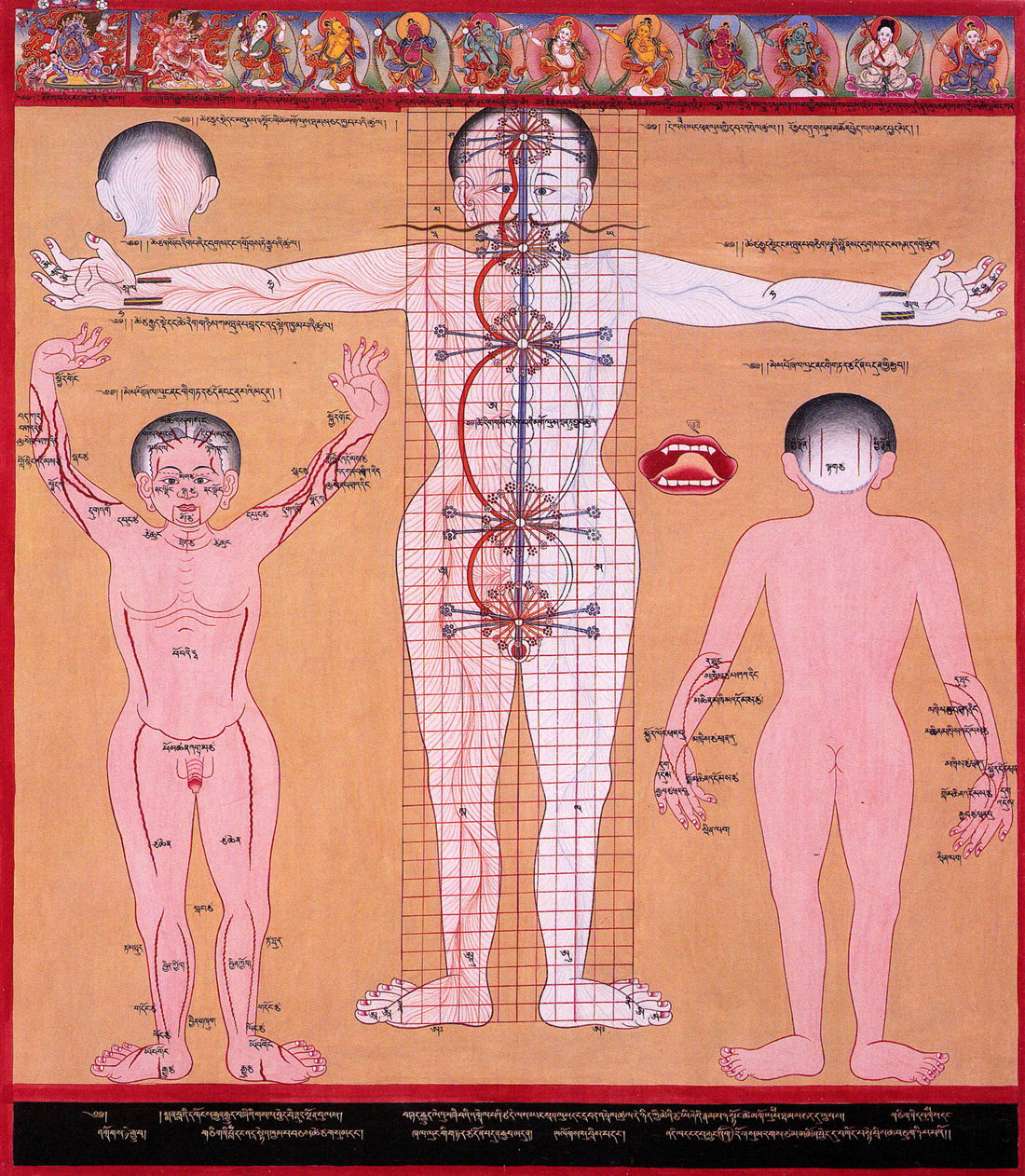
A Tibetan illustration of the subtle body showing the central channel and two side channels as well as the five chakras

Trul khor ('magical instrument' or 'magic circle;' Skt. adhisāra), in full tsa lung trul khor (Sanskrit: vayv-adhisāra 'magical movement instrument, channels and inner breath currents'), also known as yantra yoga, is a Vajrayana discipline which includes pranayama (breath control) and body postures (asanas). From the perspective of the Indo-Tibetan Buddhist traditions of Dzogchen, the mind is merely vāyu (breath or, more literally, wind) in the body. Thus working with vāyu and the body is paramount, while meditation, on the other hand, is considered contrived and conceptual.

Namkhai Norbu Rinpoche (1938-2018), a proponent of trul khor, preferred to use the equivalent Sanskrit-derived English term 'yantra yoga' when writing in English. Yantra Yoga was first brought to Tibet by Padmasambhava. He is said to have received the instructions of the mahasiddha Humkara, a guru he had encountered in Nepal.

Trul khor traditionally consists of 108 movements, including bodily movements (synergy of breathing and movement), incantations (or mantras), pranayama and visualizations. However different lineages have variations in the number of movements. Specific Bön Dzogchen cycles like the Zhang Zhung Nyen Gyud outline distinct set of 39 movements while other focussed on practices of 5 elementary movements.

The walls of the Dalai Lama's summer temple of Lukhang depict trul khor asanas.

== Lung ==
Lung (Tibetan: རླུང rlung) means wind or breath. It is a key concept in the Vajrayana traditions of Tibetan Buddhism and has a variety of meanings. Lung is a concept that is particularly important to understandings of the illusory body and the trikaya (body, speech and mind). The 'illusory body', which is often referred to as the 'vajra body' in medieval Tibetan Buddhist discourse, is constituted by the flow of subtle energy currents:

- 'rlung' (Wylie) is equivalent to Sanskrit: prāna or vāyu.
- 'rtsa' (Wylie) is equivalent to Sanskrit: nāḍī, sirā, srota and dhamanī;

== Channels ==
The channels are the energy pathways along which the prana flows. There are three main channels or nadis: ida, pingala, and sushumna. Nadis is a Sanskrit term for physical and subtle channels. The literal meaning of nadi is “a river” or “a channel” through which something flows. According to all major systems of traditional Asian medicine—Indian, Chinese, and Tibetan—the prana, chi, lung, or life force flows through a network of subtle channels traversing the body. The Tibetan term tsa carries meanings including channel, passageway, root, and cause and refers to both physical channels like nerves, veins, and arteries and subtle and immaterial nadis or energy channels.

== Yantra yoga ==
Namkhai Norbu was the first to discuss trul khor in his book on yantra yoga, essentially a commentary on a practical yoga manual by Vairotsana. Namkhai Norbu began dissemination of Yantra Yoga through his practical teaching and esoteric transmission of this discipline within the International Dzogchen Community, which he founded some time after 1975 in Italy, Merigar.

Chaoul (2006) has begun discussion of Bon traditions of Trul Khor in English with his thesis from Rice University. In his work, Chaoul makes reference to a commentary by the famed Bonpo Dzogchen master, Shardza Tashi Gyaltsen.

Tenzin Wangyal Rinpoche's text Awakening the Sacred Body presents some of the basic practices of trul khor according to the Tibetan Bön tradition.

== Primary texts ==
- Tibetan: འཕྲུལ་འཁོར་ཉི་ཟླ་ཁ་སྦྱོར་གྱི་དགོངས་འགྲེལ་དྲི་མེད་ནོར་བུའི་མེ་ལོང, Wylie: 'phrul 'khor nyi zla kha sbyor gyi dgongs 'grel dri med nor bu'i me long
- Shardza Tashi Gyaltsen: byang zab nam mkha' mdzod chen las snyan rgyud rtsa rlung 'phrul 'khor

== See also ==
- Desi Sangye Gyatso
- Six yogas of Naropa
- Vairotsana
- Padmasambhava
- Vinyasa
