= Seventeen tantras =

Collection of Dzogchen tantras

The Seventeen Tantras of the Esoteric Instruction Series (Tibetan: མན་ངག་སྡེའི་རྒྱུད་བཅུ་བདུན, Wylie: man ngag sde'i rgyud bcu bdun) or the Seventeen Tantras of the Ancients (rnying-ma'i rgyud bcu-bdun) are an important collection of tantras in the Nyingma school of Tibetan Buddhism. They comprise the core scriptures of the "esoteric instruction series" (Menngagde) of Dzogchen teachings and are its most authoritative scriptures.

The Seventeen Tantras are part of the Vima Nyingthig ("Inner Essence of Vimalamitra"), a terma cycle of Dzogchen texts revealed by the treasure discoverer Zhangton Tashi Dorje (c. 1097-1127) and associated with the 8th century Indian monk Vimalamitra who is traditionally believed by the Nyingma school to have first brought these texts to Tibet.

The Vima Nyingthig itself consists of 'tantras' (rgyud), 'agamas' (lung), and 'upadeshas' (man ngag). The other texts are mainly exegetical literature on the material found in the Seventeen tantras. The Seventeen Tantras explain the view (lta ba) of Dzogchen, the two main forms of Dzogchen meditation (sgom pa) - kadag trekchö ("the cutting through of primordial purity"), and lhündrub tögal ("the direct crossing of spontaneous presence") - and the conduct (spyod pa) of a Dzogchen practitioner, along with other ancillary topics.

== History ==
Contemporary Tibetologists like David Germano and Christopher Hatchell hold that the Vima Nyingthig was likely composed by its discoverer, the terton Zhangton Tashi Dorje (1097-1127). Germano also holds that the first historically attested figure connected with these tantras is Chetsün Sengé Wangchuk (lce btsun seng ge dbang phyug, c. 11th century).

Samten Karmay writes that while Vimalamitra is attested in the sources as a Buddhist monk, there is "a fair amount of uncertainty" about this figure (and likewise about his supposed student, Nyangban Tingzin Zangpo). Vimalamitra's name does appear in some Tibetan inscriptions however. Karmay also notes that certain critics of Dzogchen claimed that it was Chetsün Sengé Wangchuk who authored the Seventeen Tantras.

According to Bryan J. Cuevas, while the traditional Nyingma view is that the Seventeen Tantras were divine revelations received by Garab Dorje, these texts seem to have been "compiled over a long period of time by multiple hands." Cuevas also writes that "the precise identity of these unknown redactors is a riddle that I hope may soon be solved. Whatever the case, we must accept that the collection in the form it is known to us today consists of several layers of history reflecting diverse influences."

Germano also notes that from the time of Chetsün Sengé Wangchuk onwards, "we have datable [historical] figures" in what constitutes a lineage of the Seventeen Tantras. This lineage is as follows: Chetsün Sengé Wangchuk's disciple Zhangton Tashi Dorje (1097-1167), Zhangton's son Nyima Bum (1158-1213), Nyima Bum's nephew Guru jo 'ber (1172-1231), Jo 'ber's disciple Trulzhik Sengge Gyabpa (khrul zhig seng ge rgyab pa, 1200s), Trulzhik's disciple Melong Dorje (1243-1303), and Melong's disciple Kumaradza (1266-1343), who was the root guru of Longchenpa (1308-1363).

=== Traditional Nyingma history ===
In the Nyingma school, the Seventeen Tantras are traditionally said to be translations of Indian texts by figures of the Early Dissemination period, mainly the 8th-century Indian monk Vimalamitra, through his teacher Shri Singha. They are traced back to the quasi-historical figure of Garab Dorje, who is said to have received them from the Buddha Kuntu Zangpo. According to Germano the traditional account of the history of the Seventeen tantras can be found in the sNying thig lo rgyus chen po (The Great Chronicles of the Seminal Heart), a history found in the Vima Nyingtik, which was "possibly authored" by Zhangton Tashi Dorje.

Erik Pema Kunsang outlines the basic traditional lineage as follows:

The first human vidyadhara in the Dzogchen lineage was Garab Dorje, who compiled the 6,400,000 tantras of the Great Perfection. He entrusted these teachings to his main disciple, Manjushrimitra, who then classified them into the Three Sections of Dzogchen: Mind Section, Space Section, and Instruction Section. The chief disciple of Manjushrimitra, the great master known as Shri Singha, divided the Instruction Section into The Four Cycles of Nyingthig: the Outer, Inner, Secret, and Innermost Unexcelled Cycles.

According to Kunsang, traditional Nyingma accounts hold that Shri Singha brought these teachings from Bodhgaya to place Kunsang identifies as China. Shri Singha is also believed to have transmitted the Eighteen Dzogchen Tantras (see below) to Padmasambhava. Shri Singha is said to have hidden these texts.

The Indian scholar Vimalamitra (fl. 8th century), a student of Sri Singha, is closely associated with the Seventeen Tantras in the Nyingma histories, and it is traditionally held that his student Nyangban Tingzin Zangpo transmitted and concealed these scriptures at Zha Lhakhang (zhwa'i lha khang, "Temple of the Hat") after Vimalamitra left Tibet. The Seventeen Tantras are then said to have been discovered by Dangma Lhungyel (11th century), a caretaker monk of Zha Lhakhang, who then proceeded to transmit these teachings to Chetsün Sengé Wangchuk.

== Texts ==
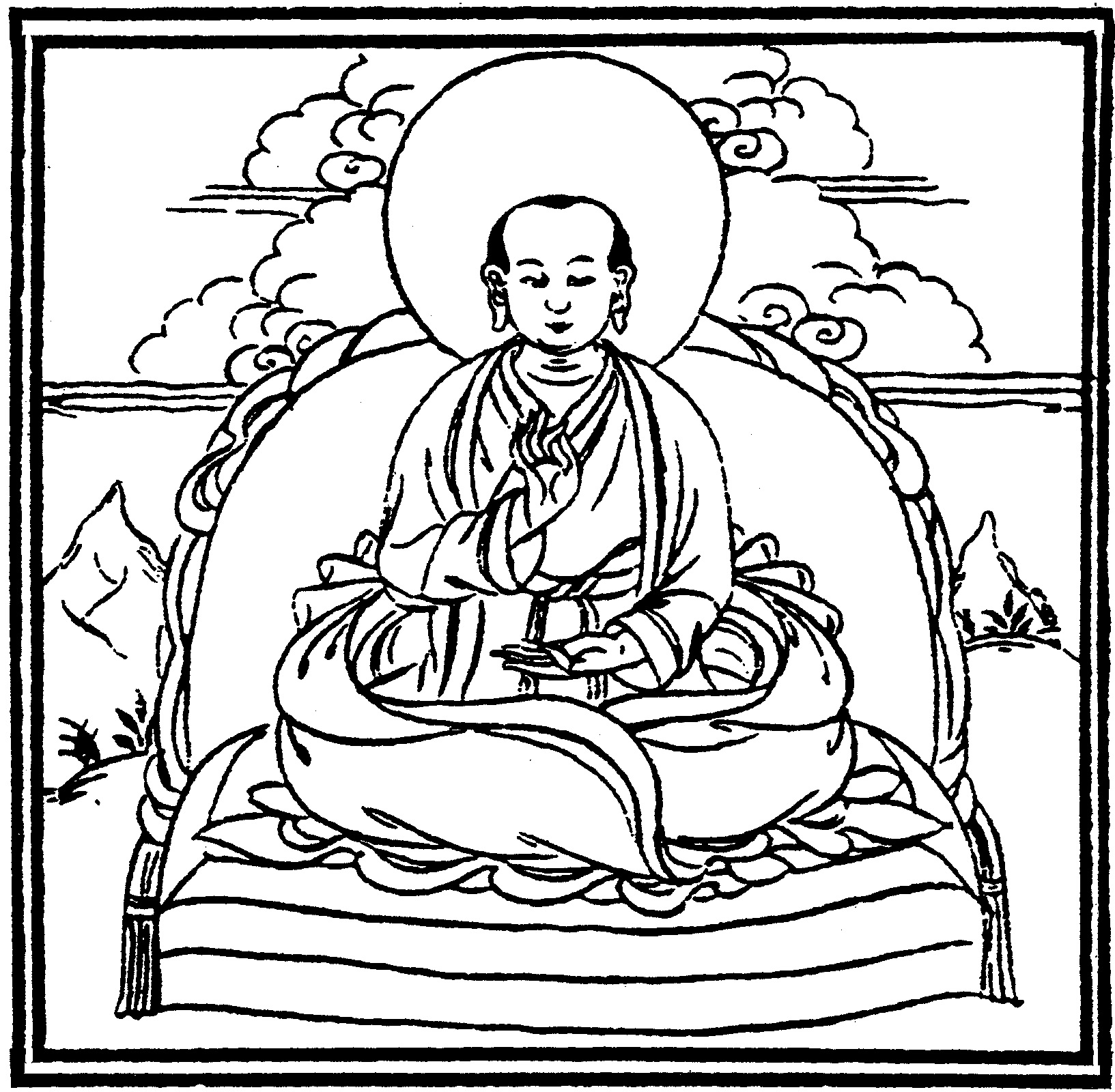
Zhangton Tashi Dorje (1097-1127), the terton who revealed the Vima Nyingtik

According to Hatchell, the Seventeen Tantras "are stylistically quite similar" and all depict themselves as being taught by Buddhas in a question and answer dialogue with their retinue in various settings, such as space, volcanoes and charnel grounds. The dialogues discuss all the main Nyingthig Dzogchen topics, including the basis, cosmogony, the subtle body, buddha-nature, meditative techniques, mandalas, post-death states or bardos, as well as funerary and subjugation rituals.

Kunsang provides the following list of the seventeen tantras:

1. The Reverberation of Sound Tantra (Tibetan: སྒྲ་ཐལ་འགྱུར་, Wylie: sgra thal 'gyur, Skt: ratnākara śabda mahā prasaṅga tantra). This is the root tantra of the Seventeen tantras and states that all spiritual teachings are manifestations of the original primordial sound. The tantra describes a number of esoteric Dzogchen practices, such as semdzin ("holding the mind").
2. The Tantra of Graceful Auspiciousness (Tibetan: བཀྲ་ཤིས་མཛེས་ལྡན་གྱི་རྒྱུད་, Wylie: bkra shis mdzes ldan gyi rgyud, Skt: mahā svaccha suvarṇāpramāṇa śrī tantra).
3. The Mind Mirror of Samantabhadra Tantra (Tibetan: ཀུན་ཏུ་བཟང་པོ་ཐུགས་ཀྱི་མེ་ལོང་, Wylie: kun tu bzang po thugs kyi me long, Skt: samantabhadra cittādarśa tantra).
4. The Blazing Lamp Tantra (Tibetan: སྒྲོན་མ་འབར་བའི་རྒྱུད་, Wylie: sgron ma 'bar ba'i rgyud, Skt: svarṇṇa puṣpa kānti ratnāloka jvala tantra).
5. The Mind Mirror of Vajrasattva Tantra (Tibetan: རྡོ་རྗེ་སེམས་དཔའ་སྙིང་གི་མེ་ལོང་, Wylie: rdo rje sems dpa' snying gi me long, Skt: vajrasatva cittādarśa tantra).
6. The Self-Arising Rigpa Tantra (Tibetan: རིག་པ་རང་ཤར་གྱི་རྒྱུད་, Wylie: rig pa rang shar gyi rgyud, Skt: sarva tathāgata samādhi paribhāṣā jñāna samudāya sūtra mahāyāna guhyānuttara tantra sarva dharmākara sarva buddhānyaśayam mantraikajñāna mahāsandhyarthaprakaṭatantra vidyāsvodayamahātantranāma).
7. The Tantra of Studded Jewels (Tibetan: ནོར་བུ་ཕྲ་བཀོད་, Wylie: nor bu phra bkod, Skt: sarva bhrānti pr̥ kara ratna dhūrta mata tantra nāma)
8. Direct Introduction Tantra (Tibetan: ངོ་སྤྲོད་སྤྲས་པའི་རྒྱུད་, Wylie: ngo sprod spras pa'i rgyud, Skt: darśanopadeśa ratnācita kṣetra dhātu śāsana tantra).
9. The Six Spaces of Samantabhadra Tantra (Tibetan: ཀུན་ཏུ་བཟང་པོ་ཀློང་དྲུག་, Wylie: kun tu bzang po klong drug, Skt: samantabhadrāvartta ṣaṣṭha tantra).
10. The Tantra Without Syllables (Tibetan: ཡི་གེ་མེད་པའི་རྒྱུད་, Wylie: yi ge med pa'i rgyud, Skt: anakṣara mahā tantra nāma ratna dhvaja rāja saṃtati dr̥ṣṭi gagana sama mahā tantra).
11. The Lion's Perfect Expressive Power Tantra (Tibetan: སེང་གེ་རྩལ་རྫོགས་ཀྱི་རྒུད་, Wylie: seng ge rtsal rdzogs, Skt: mahā siṃha parākrama pūrṇṇa tantra).
12. The Necklace of Precious Pearls Tantra (Tibetan: མུ་ཏིག་རིན་པོ་ཆེའི་ཕྲེང་བའི་རྒྱུད་, Wylie: mu tig rin po che'i phreng ba'i rgyud, Skt: ratna muṣṭi mūlā tantra).
13. The Self-liberated Rigpa Tantra (Tibetan: རིག་པ་རང་གྲོལ་གྱི་རྒྱུད་, Wylie: rig pa rang grol gyi rgyud, Skt: mahā vidyā svamukti sarva ghaṭṭita tantra).
14. The Mound of Jewels Tantra (Tibetan: རིན་པོ་ཆེ་སྤུང་བའི་རྒྱུད་, Wylie: rin po che spung ba'i rgyud, Skt: ratna kūṭa mahā guṇoddeśa tantra rāja).
15. The Shining Relics Tantra (Tibetan: སྐུ་གདུང་འབར་བའི་རྒྱུད་, Wylie: sku gdung 'bar ba'i rgyud, Skt: śrī gagana śarīra jvala mahā tantra).
16. The Union of the Sun and Moon Tantra (Tibetan: ཉི་ཟླ་ཁ་སྦྱོར་གྱི་རྒྱུད་, Wylie: nyi zla kha sbyor gyi rgyud, Skt: mahā sūrya candra ghana guhya tantra).
17. The Self-existing Perfection Tantra (Tibetan: རྫོགས་པ་རང་བྱུང་གི་རྒྱུད་, Wylie: rdzogs pa rang byung gi rgyud, Skt: kāyālokoddiṣṭābhisiñca mahā svayambhū tantra).

=== Other tantras ===
The Seventeen Tantras are often grouped together with other tantras as a set.

They are designated as "The Eighteen Tantras" when the Troma Tantra, otherwise known as The Tantra of the Black Wrathful Shri Ekajati (dpal e ka dza ti nag mo khros ma'i rgyud) which deals with the protective rites of Ekajati, is appended to the seventeen.

The "Nineteen Tantras" are the eighteen above along with the Tantra of the Lucid Expanse. Samantabhadrī is associated with the Longsel Barwey and its full name is Tantra of Brahmā's Sun of the Luminous Expanse of Samantabhadrī (Wylie: kun tu bzang mo klong gsal 'bar ma nyi ma'i rgyud).

According to Germano, another tantra which is closely associated with the Seventeen Tantras is the Thig le kun gsal (Total Illumination of the Bindu).

=== Sources, versions and variations ===
These Seventeen Tantras are to be found in the Canon of the Ancient School, the Nyingma Gyubum (Tibetan: རྙིང་མ་རྒྱུད་འབུམ, Wylie: rnying ma rgyud 'bum), volumes 9 and 10, folio numbers 143-159 of the edition edited by Jamyang Khyentse Rinpoche commonly known as Dilgo Khyentse Rinpoche (Thimpu, Bhutan, 1973), reproduced from the manuscript preserved at Tingkye Gonpa Jang (Tibetan: གཏིང་སྐྱེས་དགོན་པ་བྱང, Wylie: gting skyes dgon pa byang) Monastery in Tibet.

=== Commentaries ===
The most influential commentator on the topics of the Seventeen Tantras is Longchen Rabjampa (1308–1364). His numerous writings, including the Seven Treasuries and Lama Yangtig, comment on the major topics of the Seventeen Tantras and the Vima Nyingthig. According to Germano, Longchenpa integrated the doctrines and practices of the Seventeen Tantras "into the increasingly normative modernist discourses that had taken shape from the contemporary Indian Buddhist logico-epistemological circles, Madhyamaka, Yogacara, and tantric traditions of the late tenth to thirteenth centuries."

== English translations ==
- The Self-Arising Rigpa Tantra and The Self-Liberated Rigpa Tantra are translated by Malcolm Smith in The Self-Arisen Vidya Tantra (vol 1) and The Self-Liberated Vidya Tantra (vol 2): A Translation of the Rigpa Rang Shar (vol 1) and A Translation of the Rigpa Rangdrol (vol 2) (Wisdom Publications, 2018).
- Chapters 39 and 40 of The Self-Arising Rigpa Tantra are translated by H. V. Guenther in Wholeness Lost and Wholeness Regained (SUNY Press, 1994).
- Excerpts from the fourth chapter of The Lion's Perfect Expressive Power are translated by Janet Gyatso in Buddhist Scriptures (Ed. Donald Lopez, published by Penguin Classics, 2004)
- The Blazing Lamp Tantra and The Tantra Without Syllables is translated by Smith in The Tantra Without Syllables (Vol 3) and The Blazing Lamp Tantra (Vol 4): A Translation of the Yigé Mepai Gyu (Vol. 3) A Translation of the Drönma Barwai Gyu and Mutik Trengwa Gyupa (Vol 4) (Wisdom Publications, 2020).
- The Blazing Lamp is translated by Christopher Hatchell in Naked Seeing: The Great Perfection, the Wheel of Time, and Visionary Buddhism in Renaissance Tibet (Oxford University Press, 2014), and translated in A Mound of Jewels.

The Seventeen Tantras are quoted extensively throughout Longchenpa's (1308 - 1364?) 'The Precious Treasury of the Way of Abiding' (Tibetan: གནས་ལུགས་རིན་པོ་ཆེའི་མཛོད, Wylie: gnas lugs rin po che'i mdzod) translated by Richard Barron and Padma Translation Committee (1998). This work is one of Longchenpa's Seven Treasuries. The Tibetan text is available in unicode at Tsadra’s digital Dharma Text Repository. The Seventeen Tantras are also extensively discussed in Longchenpa's Precious Treasury of Philosophical Systems, also translated by Richard Barron, as well as in Vimalamitra's Great Commentary, translated in Buddhahood in This Life, by Smith.
