= Semde =

Tibetan Buddhist concept

Semde (Tibetan: སེམས་སྡེ, Wylie: sems sde; Sanskrit: cittavarga, "mind division", "mind class" or "mind series" is the name of one of three scriptural and lineage divisions within the Dzogchen (Great Perfection) tradition. The Nyingma school of Tibetan Buddhism traditionally classifies its Dzogchen teaching into three main divisions: Semde, Longdé (Space Series) and Menngagde (Secret Instruction Series).

Semde texts are mostly said to be translations by figures of the early transmission (7th–9th centuries) of Buddhism to Tibet like Śrī Siṅgha, Vairotsana and Vimalamitra. These texts emphasize the "awakened mind" (Tibetan: byang-chub-kyi sems, Skt. bodhicitta), which is the true nature of the mind and is essentially pure and perfect, just like Buddhahood. Semde texts critique tantric practice as being based on effort, and instead promote simple and effortless contemplation of the mind and its emptiness, luminosity, purity and inherent gnosis.

== Background and history ==
=== Earliest sources ===
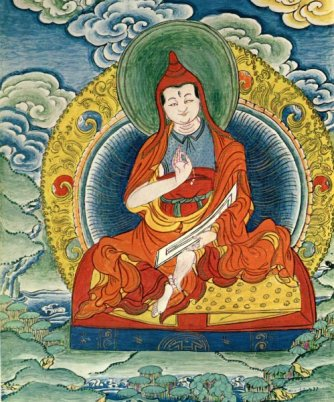
Vairotsana (བཻ་རོ་ཙ་ན་, Sanskrit: Vairocana), an 8th-century Tibetan translator of Semde texts. He traveled and studied in India, Nepal and China, and was ordained by Shantarakshita.

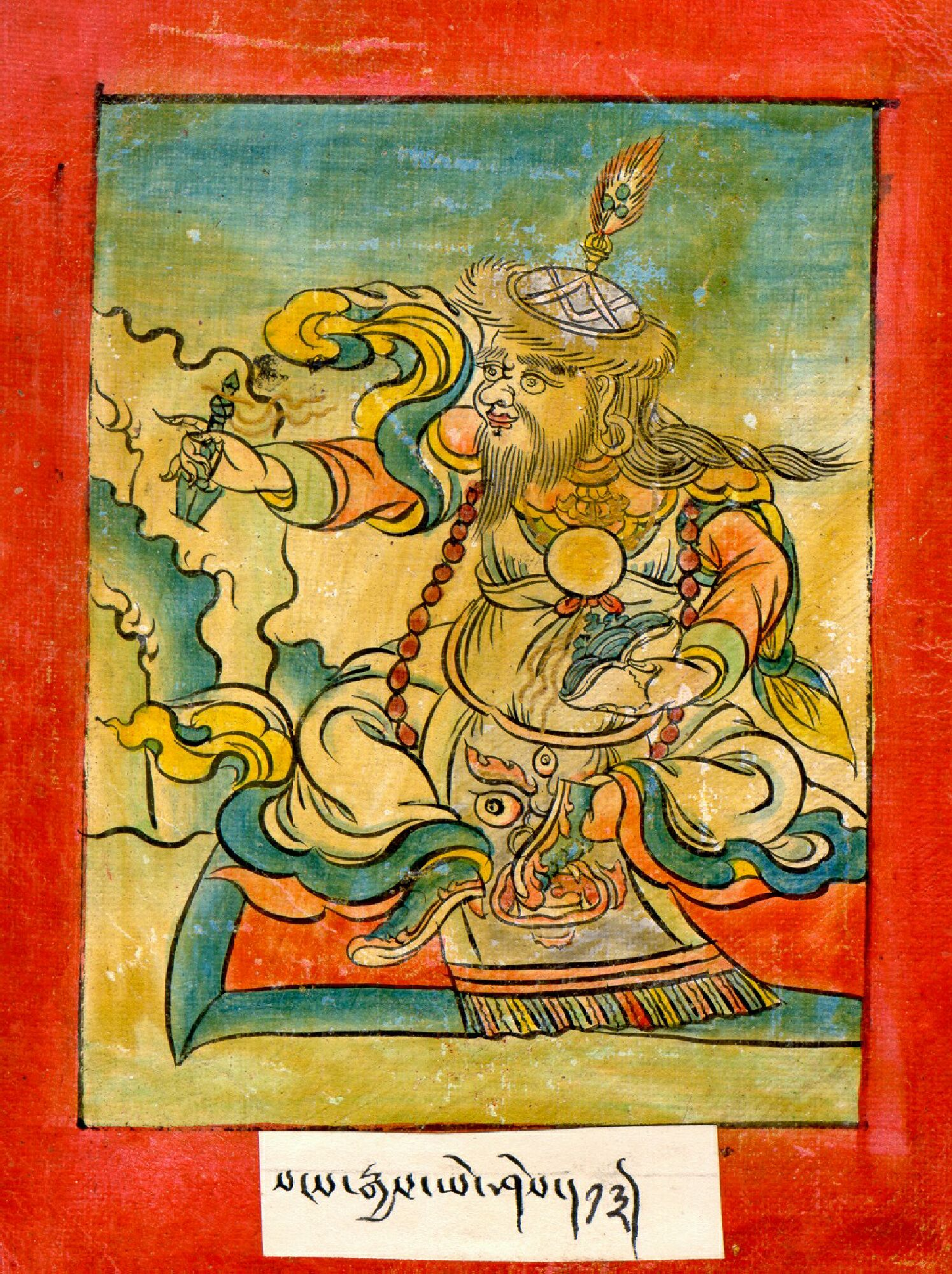
Nubchen Sanggye Yeshe (832–962), an early scholar and systematizer of Dzogchen thought.

The Dzogchen texts which are today classified as "Semde" include the earliest Dzogchen sources currently known. These are generally short texts which appeared in the ninth century and are attributed to early transmission figures like Garab Dorje (seventh century?), Śrīsiṁha (eighth century), Vairotsana (8th century) and Vimalamitra (eighth-ninth century). These teachings were influenced by tantric sources like the Guhyagarbha tantra as well as by Yogacara "mind-only" and buddha-nature literature. Various scholars have shown that early Dzogchen teachings developed out of the teachings of the Mahayoga tantras like the Guhyagarbha.

Scholars like Samten Karmay and Karen Liljenberg have also argued that other traditions like tantric Shaivism and Chan Buddhism may have had some influence on this early Dzogchen literature. Jean-luc Achard has noted some similarities between Dzogchen practices and the teachings of the Shaiva Vijñānabhairava tantra. Regarding Chan, Liljenberg notes that various documents form Dunhuang indicate that some Dzogchen practitioners were syncretizing Dzogchen with Chan and other early Dzogchen works show that other people disagreed with this trend. This is also supported by the work of the Tibetan scholar Nubchen Sanggye Yeshe. Nubchen attempts to argue for the difference between the two teachings and the superiority of Dzogchen, but he also agrees that much of their terminology is similar. Furthermore, the biography of several Dzogchen masters depict them as traveling to China (Vairotsana) or even having transmitted Chan lineages (Aro Yeshe).

Liljenberg writes that the main themes of the five early translations include non-duality (gnyis med), universal equality (mnyam nyid), "non-action" (bya med), "not seeking (rtsol med) the enlightened state", and the fact that there is "no need for meditation or gradual practices to purify or improve oneself" since "there is no path to follow, as the "destination" of enlightenment is already reached, and primordially-immanent." According to the Tibetologist David Germano, early Dzogchen "Semde" texts ignore or deny the validity and relevance of Vajrayana tantric practices and rituals in favor of terse poetic descriptions and direct experience of the awakened mind (bodhicitta). As such, he calls these works "pristine Great Perfection", and contrasts them with the later texts of the "Funerary Great Perfection" which embrace the taboo tantric imagery of violence, sex and death. Germano writes that these early sources "are marked by the absence of presentations of detailed ritual and contemplative technique," and by the lack of the "funerary Buddhism" of the anuttarayogatantras (including any discussion of charnel ground imagery, death motifs, bodily relics, funerary rituals, and bardo teachings) as well as tantric sexual motifs and practices.

Some Semde texts, like the Kunjed Gyalpo, even deny the validity and relevance of key elements of tantric buddhism (such as mandalas, empowerment, stages of practice, etc.). As Liljenberg notes, the Total Space of Vajrasattva (rdo rje sems dpa’ nam mkha' che) calls tantric practice "a childish pursuit" (byis pa'i spyod yul). Sam van Schaik also writes that "later developments in the Great Perfection brought far more complex doctrines and practices, but the early mind series texts stayed close to one central theme: the immediate presence of the enlightened mind, and the consequent use- lessness of any practice that is aimed at creating, cultivating or uncovering the enlightened state." However, not all early Dzogchen sources reject tantric ritual, some of them, like Padmasambhava's Garland of Views, present Dzogchen within the framework of tantric Mahayoga. As such, it is likely there was a spectrum of early Dzogchen methodologies, some more tantric than others.

While the terms "Mind Section" (Tib. sems sde) and "Mind Orientation" (Tib. sems phyogs) are not attested prior to the 11th century (and are thus not found in the earliest Dzogchen texts), they are used by Tibetan and Western scholars retroactively to refer to a class of texts. The most important of these are the "Eighteen Great Scriptures" (Lung-chen bco-brgyad), which came to be called "mind series" (sems de) texts at a later date. Five of these texts, the "five early translations" (snga ’gyur nga), are perhaps the earliest of these, and are attributed to the monk Vairotsana of Pagor. Manuscripts of some of these texts have been found in the Dunhuang caves. They include The Cuckoo of Awareness (Rig pa'i khu byug), The Small Hidden Grain (gSangs rgyas sbas pa), Questions and Answers of Vajrasattva and Gold Refined from Ore (rdo la gser zhun). According to Liljenberg, Gold Refined from Ore may be the earliest of these and could indeed have been written in India.

Sam van Schaik notes that some of the earliest datable Dzogchen texts are The Meditation on the Awakened Mind by Mañjuśrīmitra (which is listed in a 9th century catalogue called the Denkarma) and various short texts which are quoted by Nubchen Sangye Yeshe's late 9th century Lamp for the Eyes of Contemplation (Samten Migdrön). Nubchen's Lamp itself is a very important commentarial source for early "Semde" Dzogchen, as it quotes numerous early sources, and is also one of the earliest texts which claim that Dzogchen is a distinct vehicle of spiritual practice (yana). The Lamp also lists the “twenty or eighteen minor texts on the mind” (which refers to the eighteen great scriptures), indicating that even as early as the 9th century, these works were beginning to be considered as a group.

Another important source for early Dzogchen Semde ideas is the work of gNyan dPal dbyangs (c. 8-9th century), especially his rDo rje sems dpa’ zhus lan (Vajrasattva Questions and Answers) manuscripts of which have been found in Dunhuang and his sGron ma drug (Six Lamps), which are widely quoted by Nubchen.

=== Later developments ===
The Kun byed rgyal po (All Creating King), which is historically the most important Semde text in Nyingma, is a slightly later composite text possibly dating from the late 10th or the early 11th century which contains within it various short early Semde texts like the Cuckoo of Rigpa.

By the 11th century these traditions developed in different systems such as the Kham, the Rong and the Nyang systems, which according to Ronald Davidson "are represented by texts surviving from the thirteenth to sixteenth centuries"). The Kham system was founded by the Kham yogi Aro Yeshe Jungne (a ro ye shes 'byun gnas, 10th century). This lineage unified the teachings of Dzogchen and the Chan lineage of Heshang Moheyan what was called "the Mental Position system" (A-ro lugs). The Rong lineage is associated with Rongzom.

During the 13th century, Semde lineages and traditions became less popular and were slowly outcompeted by the much more popular Intimate Instruction (Mennagde) systems of Dzogchen, especially the Seminal Heart (Nying-thig) tradition. These new Dzogchen teachings had begun to appear in the Renaissance period (11th–12th century) and are associated with treasure revealers like Chetsün Sengé Wangchuk and Zhangton Tashi Dorje (1097–1127) who claimed they had discovered texts that had been hidden by figures like Vimalamitra.

In the new Mennagde systems, early Dzogchen teachings were first given the classification of "Semde" and were subordinated to the teachings of the Seminal Heart tradition. According to Instruction Series texts, the Mind Series is based on understanding that one's own mind is the basis of all appearances and that this basis, called mind itself, is empty and luminous.

According to the modern Dzogchen teacher Namkhai Norbu, the three series are three modes of presenting and introducing the state of Dzogchen. Norbu states that Mennagde is a more direct form of introduction, Longde is closely associated with symbolic forms of introducing Dzogchen, and Semde is more focused on oral forms of introduction.

== Teachings ==
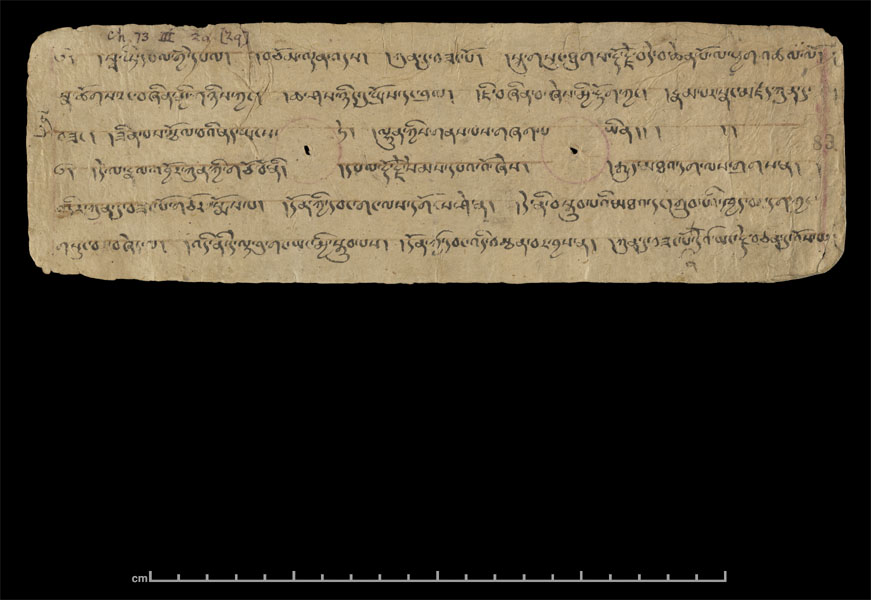
Part of the early Dzogchen 'semde' text The cuckoo of awareness, found at Dunhuang.

=== View ===
The focus of all these texts is the "awakened mind" (byang-chub-kyi sems, Skt. bodhicitta). According to Sten Anspal, this common Buddhist term has a special meaning in Dzogchen texts. It refers to the true nature of consciousness, "which is essentially identical to the state of Buddha". Anspal writes that according to Semde texts, accessing and abiding in this pure and perfect awakened mind "fulfills and surpasses all the various practices and methods of other Buddhist approaches."

Christopher Hatchell explains that for these early Dzogchen texts "all beings and all appearances are themselves the singular enlightened gnosis of the buddha All Good (Samantabhadra, Kuntu Zangpo)". The Victorious Emergence of the Peak (rTse mo byung rgyal) says that "the diversity [that is] Samantabhadra" is “the principal consciousness, the Basis-of-all” (kun gzhi) which "has never stirred from the expanse of naturally-occurring primordial wisdom" and is "endowed with compassionate energy that completely pervades a thousand realms". This expansive awareness which is often compared to the vasteness of the sky is called the “Great Self” (bdag nyid chen po) in various Semde texts, including the All-Encompassing Perfection (sPyi chings). This idea of an innate awakened mind is influenced by the Mahayana Buddhist buddha-nature literature which states that all sentient beings have a pure buddha-matrix or essence (tathāgatagarbha).

Mañjuśrīmitra's Meditation on the Awakened Mind describes bodhicitta as the “self-nature of experience” (Tib. sems kyi rang bzhin, Skt. citta-svabhava), and as the “ultimate nature of experience" (Tib. sems kyi chos nyid, Skt. citta-dharmata). Namkhai Norbu writes that in Semde sources, terms like bodhicitta, the very core of bodhicitta (snying po byang chub kyi sems), and “the primordial ground of being” (ye gzhi), are all synonyms for the Great Perfection (Dzogchen), which is "the primordial state of pure and total presence" that is also called “the great hypersphere” (thig le chen po), “the all-inclusive state of the individual” (bdag nyid chen po), and “spontaneous perfection” (hun grub).

One of the terms that Nubchen Sangye Yeshe draws on to explain the nature of the ground, the intrinsic state, is "spontaneous presence" (Tib. lhun grub). According to Esler, Nubchen sees this as the state in which "all the various wisdoms are spontaneously complete". Nuben calls this state "the great excellence in self and others" and compares to a wish granting jewel. Nubchen is also careful to explain that this spontenous wisdom is free of any thoughts, words, or concepts, as well as any sense of existence or non-existence, comparing it to sky-like spaciousness. As Nubchen writes:

Intrinsic awareness, aware of space, is free from thoughts:
Endowed with the force of abiding naturally,
It is without thoughts and occurs like the sky itself.

According to Keith Dowman, the five translations of Vairotsana focus on simple non-dualism and include no anthropomorphic symbolism and no "abstruse metaphysical infrastructure". Instead, the focus is on the nondual reality of the timeless "unitary light of awareness" which is a naturally perfect "all-inclusive wholeness". This enlightened mind is the ineffable ground of all things. Dowman further describes it as an "ineffable nondual reality that is a unity but at the same time a multiplicity. It is at once the source and the creation. It is inconceivable and inexpressible. It is enlightened mind or luminous mind."

=== Practice ===
According to Germano, Semde texts claim that striving for liberation through structured practices (like tantric visualization and ritual) creates more delusion. Instead, Semde works recommend simple contemplations to recognize the pure and empty awakened mind. Christopher Hatchell writes that Semde works show "a disinterest in specifying any kind of structured practices or concepts" which are used to connect with the ultimate gnosis (rigpa). Instead, Semde texts argue that "there is nothing to do and nothing to strive for, so the reality of All Good will manifest in its immediacy just by relaxing and letting go." According to van Schaik, in these early Dzogchen texts, rigpa (gnosis, knowledge) refers to a non-dual and non-conceptual awareness.

Germano writes that the main contemplation in Semde works was a formless "technique free immersion in the bare immediacy of one's own deepest levels of awareness". This formless method was seen as superior to the visual fabrications of tantric deity yoga. However, the teachers of this formless method may have also used "calming" (samatha) practices as well as some tantric practices as preparatory or secondary methods.

Dowman similarly writes that the ethos of these early Dzogchen texts is "non-action," "undirected action" or "non-deliberate action". This is because "the here and now is a field of immanent sameness, and any attempt to affect it or change it by any technique is counterproductive. Any engagement of effort diminishes it. Seeking it inhibits its discovery." As such, these texts teach the "no meditation" of letting go of all goal directed activity, since the luminous mind cannot be accessed through calculated discipline and structured activity. They also contain no teaching on graduated progress or path, since the nature of mind is already complete and perfect. It cannot be improved from its immanent perfect state and so there is no place to go or path to follow.

The Semde attitude of “nonaction” (bya ba med pa) to religious practice can be found in the following short Semde text called "The Cuckoo of Rigpa" (rig pa'i khu byug):

In variety, there is no difference.
And in parts, a freedom from elaborations.
Things as things are, are not conceptual, but
The shining forth of appearances is All Good.
Since you are finished, cast off the sickness of effort!
Resting naturally, leave things [as they are].

Esler notes that this important text attempts to reconcile the diversity of appearances with the deeper non-dual nature of all things, which is equated with Buddha Samantabhadra (All Good). Since all appearances are ultimately good, there is nothing to do but rest in the spontaneity of what is present. According to Esler, this "non-referential" (Tib. dmigs med) form of meditation lacks any specific object of focus and instead entails repeatedly training "the ability to rest, “effortlessly,” in a state of awareness (Tib. rig pa) identified as being already perfect in every way." This is confirmed by Nubchen Sangye Yeshe who writes in his commentaries that Dzogchen transcends the use any meditation supports like mudrās, objects of mental focus and mantra repetition. This is supported by a commentary to the Cuckoo of Rigpa found at Dunhuang (ITJ 647) which states: "because of the spontaneous accomplishment of ineffable bodhicitta, the mandala is established spontaneously and abides without artifice, with no need for the activities of development and perfection."

In a similar fashion, the Semde text called the bDe ba phra bkod says:

There is no practice to be accomplished, [and] no fixation upon any deities. There is no meditation to be done; [it is] free of any object of attention.

The Realization of the True Meaning of Meditation (sGom pa don sgrub) also says that since the true nature of the mind is Dharmata (the ultimate nature of things), there is no need to meditate on anything else:

Whatever characteristics of conceptual thought may arise, if one knows that very thought to be the true nature of things, there is no need to meditate on the realm of reality anywhere else.

Norbu notes that the practice of "nondoing" in Dzogchen Semde must be grounded in a deep understanding of the nature of the mind, the mind's natural condition (i.e. rigpa). It is only in this state that there is "nothing to correct or adjust, accept or reject; there is no meditation to enter into or come out of."

=== Four yogas ===
One feature of the practice of contemplation in semde as taught today is "four yogas" (where yoga in Tibetan: རྣལ་འབྱོར་, Wylie: rnal ’byor, THL: näljor). The four yogas are:

- Calm state (Wylie: gnas pa) this is taught as a kind of śamatha cultivation with eyes open. One method which is taught is gazing at an object, like an image of the letter A, which is the main symbol for primordial consciousness in Dzogchen according to Namkhai Norbu. Another method is practicing calm meditation without any object.
- Non-movement (Wylie: mi g.yo ba), which is associated with vipaśyāna
- Non-duality (Wylie: mnyam nyid, Sanskrit: advaya), and
- "Spontaneous presence" or "the self-perfected state" (Sanskrit: anābhoga or nirābhoga, Tibetan: ལྷུན་གྲུབ་, Wylie: lhun grub, THL: lhündrub).

According to Namkhai Norbu, "there is no difference between the state of lhundrub and the Tregchöd spoken of in the Dzogchen Upadesha".

These four yogas are said to parallel the Four Yogas of Mahamudra.

== Texts ==
The mind class (semde) of Dzogchen are today found in the Collected Tantras of the Ancients (Nyingma Gyubum) and in other Nyingma school collections like Collected Tantras of Vairocana.

=== Main texts ===
The most important Semde texts are part of a collection that goes under various names including "the twenty or eighteen minor [texts of the] Mind" (an appellation found in Nubchen Sanggye Yeshe's Lamp for the Eyes of Contemplation), and "the Eighteen Major Crucial Teachings" (lung chen po bco brgyad). Modern scholars generally agree that the eighteen Semde texts is the earliest corpus of Dzogchen literature. However, there is much confusion and diversity regarding the contents of this collection (including the number of texts in it, hence Nubchen's statement that they consist of "the twenty or eighteen" works).

Between the 9th and 14th centuries, various lists of these main Semde texts proliferated, and these different lists vary in content. Further complicating the issue is the fact that Semde texts with the same title found in different sources can sometimes be different texts altogether. Furthermore, Karen Liljenberg has also noted that some of Semde texts in this collection may have changed names. As such, this corpus of works may have served as an "ideal" canon, rather than a specific closed list of texts.

Whatever the case, Longchenpa's list of twenty one main Semde texts in the Treasury of Spiritual and Philosophical Systems (Grub mtha’ mdzod) is the following:

The Five Early Translations (sNga ‘gyur lnga) of Vairotsana, also known as the five bodhicitta texts, which are:

1. The Bodhicitta Cuckoo of Rigpa (Wylie: Byang chub sems rig pa khu byug)
2. The Great Potency of Bodhicitta (Wylie: Byang chub sems rtsal chen sprugs pa)
3. The Bodhicitta Great Soaring Garuda (Wylie: Byang chub sems khyung chen lding ba)
4. Mañjuśrīmitra's Meditation on the Awakened Mind (Byang chub sems bsgom pa), also known as Extracting Pure Gold from Ore (Wylie: rdo la gser zhun). It is a logical exposition of Semde teaching which makes much use of Yogacara thought.
5. The Bodhicitta Unwaning Standard of Victory, also known as The Total Space of Vajrasattva (Wylie: Byang chub sems mi nub pa’i rgyal mtshan; rDo rje sems dpa' nam mkha' che), this text also appears as the thirteenth chapter of the Kun byed rgyal po, and in other Tantras.

The thirteen later translations (Phyi ‘gyur bcu gsum), translated by Vimalamitra assisted by Nyak Jñānakumāra and Yudra Nyingpo:

1. The Victorious Emergence of the Peak (Wylie: rtse mo byung rgyal)
2. The King of Space (Wylie: rnam mkha'i rgyal po)
3. Bodhicitta's Jewel-Encrusted Ornament of Bliss (Wylie: Byang chub sems bde ba 'phrul bkod)
4. All-Encompassing Perfection (Wylie: rdzogs pa spyi chings)
5. The Essence of Bodhicitta (Wylie: byang chub sems tig), also known as The Quintessential King (Yang tig rgyal po)
6. Infinite Bliss (Wylie: bde ba rab 'byams)
7. The Wheel of Life (Wylie: srog gi 'khor lo)
8. The Six Spheres (Wylie: thig le drug pa)
9. Bodhicitta's All-Penetrating Perfection (Wylie: Byang chub sems rdzogs pa spyi gcod)
10. The Wish-Fulfilling Precious Jewel (Wylie: yid bzhin nor bu)
11. All-Unifying Rigpa (Wylie: kun tu rig pa)
12. The Supreme Lord (Wylie: rje btsan dam pa)
13. The Realization of the True Meaning of Meditation (Wylie: sgom pa don grub)

Finally, there are three texts which are often classified separately as Semde and listed in other sources (when these are added, the collection is called the 21 Semde texts):

1. The All Creating King Bodhicitta Great Perfection of All Phenomena (Chö Tamched Dzogpa Chenpo Changchub Kyi Sem Kunjed Gyalpo), a composite text which contains within various early Semde works including some of the eighteen Semde texts.
2. The Marvelous Bodhicitta (Wylie: byang chub kyi sems rmad du byung ba). The Marvelous (rMad du byung ba) is the most widely quoted Semde text by Nubchen Sanggye Yeshe in his Lamp for the Eyes of Contemplation.
3. The Ten Concluding Teachings (mDo bcu)

Furthermore, there are other Semde texts which are not part of the common list of Semde texts, but are still considered important. Two other important texts which are quoted by Nubchen in his Lamp are The Small Hidden Grain (rGum chung) and The Universally Definitive Perfection (rDzogs pa spyi spyod). Also, Longchenpa has an alternative list of 18 texts which lists the Tantra of the Edge and the Center of the Sky (Nam mkha' mtha' dbus kyi rgyud).

=== Other texts ===
Aside from the twenty one key Semde works, there are also other works in the Semde section of the Collected Tantras of the Ancients, including other tantras such as exegetical tantras, secondary tantras and secret instruction tantras. Furthermore, the collection called Transmitted Precepts of the Ancients also contains further Semde texts. For example, an anonymous commentary to Extracting Pure Gold from Ore exists, titled the Byang chub sems bsgom pa don bcu gnyis bstan pa.

There is also a collection of Dzogchen songs of realization (dohas) associated with the early translations. These are the Eighteen Songs of Realization (full Tibetan title: Sems sde bco brgyad kyi dgongs pa rig 'dzin rnams kyis rdo rje'i glur bzhengs pa).

Furthermore, as van Schaik notes, there are numerous manuscripts found in Dunhuang which are important for the study of early Dzogchen and Semde, even if some of these do not use the term Dzogchen. One example of these is sBas pa’i rgum chung (ITJ 594) which "looks like an early mind series text, although it is not found in any of the surviving collections."

There are also Dzogchen treatises written by early Nyingma figures. These include the works of Nubchen Sangye Yeshe, especially his Lamp for the Eyes of Contemplation (Samten Migdrön). Nubchen also wrote commentaries on some of the eighteen Semde texts, and these include the rJe btsan dam pa’i ’grel pa [Commentary on the Holy Revered One]; the Byang chub sems bde ba ’phra bkod kyi don ’grel [Meaning Commentary on the Inlaid Jewel of Bliss, the Enlightened Mind]; and the rDo rje gzong phugs kyi ’grel pa [Commentary on the Piercing Awl]. Another Semde commentary is the sPyi gsang sngags lung gi ’grel pa (General Commentary on the Authoritative Scriptures of Secret Mantra), a commentary on the Semde text called the sPyi chings (The Universal Bind) by Nyak Jñānakumāra (fl. 9th c.).

The work of early Nyingma scholars like Rongzom Chökyi Zangpo (1012–1088) and Rogban Sherab (1166–1244) also quote and rely on mostly Semde texts for their explanation of Dzogchen.

Later Nyingma authors also wrote commentaries and treatises on Semde practice, such as Longchenpa's Jewel Ship (rin chen sgru bo), a commentary to The All Creating King.

=== English translations ===
- Clemente, Adriano; Guarisco, Elio; Valby, Jim. The Marvellous Primordial State, The Mejung Tantra, A Fundamental Scripture of Dzogchen Semde, Shang Shung Publications, 2012.
- Clemente, Adriano; Norbu, Namkhai. The Supreme Source: The Fundamental Tantra of Dzogchen Semde Kunjed Gyalpo, Shambhala, 1999.
- Dowman, Keith. Original Perfection: Vairotsana's Five Early Transmissions, 2013.
- Khenchen Palden Sherab Rinpoche, Khenpo Tsewang Dongyal Rinpoche. Pointing Out the Nature of the Mind: Dzogchen Pith Instructions of Aro Yeshe Jungne.
- Kunsang, Erik Pema. Wellsprings of the Great Perfection, Rangjung Yeshe Publications, 2006. [Contains various translations]
- Lipman, Kennard; Norbu, Namkhai. Primordial Experience An Introduction to rDzogs-chen Meditation. Shambala, 1987. [A translation of Gold Refined from Ore and anonymous commentary].
- Lipman, Kennard. You Are the Eyes of the World, Ithaca: Snow Lion, 2000. [A translation of Longchenpa's Jewel Ship]
- Neumaier-Dargyay, E.K. The Sovereign All-Creating Mind: The Motherly Buddha, Albany, 1992.
- Norbu, Namkhai. Rigbai Kujyug: Six Vajra Verses, 1990.
