= The Mirror of the Heart of Vajrasattva =

One of the seventeen tantras of Dzogchen

The Mirror of the Heart of Vajrasattva (Tibetan: རྡོ་རྗེ་སེམས་དཔའ་སྙིང་གི་མེ་ལོང, Wylie: rdo rje sems dpa' snying gi me long) is numbered amongst the Seventeen Tantras of Menngagde (Tibetan: མན་ངག་སྡེའི་རྒྱུད་བཅུ་བདུན, Wylie: man ngag sde'i rgyud bcu bdun) within Dzogchen discourse and is part of the textual support for the Vima Nyingtik.

The Mirror of the Heart of Vajrasattva conveys how the lamps (Tibetan: སྒྲོན་མ, Wylie: sgron ma) are the self-display of awareness. It furthermore lists twenty-one pointing-out instructions appropriate for people with different propensities and proclivities along with four key points and practice instructions.

These Seventeen Tantras are to be found in the Canon of the Ancient School, the Nyingma Gyubum (Tibetan: རྙིང་མ་རྒྱུད་འབུམ, Wylie: rnying ma rgyud 'bum), volumes 9 and 10, folio numbers 143-159 of the edition edited by Jamyang Khyentse Rinpoche commonly known as Dilgo Khyentse Rinpoche (Thimpu, Bhutan, 1973), reproduced from the manuscript preserved at Tingkye Gonpa Jang (Tibetan: གཏིང་སྐྱེས་དགོན་པ་བྱང, Wylie: gting skyes dgon pa byang) Monastery in Tibet.

== Symbolism of the mirror ==
The melong ("mirror") is an important polyvalent symbol and potent teaching tool in Dzogchen.

== English translations ==
This tantra has not as yet has been completely rendered into English nor made generally available.

The Seventeen Tantras are quoted extensively throughout Longchenpa's (1308 - 1364?) The Precious Treasury of the Way of Abiding (Tibetan: གནས་ལུགས་རིན་པོ་ཆེའི་མཛོད, Wylie: gnas lugs rin po che'i mdzod) rendered in English by Barron (1998). This work is one of Longchenpa's Seven Treasuries and the Tibetan text in poor reproduction of the pecha has been made available online by Dowman and Smith.

Richard Barron renders an embedded quotation of this tantra within their translation of Longchenpa's 'Way of Abiding' (Wylie: gnas lugs):

Understand all aspects of awareness to be free of ordinary consciousness, which involves concepts of identity. Similarly, bring this understanding to the point of understanding that all phenomena are unceasing. Bring the understanding of what is unceasing to the point of understanding that it manifests in any way whatsoever. Bring the understanding of what manifests in any way whatsoever to the point of understanding that it is unborn. Bring the understanding what is unborn to the point of understanding that it does not come and go. Bring the understanding of what does not come and go to the point of understanding that it is nondual. Bring the understanding of what is nondual to the point of understanding that it is absolutely free of limitations. Similarly, bring this understanding to the point of not conceptualizing or thinking about any phenomenon in any way. Bring this understanding of all phenomena to the point of experiencing their essence lucidly and without distraction.
