= Zhangton Tashi Dorje =

Tibetan Buddhist Lama

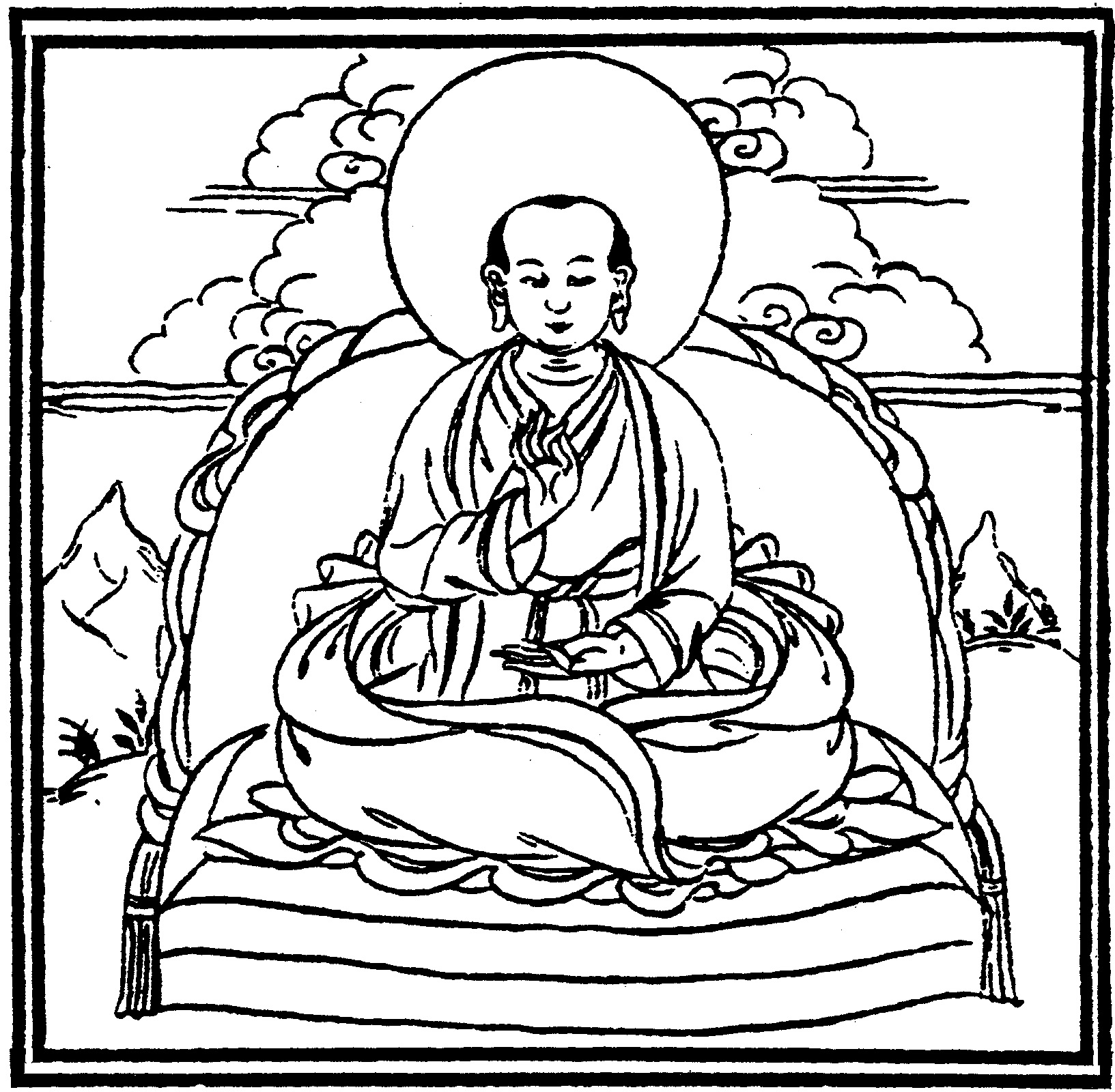
Zhangton Tashi Dorje

Zhangtön Tashi Dorjé (Wylie: zhang ston bkra shis rdo rje, c. 1097 – 1167) was a Tibetan Buddhist Dzogchen teacher who was an important treasure revealer (terton) in the Menngagde lineage of Dzogchen. He is particularly known for revealing the Vima Nyingthig, a key Dzogchen cycle of teachings which includes the Seventeen tantras of Dzogchen. Zhangton was born in Yamdrok Tonang and was a disciple of Chetsün Sengé Wangchuk.

Traditional Nyingma histories hold that Zhangton had visions of Vimalamitra and discovered the Vima Nyingthig as a hidden treasure (terma) in Chimpu, Central Tibet. Zhangton is also known for his authorship of The Great History of the Dzogchen Nyingtik (rdzogs pa chen po snying thig gi lo rgyus chen mo), a detailed chronological account of the Dzogchen tradition and lineage. Zhangton's main successor was his son Nyibum.

Some modern Tibetologists like David Germano and Christopher Hatchell argue that Zhangton may have been the main author of the Vima Nyingthig.

== Sources ==
- Dudjom Rinpoche (1991). The Nyingma School of Tibetan Buddhism, Its Fundamentals and History, trans. and ed. by Gyurme Dorje. Boston: Wisdom Publications, pp. 559–561.
- Nyoshul Khenpo, A Marvelous Garland of Rare Gems: Biographies of Masters of Awareness in the Dzogchen Lineage (Junction City: Padma Publications, 2005), pp. 86–88.
