= Union of the Sun and Moon =

One of the seventeen tantras of the esoteric instruction cycle

The Union of the Sun and Moon (Tibetan: ཉི་ཟླ་ཁ་སྦྱོར, Wylie: nyi zla kha sbyor) is one of the seventeen tantras of the esoteric instruction cycle (Tibetan: མན་ངག་སྡེའི་རྒྱུད་བཅུ་བདུན, Wylie: man ngag sde'i rgyud bcu bdun) which are a suite of tantras known variously as Nyingtik, Upadesha or Menngagde within Dzogchen discourse.

This tantra shows which experience a person undergoes in the intermediate state, the bardo, after passing away. It teaches how to resolve one's master's oral instructions during the bardo of this life, how to stabilize awareness during the bardo of dying, how to attain enlightenment through recognizing awareness during the bardo of dharmata, and, if necessary, how to be assured a rebirth in a natural nirmanakaya realm during the bardo of becoming and there reveal buddhahood without further rebirths.

== English discourse ==
Namkha'i and Shane (1986, 1999: p. 91) open the discourse of the 'Song of the Vajra' (Wylie: rdo rje'i glu zhig) an excerpt of the Union of the Sun and Moon into the English language and render it thus:

Unborn, yet continuing without interruption,
neither coming nor going, omnipresent,
Supreme Dharma,
unchangeable space, without definition,
spontaneously self-liberating--
perfectly unobstructed state--
manifest from the very beginning,
self-created, without location,
with nothing negative to reject,
and nothing positive to accept,
infinite expanse, penetrating everywhere,
immense, and without limits, without ties,
with nothing even to dissolve
or to be liberated from,
manifest beyond space and time,
existing from the beginning,
immense ying, inner space,
radiant through clarity
like the [S]un and the [M]oon,
self-perfected,
indestructible like a Vajra,
stable as a mountain,
pure as a lotus,
strong as a lion,
incomparable pleasure beyond all limits,
illumination, equanimity,
peak of the Dharma,
light of the [U]niverse,
perfect from the beginning.

== Primary resources ==
- Nyi ma dang zla ba kha sbyor ba chen po gsang ba'i rgyud (@ Wikisource in Wylie)
- ཉི་མ་དང་ཟླ་བ་ཁ་སྦྱོར་བ་ཆེན་པོ་གསང་བའི་རྒྱུད @ Wikisource (Tibetan Unicode)
- nyi zla kha sbyor @ TBRC as PDFs of Pecha
