= Array of Jewels =

Tibetan tantra

The Array of Jewels (Tibetan: ནོར་བུ་ཕྲ་བཀོད, Wylie: nor bu phra bkod) is one of the Seventeen tantras of Dzogchen Upadesha.

== Primary resources ==
- nor bu phra bkod rang gi don thams cad gsal bar byed pa'i rgyud @ Wikisource in Wylie
- ནོར་བུ་ཕྲ་བཀོད་རང་གི་དོན་ཐམས་ཅད་གསལ་བར་བྱེད་པའི་རྒྱུད @ Wikisource in Uchen (Tibetan Script), Unicode
