= Rigdzin Gödem =

Tibet Rigdzin Gödem Nyingma Tertön, (1366)

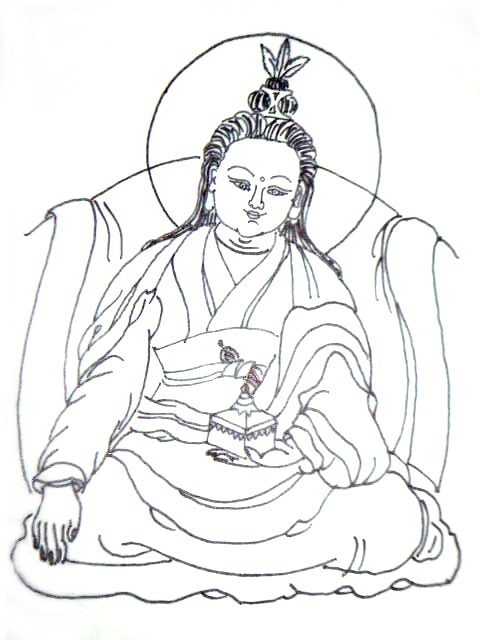
Ridzin Gödem

Rigdzin Gödem (Tib. རིག་འཛིན་རྒོད་ལྡེམ།, rig 'dzin rgod ldem, 1337–1409). also known as Rigdzin Gokyi Demtru Chen and Ngodrub Gyaltsen, was a major Nyingma tertön (a revealer of treasure texts in Tibetan Buddhism). He revealed an important cycle of termas called the "Northern Treasures" or byanggter (because they were found north of the Yarlung Valley). His revelations include the important Pellucid Transcendent State of Samantabhadra (Kun tu bzang po’i dgongs pa zang thal), commonly known as the Gongpa Zangthal. The Gongpa Zangthal was revealed in 1366 in the Tsang province and contains teachings on tantra and Dzogchen. Gödem's revelations also include the famous Prayer of Samantabhadra (Kun bzang smon lam).

According to Malcolm Smith, the Pellucid Transcendent State of Samantabhadra is one of the most important Menngagde collections. According to the Dalai Lama, "the main seat and source of this tradition is the monastery of Thubten Dorje Drak, built in 1632, by the third Rigdzin Chenmo Ngak gi Wangpo."
