= Piled Gems =

Piled Gems, or Rinpo Chepungwa (Tibetan: རིན་པོ་ཆེ་སྤུང་བ, Wylie: rin po che spung ba), is one of the Seventeen tantras of Dzogchen Upadesha.

== Primary resources ==
- Rin chen spungs pa’i yon tan chen po ston pa rgyud kyi rgyal po @ Wikisource in Wylie
- རིན་ཆེན་སྤུངས་པ་ཡོན་ཏན་ཆེན་པོ་སྟོན་པ་རྒྱུད་ཀྱི་རྒྱལ་པོ @ Wikisource in Uchen (Tibetan Script), Unicode
