= Self-arising Primordial Awareness =

Self-arising Primordial Awareness (Tibetan: རིག་པ་རང་ཤར་, Wylie: rig pa rang shar) is one of the Seventeen tantras of Dzogchen Upadesha.

== Text ==
In the Lungi Terdzö (Wylie: lung gi gter mdzod) the prose autocommentary by Longchenpa (1308 – 1364 or possibly 1369) to his Chöying Dzö (Wylie: chos dbyings mdzod) -- which are numbered amongst the Seven Treasuries (Wylie: mdzod chen bdun) -- the following embedded quotation from this Tantra has been rendered into English by Barron, et al. (2001: p. 9) and the Wylie has been secured from Wikisource and interspersed and embedded in the English gloss for probity:

Within the essence of ultimate truth, [yang dag don gyi ngo bo la]
there is no Buddha or ordinary being. [sangs rgyas dang ni sems can med]
Since awareness cannot be reified, it is empty. [rig pa 'dzin pa med pas stong]
Given that it does not dwell in emptiness, [stong pa nyid la me gnas na]
it abides in its own state of supreme bliss. [rang gi bde chen sa la gnas]
The majestic ruler of all buddhas [sangs rgyas kun gyi rje btsan pa]
is understood to be one's own awareness. [rang gi rig pa shes par bya]
This monarch, naturally manifests awareness, [rang snang rig pa'i rgyal po nyid]
is present in everyone, but no one realizes it. [kun la yod de kun gyis rtog pa med]

== Primary resources ==
- Rig pa rang shar chen po'i rgyud @ Wikisource in Wylie
- Rig pa rang shar chen po'i rgyud @ Wikisource in Uchen (Tibetan Script), Unicode
