= Direct Introduction (tantra) =

Direct Introduction (Tibetan: ངོ་སྤྲོད་སྤྲས་པ, Wylie: ngo sprod spras pa) is one of the Seventeen tantras of Dzogchen Upadesha.

== Primary resources ==
- ngo sprod rin po che spras pa'i zhing khams bstan pa'i rgyud @ Wikisource in Wylie
- ངོ་སྤྲོད་རིན་པོ་ཆེ་སྤྲས་པའི་ཞིང་ཁམས་བསྟན་པའི་རྒྱུད @ Wikisource in Uchen (Tibetan Script), Unicode
