= Lion's Perfect Expressive Power =

The Lion's Perfect Expressive Power (Tibetan: སེང་གེ་རྩལ་རྫོགས, Wylie: seng ge rtsal rdzogs) is one of the Seventeen tantras of Dzogchen Upadesha.

== Primary resources ==
- seng ge rtsal rdzogs chen po'i rgyud @ Wikisource in Wylie
- སེང་གེ་རྩལ་རྫོགས་ཆེན་པོའི་རྒྱུད @ Wikisource in Uchen (Tibetan Script), Unicode
