= Sixfold Expanse of Samantabhadra =

The Sixfold Expanse of Samantabhadra (Tibetan: ཀུན་ཏུ་བཟང་པོ་ཀློང་དྲུག, Wylie: kun tu bzang po klong drug) is one of the Seventeen tantras of Dzogchen Upadesha.

== Primary resources ==
- kun tu bzang po klong drug pa'i rgyud @ Wikisource in Wylie
- ཀུན་ཏུ་བཟང་པོ་ཀློང་དྲུག་པའི་རྒྱུད @ Wikisource in Uchen (Tibetan Script), Unicode
