= Self-existing Perfection =

Self-existing Perfection (Tibetan: རྫོགས་པ་རང་བྱུང, Wylie: rdzogs pa rang byung) is one of the Seventeen tantras of Dzogchen Upadesha.

Kunsang (1987, 2007: p.90) provides the following summary of this Dzogchen tantra and foregrounds the premier motif of the four empowerments:

"...[it] teaches how to prepare to be a suitable recipient of the teachings by means of the four empowerments."

== Primary resources ==
- Rdzogs pa rang byung chen po'i rgyud @ Wikisource in Wylie
- རྫོགས་པ་རང་བྱུང་ཆེན་པོའི་རྒྱུད @ Wikisource in Uchen (Tibetan Script), Unicode
