= Vima Nyingtik =

Collection of religious teachings that are studied in Tibetan Buddhism

Vima Nyingthig (Tibetan: བི་མ་སྙིང་ཐིག་, Wylie: bi ma snying thig), "Seminal Heart of Vimalamitra", in Tibetan Buddhism is one of the two "seminal heart" (Tibetan: སྙིང་ཐིག, Wylie: snying thig) collections of the menngagde cycle Dzogchen, the other one being "Seminal Heart of the Dakini" (mkha' 'gro snying thig). Traditionally the teachings are ascribed to Vimalamitra, but they were codified and collated by their Tibetan discoverers in the 11th and 12th century. The main discoverer of the Vima Nyingthig was Zhangtön Tashi Dorjé.

== History ==
The Vima Nyingthig is founded principally on the seventeen tantras and the Troma tantra. It is the teachings both for and of the panditas (Tibetan: རྒྱ་ཆའེ་བ, Wylie: rgya che ba), brought to Tibet by Vimalamitra.

== Contents ==
The Vima Nyingtik itself consists of three sections:

1. tantras (rgyud), which refer to the Seventeen Tantras;
2. āgamas (lung), which are largely Tibetan syntheses; (Note: According to Namkhai Norbu and John Myrdhin Reynolds these agamas were compiled by Vimalamitra (fl. 8th century), and are known as the "five series" (Wylie: sde tshan lnga). They are: the "Golden Letters" (Wylie: gser yig can), the "Turquoise Letters" (Wylie: gyu yig can), the "Copper Letters" (Wylie: zangs yig can), the "Conch Shell Letters" (Wylie: dung yig can); the "Variegated Letters" (Wylie: phra yig can).)
3. upadēśavargas (man ngag); these refer to 119 treatises of pith advice.

== Troma Tantra ==
The "Troma Tantra" or the "Ngagsung Tromay Tantra" otherwise known as the "Ekajaṭĭ Khros Ma'i rGyud" focuses on rites of the protector, Ekajati.

== Seventeen tantras ==
The "Seventeen tantras of the esoteric instruction cycle" (Tibetan: མན་ངག་སྡེའི་རྒྱུད་བཅུ་བདུན, Wylie: man ngag sde'i rgyud bcu bdun ) are supports. These seventeen tantras are to be found in the Nyingma Gyubum (Tibetan: རྙིང་མ་རྒྱུད་འབུམ, Wylie: rnying ma rgyud 'bum, "Canon of the Ancient School"), volumes 9 and 10, folio numbers 143–159 of the edition edited by Jamyang Khyentse Rinpoche, commonly known as Dilgo Khyentse (Thimpu, Bhutan, 1973), reproduced from the manuscript preserved at Tingkye Gonpa Jang (Tibetan: གཏིང་སྐྱེས་དགོན་པ་བྱང, Wylie: gting skyes dgon pa byang) Monastery in Tibet.

== Lineage ==
Rigdzin Kumaradza was a senior disciple of Melong Dorje (1243–1303). Kumaradza studied with the grand master Orgyenpa (1230–1309), who conveyed teachings of "Vimalamitra's Seminal Heart" (Tibetan: བི་མ་སྙིང་ཐིག་, Wylie: bi ma snying thig) upon him.

== Testaments of the knowledge-holders ==
"The Posthumous Teachings of the Vidyadhara" (Tibetan: རིག་འཛིན་གྱི་འདས་རྗེས, Wylie: rig 'dzin gyi 'das-rjes) are found in the Vima Nyingtik. These are the last testaments of the early vidyadharas: Garab Dorje, Mañjuśrīmitra, Sri Singha and Jnanasutra. These testaments are post-humous as they were delivered by the vidhyadhara to their senior disciple from within a thigle of the Five Pure Lights in their rainbow body. In this tradition, the thigle is understood to be comparable to a pure land or mandala. These were first compiled by Vimalamitra in his five series (which consisted of the series of: Golden Letters, Copper Letters, Variegated Letters, Conch Shell Letters and Turquoise Letters). These posthumous teaching belong to the series of the "Golden Letters" (Tibetan: གསེར་ཡིག་ཅན, Wylie: gser yig can).

=== Last testament of Garab Dorje ===
"The Three Statement That Strike the Essential Points" or "The Three Vajra Verses" (Tibetan: ཚིག་གསུམ་གནད་དུ་བརྡེག་པ, Wylie: tshig gsum gnad du brdeg pa)

=== Last testament of Manjushrimitra ===
"The Six Meditation Experiences" (Tibetan: སྒོམ་ཉམས་དྲུག་པ, Wylie: sgom nyams drug pa)

=== Last testament of Śrī Singha ===
"The Seven Nails" (Tibetan: གཟེར་བུ་བདུན་པ, Wylie: gzer bu bdun pa)

=== Last testament of Jñānasūtra ===
"The Four Methods of Establishing Absorption" (Tibetan: བཞགས་ཐབས་བཞི་པ, Wylie: bzhags thabs bzhi pa)

== Vima Nyingtik: Fourth Volume ==
=== The Eleven Themes ===
Scheidegger (2009: p. 43) in a recent work discusses the first four of "The Eleven Themes" (Tibetan: ཚིག་དོན་བཅུ་གཅིག་པ, Wylie: tshig don bcu gcig pa) a work composed by Longchenpa contained in the fourth volume of the Vima Nyingtik.

== Sources ==
- Buswell, Robert; Lopez, Donald S. Jr. (2014), "rdzogs chen (dzokchen)", in Buswell, Robert; Lopez, Donald S. Jr. (eds.), The Princeton Dictionary of Buddhism, Princetopn University Press
- Germano, David; Gyatso, Janet, "Longchenpa and the Possession of the Dakinis", in White, David Gordon (ed.), Tantra in Practice, Motilal Banarsidass Publ.
