= Samten Migdrön =

Tibetan text

Samten Migdrön (Tibetan: བསམ་གཏན་མིག་སྒྲོན, Wylie: bsam gtan mig sgron; alternate nomenclature Wylie: rnal 'byor mig gi bsam gtan) is a Tibetan text of historical importance for the historical relationship of Dzogchen and Zen as well identifying the view of its author, Nubchen Sangye Yeshe.

Namkhai Norbu et al. (1986: p. 23) identify Nubchen Sangye Yeshe as the author of a treatise, Samten Migdrön (Tib. bsam gtan mig sgron).

Dalton (2003: unpaginated) in his introduction to the Anuyoga literature of the Nyingma states that:

Nubchen Sanggyé Yeshé is renowned for having preserved a number of tantric lineages through the so-called “dark period” of Tibetan history (roughly 842-978 C.E.), when state-supported monastic Buddhism fell into decline. Nubchen authored many works, including the Lamp for the Eye in Contemplation (bsam gtan mig sgron), an extensive discussion of early Tibetan contemplative systems.

Samten Gyaltsen Karmay wrote on the Samten Migron.

== The Total Sphere in Six Aspects ==
In the Samten Migdron, the 'Total Sphere' (thig le chen po) is described as having six aspects:

- 'Sphere of the Ultimate Dimension' (dbyings kyi thig le)
- 'Sphere of the Purity of the Ultimate Dimension' (dbyings rnam par dag pa'i thig le)
- 'Sphere of Dharmata' (chos nyid thig le)
- 'Wisdom Bindu' (ye shes thig le)
- 'Sphere of the All-Beneficent (Samantabhadra)' (kun tu bzang po'i thig le)
- 'Sphere of Spontaneous Presence' (lhun kyi[s] grub pa'i thig le)

== Extract and English rendering ==
Karmay (2007: pp. 107–108) renders an extract of the Samten Migdron in English as follows (Tibetan set in Wylie has been included in References for probity, culled from page 108):

"Now, as for expounding the doctrine of Atiyoga, the excellent vehicle, the best and topmost yoga, the mother of all conquerors, its name is the Great Perfection. Why? Because it gives detailed teaching with a view to imparting direct understanding of the principle of this non-sought spontaneity with regard to all existential elements. The sense of the spontaneous essence, which is the innermost treasury of all vehicles and the great "universal grandfather" [spyi myes], is to be experienced directly by "self-awareness" [rang rig pas], but not as a thing to be kept in mind. It is to be made clear to the "self-awareness". How one is to know of it? In this vehicle of the high yoga, there is nothing that can be measured by the discriminative self-intellect as expounded in the tantras, authoritative works and precepts. Why is it so? Because all the so-called elemental particles have never grown new feathers or changed their colour from the beginning. It is the Buddha-nature, the "sphere of the great circle" [thig le chen po'i klong] of the "self-awareness". Who then has seen this as an object? Who has demonstrated the logic for seeing it? To what doctrine does one entrust it? With what cognition does one cognise it? All the elements are non-conceivable, because separately they have no substance."

== English Translations ==
- Dylan Esler: The Lamp for the Eye of Contemplation. Oxford University Press (November 25, 2022)

== Commentary ==
- Khenchen Palden Sherab has written a commentary on the Samten Migdron entitled: Opening the Eyes of Wisdom (Tibetan: གནུབས་ཆེན་སངས་རྒྱས་ཡེ་ཤེས་ཀྱི་བསམ་གཏན་མིག་སྒྲོན་ལེའུ་རྣམས་ཀྱི་སྤྱི་བཤད་མདོར་བསྡུས་ཤེས་རབ་མིག་འབྱེད།, Wylie: gnubs chen sangs rgyas ye shes kyi bsam gtan mig sgron le'u rnams kyi spyi bshad mdor bsdus shes rab mig 'byed/)

== See also ==
- East Mountain Teaching
