= Mañjuśrīmitra =

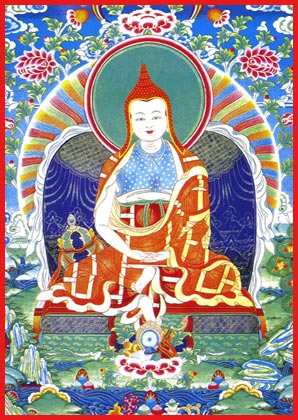
Manjushrimitra.jpg

Mañjuśrīmitra (d. 740 CE) (Tibetan: Jampalshenyen, འཇམ་དཔལ་བཤེས་གཉེན་, Wylie: Jam-dpal-bshes-gnyen) was an Indian Buddhist scholar. He became the main student of Garab Dorje and a teacher of Dzogchen.

== Nomenclature and etymology ==
Mañjuśrī-mitra was his ordination-name—before ordination he was named "Siddhi-garbha" and "Samvara-garbha" His mother's name was Kuhanā.

== Birth and early life ==
The exact location of Mañjuśrīmitra's birth is unknown. Mañjuśrīmitra, the son of an upper class Brahmin from a village to the west of Bodh Gaya, was initially schooled at home. Later he was a resident at Nalanda University where he became a respected Yogācāra scholar and practitioner.

== Works ==
Many of Mañjuśrīmitra's works deal with a tantric text Mañjuśrīnāmasamgīti.

He was the person who divided the Dzogchen teachings into three series of Semde, Longdé and Manngagde.

In the Tibetan Buddhist Vajrayana tradition, Mañjuśrīmitra is held to have transmitted the Dzogchen teachings to Sri Singha. The "Six Meditation Experiences" (Tibetan: Gomnyam Drukpa) concealed in a jewelled casket was Mañjuśrīmitra's "quintessential testament" to Sri Singha, his principal disciple.

One of the main works of Mañjuśrīmitra is Gold refined from ore.

Manjushrimitra discusses the Mindstream (Sanskrit: citta-santana) in the Bodhicittabhavana, a seminal early text of Ati Yoga: "The mental-continuum (citta-santana) is without boundaries or extension; it is not one thing, nor supported by anything." In this work, Manjushrimistra counters and tempers the Madhyamaka of Nagarjuna into what developed into the Mindstream Doctrine. Manjushrimitra makes it clear that intellectualism, philosophy and logic do not lead to realization and that "Those who seek the Truth must turn to direct yogic experience, should they hope to acquire realization."

Vajranatha (2007) contextualises Manjushrimitra and mentions Dzogchen, Chittamatra, Yogachara, Three Turnings of the Wheel of Dharma, and Garab Dorje:

Moreover, in terms of content, it is quite clear that the early Dzogchen Movement of the eighth and ninth centuries did not teach the Chittamatra doctrine of the Yogacharins, even though it borrowed some of the terminology of the earlier school. But it understood these terms in a different manner than did the Yogacharins. The precepts of Dzogchen are found in the Dzogchen Tantras of Atiyoga and not in the Mahayana Sutras of the Third Turning of the Wheel of the Dharma, although later Lama scholars in Tibet noticed the existence of certain similarities in terminology between Dzogchen and Chittamatra. This may be due to the activities of the scholar Manjusrhimitra who wrote a book on Garab Dorje's teaching from the Yogachara perspective.

== See also ==
- Padmasambhava
- Vimalamitra
