= Keith Dowman =

Translator of Tibetan Buddhist texts

Keith Dowman (born 1945) is an English Dzogchen teacher and translator of Tibetan Buddhist texts.

Dowman travelled to India and Nepal in 1966 where he practiced Kriya Yoga with Ganesh Baba and vipassanā meditation with the Indian Theravadin teacher Anagarika Munindra. After connecting with Tibetan Buddhism, he met and trained under many Tibetan masters, including his root gurus Dudjom Jigdral Yeshe Dorje and Kangyur Rinpoche, Longchen Yeshe Dorje. He lived near these masters in Darjeeling, West Bengal, for many years. He studied Classical Tibetan at Queens College, Sanskrit University, in Varanasi, India, under Lama Jamspal. In 1973, at the Nyingma Institute in Berkeley, California, his translations were first published under the auspices of Tarthang Tulku, while he taught on Tibetan language at Sonoma State University.

Dowman has written books and translations focusing on various aspects of Tibetan Buddhism and Tibetan culture including travel literature in particular on Vajrayana and Dzogchen. In his later writings, he has focused increasingly on Dzogchen and in particular on the works of the 14th Century Nyingma master scholar Longchenpa.

Since 1993 he has been teaching and leading retreats on Vajrayana and Dzogchen throughout the world.

== Bibliography ==
- The Great Secret of Mind: Special Instructions on the Nonduality of Dzogchen, by Tulku Pema Rigtsel, (translated and edited by Keith Dowman). Snow Lion, New York, 2012 ISBN 978-1-55939-401-7
- Spaciousness: The Radical Dzogchen of the Vajra Heart (Longchenpa’s Treasury of the Dharmadhatu). Vajrabooks, Kathmandu 2013. ISBN 978-9937-506-97-7
- Maya Yoga: Longchenpa's Finding Comfort and Ease in Enchantment, Vajrabooks, Kathmandu, 2010. ISBN 978-9937-506-45-8
- Old Man Basking in the Sun: Longchenpa's Treasury of Natural Perfection, Vajrabooks, Kathmandu, 2006. Republished as Natural Perfection: Longchenpa's Radical Dzogchen, Wisdom Publications, Boston, MA, 2010. ISBN 978-99946-644-9-8
- Eye of the Storm: Vairotsana's Five Original Transmissions, trans. & comm. Vajrabooks, Kathmandu, 2006. Republished as Original Perfection: Vairotsana's Five Early Transmissions, Wisdom Publications, Boston, MA, 2013. ISBN 99946-644-8-4
- The Sacred Life of Tibet, HarperCollins, London, 1997. ISBN 978-0722533758
- Power-places of Kathmandu, with Kevin Bubriski, Inner Traditions International, Rochester, Vermont, and Thames & Hudson, London, 1995. ISBN 978-089281-540-1
- Flight of the Garuda: The Dzogchen Tradition of Tibetan Buddhism, Wisdom, Boston, 1993. ISBN 0-86171-085-1
- Masters of Enchantment, (illustrated by Robert Beer) Penguin, London 1989. ISBN 0-89281-784-4
- The Power-places of Central Tibet: The Pilgrim's Guide, Routledge & Kegan Paul Ltd., London & New York 1988. ISBN 0-7102-1370-0
- Masters of Mahamudra: Songs and Histories of the Eighty-four Buddhist Siddhas, State University of New York Press, Albany, NY., 1985. ISBN 0-88706-160-5
- Sky Dancer: The Life and Songs of Yeshe Tsogyel, RKP, London 1983; Arkana Series, Penguin 1991; Snow Lion, New York, 1997. ISBN 1-55939-065-4
- The Divine Madman: The Life and Songs of Drukpa Kunley, trans., Rider & Co., London, 1982 and Dawn Horse Press, U.S.A., and Pilgrim’s Publishing, Kathmandu 2000. 1983, 1998; Dzogchen Now! Books, Amazon, 2014. ISBN 0-913922-75-7
- The Legend of the Great Stupa, trans., Dharma Publishing, Berkeley, 1973. ISBN 978-0-89800-344-4

== Works cited ==
- Snelling, John (2011). The Buddhist Handbook: A Complete Guide to Buddhist Teaching and Practice. Ebury Publishing. ISBN 978-1-4464-8958-1.
