= Menngagde =

Division in Tibetan Buddhism and Bon

In Tibetan Buddhism and Bon, Menngagde (Tibetan: མན་ངག་སྡེ་, Wylie: man ngag sde, THL: men-ngak-dé, Sanskrit: upadeśavarga), is the name of one of three scriptural and lineage divisions within Dzogchen (Great Perfection atiyōga).

Dzogchen is itself the pinnacle of the ninefold division of practice according to the Nyingma school of Tibetan Buddhism. Menngagde focuses on rigpa. The Menngagde or 'Instruction Class' of Dzogchen teachings are divided into two parts: trekchö and tögel.

The practice is that of Cutting through Solidity (khregs chod), which is related to primordial purity (ka dag); and Direct Vision of Reality (thod rgal), which is related to spontaneous presence (Ihun grub).

== Practice ==
For general purposes, Menngagde may also be known as Nyingthik. Germano & Gyatso (2000: p. 240) note a similarity of practice between Chan-like formless meditations and Nyingthik/Menngagde:

...the Seminal Heart or Nyingthik (snying thig) form of the Great Perfection (rdzogs-chen) movement, ...a syncretic Tantric tradition consisting of Chan-like practices of formless meditation combined with exercises that cultivated spontaneous visions of buddhas.

== In the Dzogchen textual tradition ==
Traditionally, Mañjuśrīmitra (Wylie: jam dpal bshes gnyen) is said to have classified all the Dzogchen teachings transmitted by his teacher, Garab Dorje, into three series: semdé (Wylie: sems sde), Longdé (Wylie: klong sde), and menngagdé. Mañjuśrīmitra's student Sri Singha reedited the oral instruction cycle and in this form the teaching was transmitted to Jñānasūtra and Vimalamitra. Vimalamitra is said to have taken the Menngagde teachings to Tibet in the 8th Century.

The Glossary for Rangjung Yeshe books described menngagde:

[T]he third of the Three Sections of Dzogchen, as arranged by Manjushrimitra. In Tibet three lineages are represented: through Padmasambhava and Vairotsana who both received transmission from Shri Singha, and through Vimalamitra who received transmission partly from Shri Singha and partly from Jnanasutra. The two former lineages were continued only as termas while Vimalamitra's was passed on both as terma and as oral transmission. In the following millennium, innumerable termas have been revealed containing the precious instructions of these three great masters. The most important of these terma treasures are included in the Rinchen Terdzo, a collection of termas by Jamgon Kongtrul covering the Three Inner Tantras and in Nyingtig Yabzhi.

The three series do not represent different schools of Dzogchen practice as much as different approaches. As is common throughout much Buddhist literature, Tibetan Buddhism in particular, the divisions are sometimes said to represent gradations in the faculties of the students for whom the practices are appropriate; practitioners of low, middling, and high faculties, respectively.

== Distinguishing features ==
The distinguishing features of Menngagde are the practices of lhündrup tögal and kadak trekchö.

Within the instruction section there are two aspects: kadag trekchö, the cutting through of primordial purity, and lhündrub tögal, the direct crossing of spontaneous presence.

Another feature of the menngagde is the sādhanā of the Seven Mind Trainings (Wylie: blo sbyong don bdun ma) Capriles (2003: p. 103) identifies the sādhanā of the "Seven Lojong".

In the cycle of Dzogchen Nyingthik teachings, there is a series of successive reflections called “the seven mind trainings” or seven lojong, the effect of which is similar to the one attributed to the “four reflections:” that of causing one’s mind to become integrated with the meaning of the teaching.

== Four divisions ==
Menngagde itself is sometimes said to have been further divided by Sri Singha into four categories, called the "Four Cycles of Nyingtig" (Wylie: snying thig skor bzhi). They are the:

1. Outer Cycle
2. Inner Cycle
3. Secret Cycle
4. Innermost Unexcelled Cycle (Wylie: yang gsang bla na med pa'i snying thig gi skor)

Variations of the name of the fourth section include the Secret Heart Essence (gsang ba snying thig), the Most Secret Unexcelled Nyingtig (yang gsang bla na med pa snying tig), the Innermost Unexcelled Cycle of Nyingtig (yang gsang bla na med pa'i snying thig skor), the Most Secret and Unexcelled Great Perfection (yang gsang bla na med pa rdzogs pa chen po), the Most Secret Heart Essence (yang gsang snying thig), the Most Secret Unsurpassable Cycle (yang gsang bla na med pa'i sde) and the Vajra Heart Essence.

=== Seventeen tantras ===
This fourth section of menngagde is said to contain the seventeen tantras, although there are eighteen when the Ngagsung Tromay Tantra (focused on protective rites of Ekajati) is added and nineteen including the Longsel Barwey Tantra (Tantra of the Blazing Space of Luminosity).

== See also ==
- Semde
- Longdé
