= Vimalamitra =

8th-century Indian Buddhist monk

Vimalamitra (Tibetan: དྲི་མེད་བཤེས་གཉེན་, Wylie: dri med bshes gnyen) was an 8th-century Indian Buddhist monk. His teachers were Buddhaguhya, Jñānasūtra and Śrī Siṃha. He was supposed to have vowed to take rebirth every hundred years, with the most notable figures being Rigzin Jigme Lingpa, Khenchen Ngagchung, Kyabje Drubwang Penor Rinpoche and Kyabje Yangthang Rinpoche. He was one of the eight teachers of the great Indian adept Padmasambhava. Centuries later, terma and various works were attributed to him. Chatral Sangye Dorji (1913-2016) was said to have received a mala rosary from a man who was at the time dressed as an Indian Sadhu. It was only later that Rinpoche told his attendants that he received a mala on that day from Vimalamitra in reality. The attendants were curious and returned to the place where they had met a sadhu only to be left dumbstruck. The sadhu was not to be found anywhere. One scholar remarked that the historical Vimalamitra "would have been astonished to find himself the focus of such a tradition."

== Attributed works ==
Among the works which have been attributed to Vimalamitra is the Vima Nyingthig. However, scholars are not in agreement as to which works he actually authored.

== See also ==
- Eleven vajra topics
