= Upadeśa =

Upadeśa (Sanskrit: उपदेश), "teaching," "instruction", is the spiritual guidance provided by a guru or spiritual teacher.

== Etymology ==
The term upadeśa has various, related meanings:

- "information," "clarification," "specification"
- "preaching," "prescription"
- "instruction," "guidance," "pointing out to"
- "initiation," "communication of the initiatory mantra or formula"

== Spiritual guidance ==
In Indian religions, both Hinduism and Buddhism, upadeśa is the spiritual instruction and example provided by the guru:

The guru does not merely ask his disciple to perform a task; he helps him by remaining by his side and directing him, indeed remaining close to his heart and showing the pupil the path he must follow in this life.

The term can also be used for the Buddhist Abhidhamma and other religious commentaries.

== See also ==
- Upadesasahasri - A thousand teachings, a text by Adi Shankara
- Ramana Maharshi
