= History of Dzogchen =

History of Dzogchen teachings in Tibetan Buddhism and Bön

A white Tibetan letter A inside a rainbow thigle is a common symbol of Dzogchen.

Dzogchen (Wylie: rdzogs chen, "Great Perfection" or "Great Completion"), also known as atiyoga (utmost yoga), is a tradition of teachings in Indo-Tibetan Buddhism aimed at discovering and continuing in the ultimate ground of existence. The primordial ground (gzhi, "basis") is said to have the qualities of purity (i.e. emptiness), spontaneity (lhun grub, associated with luminous clarity) and compassion (thugs rje). The goal of Dzogchen is knowledge of this basis, this knowledge is called rigpa (Skt. vidyā). There are numerous spiritual practices taught in the various Dzogchen systems for recognizing rigpa.

Dzogchen developed in the Tibetan Empire period and the Era of Fragmentation (9th-11th centuries) and continues to be practiced today both in Tibet and around the world. It is a central teaching of the Yundrung Bon tradition as well as in the Nyingma school of Tibetan Buddhism. (Note: John Pettit: "Great Perfection" variously indicates the texts (āgama, lung) and oral instructions (upadeśa, man ngag) that indicate the nature of enlightened wisdom (rdzogs chen gyi gzhung dang man ngag), the verbal conventions of those texts (rdzogs chen gyi chos skad), the yogis who meditate according to those texts and instructions (rdzogs chen gyi rnal 'byor pa), a famous monastery where the Great Perfection was practiced by monks and yogis (rdzogs chen dgon sde), and the philosophical system (siddhānta, grub mtha') or vision (darśana, lta ba) of the Great Perfection.) In these traditions, Dzogchen is the highest and most definitive path of the nine vehicles to liberation. Dzogchen is also practiced (to a lesser extent) in other Tibetan Buddhist schools, such as the Kagyu, Sakya and the Gelug schools.

== Traditional histories ==
=== Nyingma tradition ===
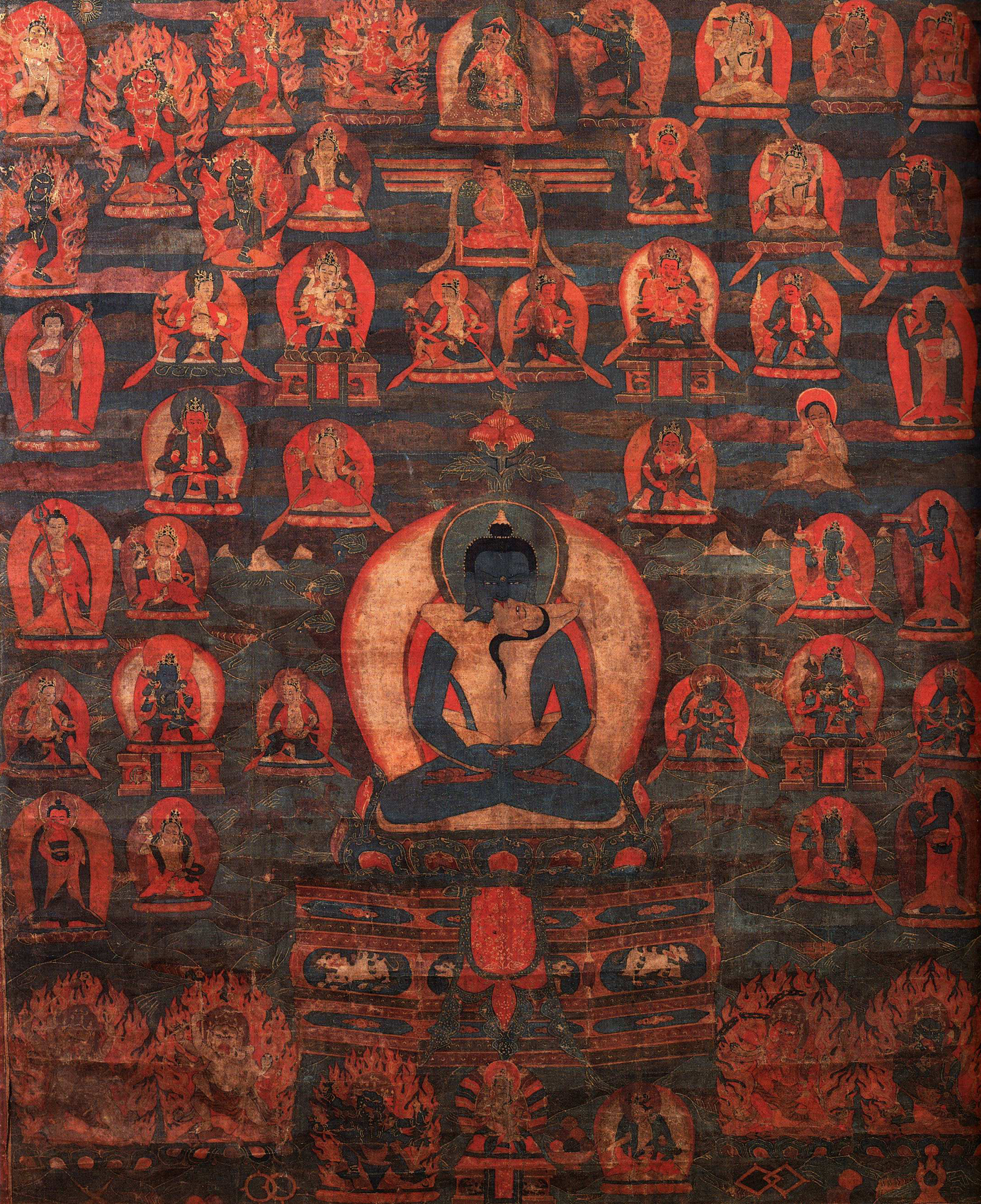
Adi Buddha Samantabhadra.

According to the traditional Nyingma account of the origin of Dzogchen, Dzogchen ultimately originates with the awakened mind of the first Buddha Samantabhadra, the first Buddha to reach awakening and simultaneously a symbol for our own awakened nature, the Dharmakāya. This event happened countless eons ago, before our own universe formed. The millions of manifestations of Samantabhadra teach throughout trillions of world systems, including in ours.

Samantabhadra manifests as the Sambhoghakaya Buddha (called Vajrasattva, or sometimes Vairocana Jñanasaghara) in the Sambhoghakaya Buddhafield of Ghanavyūhakaniṣṭha, which is the supreme buddhafield out of which all Buddhas and buddhafields emanate and where Vairocana teaches Dzogchen to bodhisattvas. Traditional Dzogchen sources add that Dzogchen is taught by the nirmanakayas, i.e. the emanations of the Sambhoghakaya Buddha. They mention that Dzogchen is taught in thirteen world systems as well as on our own world system.

=== Twelve Buddhas ===
The teaching of Dzogchen in our universe is attributed to 12 nirmāṇakāya buddhas (emanations of Vajradhara) which took various forms in different realms. Each appeared at specific times and to specific gatherings of beings and revealed particular Dzogchen teachings to them. These 12 Dzogchen Buddhas are as follows:

1. Khyeu Nangwa Dampa (Acintyaprabhasa, Wyl. ston pa khye'u snang ba dam pa, "Supreme Child Inconceivable Vision"). This Buddha appeared as a young child during a time when the lifespan of beings was incalculable and beings had bodies of light. He taught the root tantra of the seventeen tantras, the sGra thal ‘gyur tantra.
2. Khyeu Ö Mitrukpa (Aksobhyaprabha, Wyl. ston pa khye'u 'od mi 'khrugs pa, "Child Imperturbable Light"), appeared at the time when the lifespan of beings was ten million years and taught Dzogchen to dakinis
3. Jikpa Kyob (Wyl. ston pa 'jigs pa skyob, "Mind that Protects from Fear") appeared during the time that the lifespan of beings was one hundred thousand years and taught several tantras to bodhisattvas
4. Shyönnu Rolpa Nampar Tsewa (Wyl. ston pa gzhon nu rol pa rnam par brtse ba, "Young Manifestation of Compassion"), appeared during the time that the lifespan of beings was eighty thousand years. He taught eleven tantras to a retinue of yaksas.
5. Dorje Chang (Wyl. ston pa rdo rje 'chang, "Vajra Holder") also known as "Vajradhara, the Six", appeared as a bodhisattva in the realm of the Thirty-Three Gods, during the time that the lifespan of beings was seventy thousand years. He taught Dzogchen to the next seven Buddhas.
6. Shyönnu Pawo Tobden (Kumaravirabalin, Wyl. ston pa gzhon nu dpa' bo, "Young Powerful Hero"), appeared when the average life span had diminished to sixty thousand years. He was a reincarnation of Dorje Chang and was born from a yaksa and a dakini in the Cemetery of the Secret Manifestation. He appeared as a dwarf with three faces and six hands. He taught the Rig pa rang shar tantra and other tantras to seven bodhisattvas and to countless, who dakinis, devas and nagas.
7. Drangsong Tröpé Gyalpo (Wyl. ston pa drang srong khros pa'i rgyal po, "Wise Wrathful King"), during the time of a ten thousand year average lifespan, this Buddha was born in the realm of the raksas and taught Dzogchen to ten million raksasas.
8. Ser Ö Dampa (Survarnaprabhasa, Wyl. ston pa gser 'od dam pa, "Supreme Golden Light"), during the time of a five thousand year average lifespan, this Buddha was born on Vulture Peak. He taught innumerable sravakas.
9. Tsewé Rolpé Lodrö (Wyl. ston pa brtse bas rol pa'i blo gros, "Intelligence Manifestation of Compassion") during the time of a one thousand year average lifespan, this Buddha was born in northern Mongolia. He taught the All-creating King (Kun byed rgyal po) and Total Space (Nam mkha’ che) to countless bodhisattvas.
10. Ösung Drepo (Kasyapa the Elder, Wyl. ston pa 'od srung bgres po) during the time of a five hundred year average lifespan, this Buddha was born in the human realm.
11. Ngöndzok Gyalpo (Wyl. ston pa mngon rdzogs rgyal po, "Perfected King"), during the time of a three hundred year average lifespan, this Buddha was born in Vajrasana (Bodhgaya).
12. Shakyamuni Buddha (Wyl. ston pa shAkya thub pa), the Buddha of our current era.

=== Garab Dorje's lineage in India and Tibet ===
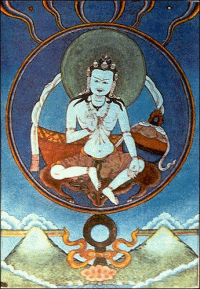
Garab Dorje

According to the Nyingma tradition, the first human lineage holder of the Dzogchen teachings was Garab Dorje (Skt. Prahevajra or Vajraprahe). The Nyingma tradition considers Garab Dorje to have been an awakened being who received teachings from Vajrapani in the deva realms and then willingly incarnated on earth to teach Dzogchen.

According to Dudjom Rinpoche, Garab Dorje was a great Buddhist adept from Oddiyana who taught the Dzogchen teaching to the dakinis. Oddiyana may have been located in Pakistan's Swat Valley region. Given that Garab Dorje is said to have taught Mañjuśrīmitra, who was a scholar at Nalanda University, Garab Dorje's date cannot be much earlier than the 4th or 5th centuries CE. Garab Dorje taught Dzogchen to numerous disciples, some of which are discussed in the Dzogchen literature, including: King Dhahenatalo, his son Prince Thuwo Rajahati, Princess Barani, and Lui Gvalpo Gawo.

Garab Dorje also taught Dzogchen to the master Mañjuśrīmitra, who is said to have divided the Dzogchen doctrine into three series (Mind, Space and Esoteric Instruction; sem-de, long-de, and men-ngak-de). Mañjuśrīmitra's main students were Buddhajñanapada and Śrī Siṃha (according to Dudjom, it is also possible that they were the same person).

Śrī Siṃha was an important figure in the transmission of Dzogchen to Tibet. Śrī Siṃha's students were Jñanasutra, Vimalamitra, Vairotsana and Padmasambhava. The three series of Dzogchen teachings were brought to Tibet by the students of Śrī Siṃha in the late 8th and early 9th centuries. According to the Nyingma tradition, these teachings were concealed or hidden away as termas ("treasure texts" meant for future times) by figures like Padmasambhava, his consort Yeshe Tsogyel and Vimalamitra, during the 9th century, when the Tibetan empire disintegrated. These figures also considered to have emanated in later eras as various Dzogchen teachers and tertons (treasure revealers). For example, Rigdzin Kumārāja (1266-1343) is considered to be an emanation of Vimalamitra.

From the 10th century forward, innovations in the Nyingma tradition were largely introduced historically as revelations of these concealed scriptures, known as terma.

=== Bon tradition ===
According to the Bön Tradition, Dzogchen originated with the founder of Bön, the Buddha Tonpa Shenrab Miwoche, who lived 18,000 years ago, ruling the kingdom of Tazik, which supposedly lay west of Tibet. Tonpa Shenrab transmitted these teachings to the region of Zhang-zhung, the far western part of the Tibetan cultural world.

== History in the Nyingma school ==
=== Origins (7th–10th century) ===
The terms "Atiyoga" (as a higher practice than Tantra) and "Dzogchen" do appear in 8th and 9th century Indian tantric texts (such as the Guhyagarbha Tantra), though they do not refer to a separate vehicle (yana) in these texts.

According to David Germano, there is no independent attestation of the existence of any separate traditions or lineages under the name of "Dzogchen" or "Atiyoga" outside of Tibet. Dzogchen proper may therefore be a unique Tibetan Buddhist teaching, drawing on multiple influences, including both native Tibetan non-Buddhist beliefs and Chinese and Indian Buddhist teachings. However, Germano also notes that "there is no question" that the characteristic apophatic language found in Dzogchen can also be found in some Indian tantras.

In Tibetan Sky-Gazing Meditation and the Pre-History of Great Perfection Buddhism, Flavio Geisshuesler notes that many of the key motifs pervading this religious tradition are actually invoking a pre-Buddhist heritage rather than Mahāyoga teachings of Indian Buddhist origins. He provides a long list of idiosyncratic motifs of the Great Perfection tradition, which centers primarily on the prioritization the sky as a source of enlightened energy typical of sky gazing meditation. Based on a close reading of the Seventeen Tantras, he shows that this energy is described as sheep that are chained together, and the yogi interacts with them by imitating their behavior and attempting to capture them in fence-like structures. The luminous pathways inside the meditator's body are described as animalistic vitality, such as deer-hearts, silk-channels, buffalo-horns, or far-reaching lassos. The accompanying techniques involve the use of contemplative paraphernalia associated with such animals and their most characteristic traits, like silk. The culmination of the practice is when the practitioner's body turns into a rainbow body, dissolving into the sky by transforming into light. The author argues that these traits point to the Great Perfection's true identity as a tradition centered on the "quest for vitality" that is not suffused by a Buddhist or Indian ethos of freedom and liberation, but rather by indigenous Tibetan priorities.

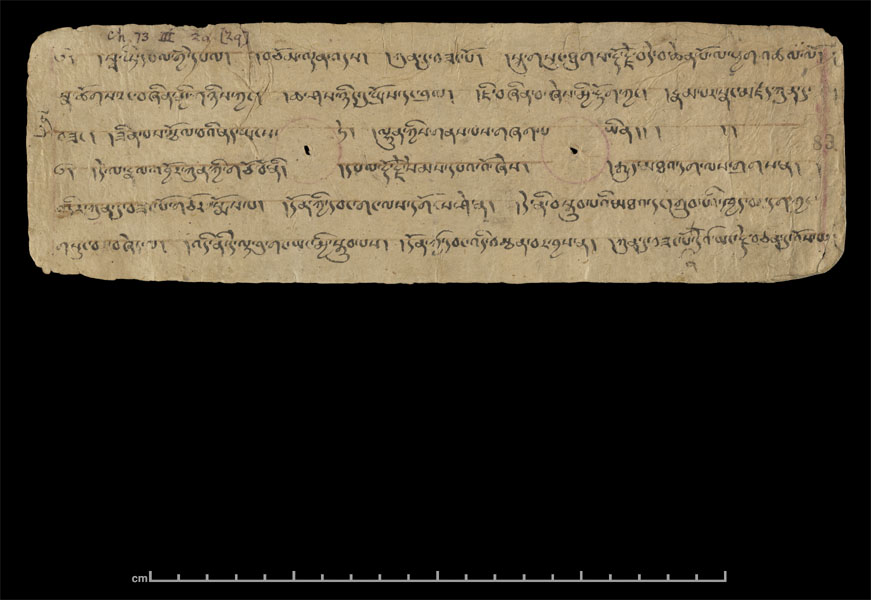
Part of the Dzogchen text The cuckoo of awareness, from Dunhuang.

Francis V. Tiso notes that in the 7th century there were "anthologies of sutra quotations in circulation suggestive of the dzogchen approach." During the reign of the Tibetan King Trisong Detsen (742-797) various Indian teachers which are associated with Dzogchen according to traditional Tibetan accounts (such as Padmasambhava, Vimalamitra and Vairotsana). However, from a strictly historical perspective, little is known about Dzogchen in the time of the Tibetan Empire (7th-9th centuries).

The earliest sources on Dzogchen are from the Dunhuang caves and include texts such as The Cuckoo of Awareness (Rig pa'i khu byug), The Small Hidden Grain (gSangs rgyas sbas pa) attributed to Buddhagupta, Questions and Answers of Vajrasattva and Gold Refined from Ore (rdo la gser zhun).

There are two main interpretations of the relationship between Dzogchen and Tantric Practices among modern academics (and thus of how Dzogchen originated as an independent tradition):

- that early Dzogchen represented a distinct tradition separate from tantric Mahāyoga (Germano)
- that early Dzogchen was not a separate tradition and always developed within tantric Mahāyoga (van Schaik)

==== Distinct movement ====
The idea that Dzogchen was a distinct movement was proposed by Samten Karmay in his study The Great Perfection. Samten proposed that Dzogchen was a "new philosophy" based on the doctrines of "primal spontaneity" (ye nas lhun gyis grub pa) and "primeval purity" (kadag) that developed between the 9th and 10th centuries. He notes that Chan Buddhism played a part in the development of early Dzogchen literature. He also explains how early Dzogchen had a close connection to tantric Mahāyoga practices and doctrines, but saw itself as outside of it.

American Tibetologist David Germano has also defended a similar view of the early development of Dzogchen which emphasizes the difference between early Dzogchen and tantric yoga practice. He argues that early Dzogchen:

defined itself by the rhetorical rejection of such normative categories constituting tantric as well as non-tantric Indian Buddhism. This pristine state of affairs known as the "Mind Series" (sems sde) movement stemmed above all from Buddhist tantra as represented by the Mahayoga tantras, but was also influenced by other sources such as Chinese Chan and unknown indigenous elements.

Germano points out that the early Dzogchen literature "is characterized by constant rhetorical denials of the validity and critical relevance" of mainstream Tantric practice. He points to "the ninth chapter of the Kun byed rgyal po, where normative tantric principles are negated under the rubric of the "ten facets of the enlightening mind's own being" (rang bzhin bcu). (Note: "there is no meditative cultivation of a view; no preserving of commitments; no skill or exertion in enlightened activities; no obscuration of primordial gnosis; no cultivation or refinement of meditative stages; no path to traverse; no subtle phenomena; 9 no duality with relationships (between such discrete phenomena); no delineation of definitive scriptures aside from the mind; and no resolution in terms of esoteric precepts since it is beyond all reductionism, whether reifications or negations." - Germano (1994)) Germano calls the early Dzogchen traditions "pristine Great Perfection" because it is marked "by the absence of presentations of detailed ritual and contemplative technique" as well as a lack of funerary, charnel ground and death imagery (which is a feature of later Dzogchen traditions that Germano terms 'Funerary Great Perfection'). Instead it "consists of aphoristic philosophical poetry with terse experiential descriptions lacking any detailed outline of practice."

Germano further notes that the "early Great Perfection movements were rhetorically (at least) linked to rejection of more literal tantric interpretations (power sub-stances in general and body-fluids in particular, as well as graphic violence and sexuality), de-emphasis of the profusion of contemplative techniques, stress on direct experience rather than scholastically mediated knowledge, de-emphasis of ritual, mocking of syllogistic logic (despite its not infrequent use), and in general resistance to codifications of rules for any life-processes."

Instead of the mainstream tantric techniques, Germano holds that in early Dzogchen practice:

the basis of contemplation appears to largely have been a type of extension of "calming" practices at times involving concentration exercises as preparatory techniques, but ultimately aiming at a technique free immer-sion in the bare immediacy of one's own deepest levels of awareness. Thus formless types of meditation were valorized over the complex fab-rication of visual images found in other tantric systems such as Mahayoga, though it may very well be that during these early phases it was largely practiced in conjunction with other types of more normative tantric practices of that type.

In the following centuries, under the influence of the Sarma "New Translation" schools, the Dzogchen tradition continued to reinvent itself and give birth to new developments and Dzogchen systems.

==== Form of mahayoga ====
According to Sam van Schaik, who studies early Dzogchen manuscripts from the Dunhuang caves, the Dzogchen texts are influenced by earlier Mahayana sources such as the Laṅkāvatāra Sūtra and Indian Buddhist Tantras with their teaching of emptiness and luminosity, which in Dzogchen texts are presented as 'ever-purity' (ka-dag) and 'spontaneous presence' (lhun-grub). van Schaik also notes that there is a discrepancy between the histories as presented by the traditions, and the picture that emerges from those manuscripts.

According to van Schaik, the term atiyoga (which refers to Dzgochen) first appeared in the 8th century, in an Indian tantra called Sarvabuddhasamāyoga. (Note: Tibetan has a ninefold classification scheme for the Buddhist teachings. First come the vehicles of the śrāvakas, pratyekabuddhas and bodhisattvas. Then come the three vehicles of "outer" yoga, and then the three vehicles of "inner" yoga. The "inner yoga" vehicles are Mahāyoga, Anuyoga and Atiyoga. The Dzogchen teachings are part of Atiyoga.) In this text, Anuyoga is the stage of yogic bliss, while Atiyoga is the stage of the realization of the "nature of reality." According to van Schaik, this fits with the three stages of deity yoga as described in a work attributed to Padmasambhava: development (kye), perfection (dzog) and great perfection (dzogchen). Atiyoga here is not a vehicle, but a stage or aspect of yogic practice. In Tibetan sources, until the 10th century Atiyoga is characterized as a "mode" (tshul) or a "view" (lta ba), which is to be applied within deity yoga.

According to van Schaik, the concept of rdzogs chen, "great perfection," first appeared as the culmination of the meditative practice of deity yoga (Note: The visualization of a deity and recitation of his or her mantra.) around the 8th century. The term dzogchen was likely taken from the Guhyagarbhatantra. This tantra describes, as other tantras, how in the creation stage one generates a visualisation of a deity and its mandala. This is followed by the completion stage, in which one dissolves the deity and the mandala into oneself, merging oneself with the deity. In the Guhyagarbhatantra and some other tantras, there follows a stage called rdzogs chen, in which one rests in the natural state of the innately luminous and pure mind.

In the 9th and 10th centuries deity yoga was contextualized in Dzogchen in terms of nonconceptuality, nonduality and the spontaneous presence of the enlightened state. Some Dunhuang texts dated at the 10th century show the first signs of a developing nine vehicles system. Nevertheless, Anuyoga and Atiyoga are still regarded then as modes of Mahāyoga practice. Only in the 11th century came Atiyoga to be treated as a separate vehicle, at least in the newly emerging Nyingma tradition. Nevertheless, even in the 13th century (and later) the idea of Atiyoga as a vehicle was controversial in other Buddhist schools. Van Schaik quotes Sakya Pandita as writing, in his Distinguishing the Three Vows:

If one understands this tradition properly,
Then the view of Atiyoga too
Is wisdom and not a vehicle.

=== Early Dzogchen (9th–10th century) ===
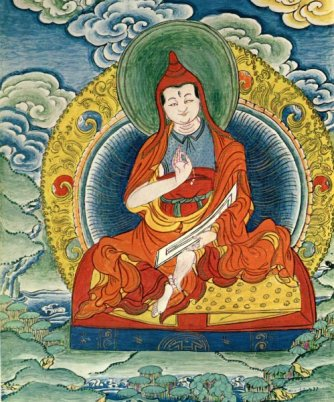
Vairotsana

According to Germano, most of the early Dzogchen literature, which state that they are translations, are original compositions from a much later date than the 8th century. According to van Schaik, the earliest manuscripts available are from Dunhuang. According to Germano, the Dzogchen tradition first appeared in the first half of the 9th century, with a series of short texts attributed to Indian saints. The most of important of these are the "Eighteen Great Scriptures" (Lung-chen bco-brgyad), which were referred to as "mind oriented" (sems phyogs), and later became known as "mind series" (sems de). The colophons of these early mind series texts principally attribute these texts to Śrī Siṅgha, Vairotsana and Vimalamitra.

Another group of early Dzogchen texts are the "five early translations" (sNga-'gyur lnga). The focus of all these texts is the "mind of enlightenment" (byang-chub-kyi sems, Skt. bodhicitta). According to Sten Anspal, this "refers to the true nature of a person's consciousness, which is essentially identical to the state of Buddha. The texts explain how accessing and abiding in this pure and perfect state of consciousness fulfills and surpasses all the various practices and methods of other Buddhist approaches."

The mind series reflect the teachings of early Dzogchen, which rejected all forms of practice, and asserted that striving for liberation would simply create more delusion. One has simply to recognize the nature of one's own mind, which is naturally empty (stong pa), luminous ('od gsal ba), and pure. According to Germano, its characteristic language, which is marked by naturalism and negation, is already pronounced in some Indian tantras.

Nevertheless, these texts are still influenced by tantric Mahayoga, with its visualisations of deities and mandalas, and complex initiations (if only because of their rejection of these elements). Van Schaik notes that early Dzogchen texts are concerned with other key terms such as rigpa (gnosis, knowledge) which refers to non-dual and non-conceptual awareness, and spontaneous presence (lhun gyis grup pa).

Christopher Hatchell explains that for early Dzogchen "all beings and all appearances are themselves the singular enlightened gnosis of the buddha All Good (Samantabhadra, Kuntu Zangpo)", and that it "also shows a disinterest in specifying any kind of structured practices or concepts via which one could connect with that gnosis. Rather, the tradition argues, there is nothing to do and nothing to strive for, so the reality of All Good will manifest in its immediacy just by relaxing and letting go." This tendency can be seen in the short Semde text "The Cuckoo of Awareness" (rig pa'i khu byug):

In variety, there is no difference.
And in parts, a freedom from elaborations.
Things as things are, are not conceptual, but
The shining forth of appearances is All Good.
Since you are finished, cast off the sickness of effort!
Resting naturally, leave things [as they are].

This method of pointing the meditator to the direct experience of the true nature of reality that is immediately present was seen as superior to all other Buddhist methods, which were seen as intellectual fabrications. However, according to van Schaik, this rhetoric does not necessarily mean that practitioners of Dzogchen did not engage in these lower practices.

During the 9th and 10th centuries these texts, which represent the dominant form of the tradition in the 9th and 10th centuries, were gradually transformed into full-fledged tantras, culminating in the Kulayarāja Tantra (kun byed rgyal po, "The All-Creating King"), in the last half of the 10th or the first half of the 11th century. According to Germano, this tantra was historically perhaps the most important and widely quoted of all Dzogchen scriptures.

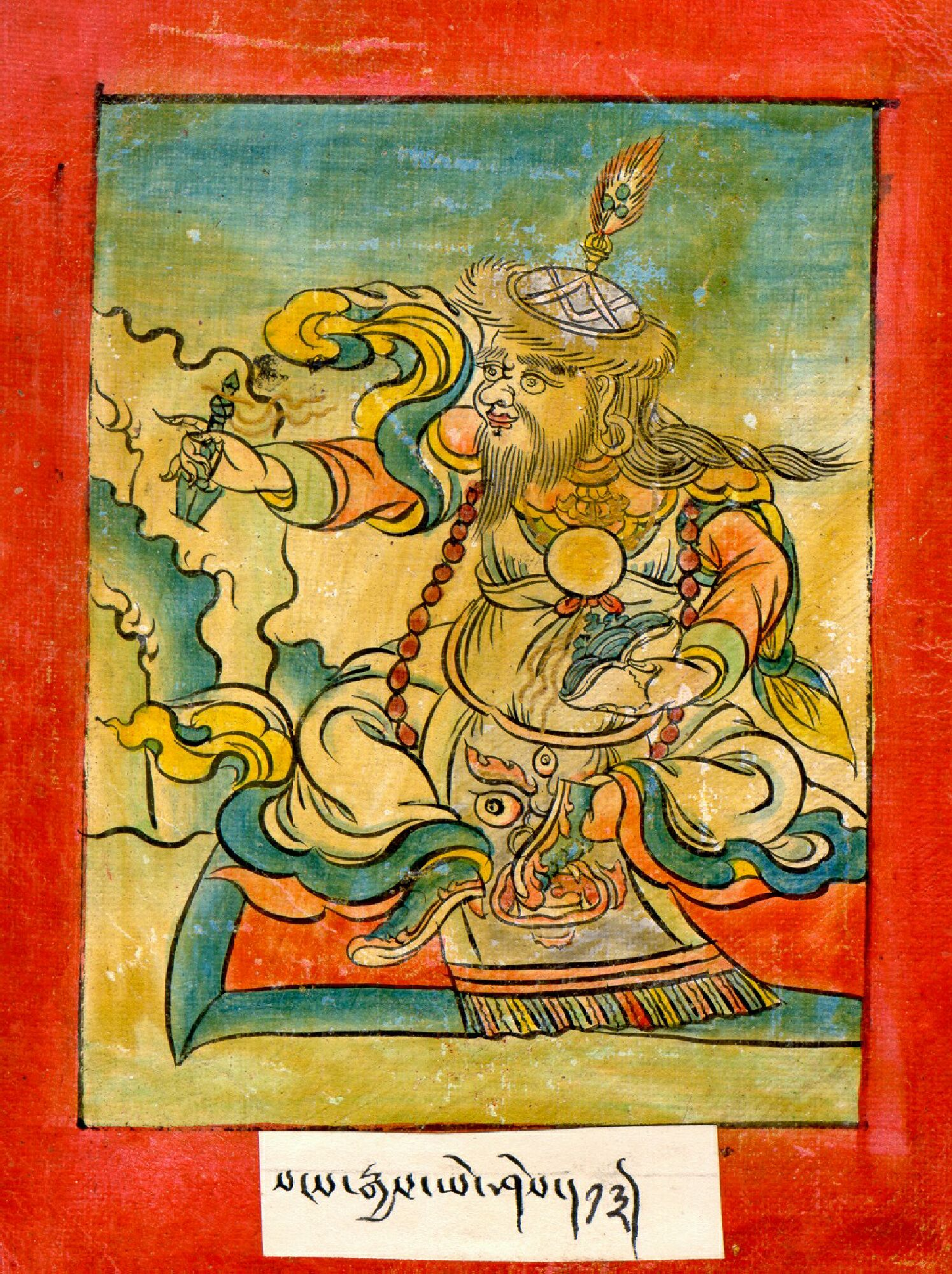
Nubchen Sanggye Yeshe (832-962)

The work of Nubchen Sangye Yeshe (9th century) is also an important source for the mind series traditions, particularly his Samten Migdrön. By the 11th century these traditions developed in different systems such as the Kham, the Rong and the Nyang systems, which according to Ronald Davidson "are represented by texts surviving from the thirteenth to sixteenth centuries"). The Kham yogi Aro Yeshe Jungne (a ro ye shes 'byun gnas, 10th century) is particularly interesting, as he was said to have united the teachings of Dzogchen and the Chan lineage of Heshang Moheyan in his own Kham system known as the Mental Position system (A-ro lugs).

By the 13th century, these traditions began to be slowly displaced "by the over-whelming success of more vision oriented movements such as the Seminal Heart."

=== Renaissance period (11th–14th century) ===
The Dzogchen tradition was completely transformed in the 11th century, with the renaissance of Tibetan culture occurring from the late 10th century to the early 12th century, known as the later dissemination of Buddhism. New techniques and doctrines were introduced from India, resulting in new schools of Tibetan Buddhism (the "New Translation" or "modernist" schools, i.e. Sarma). These new Buddhist schools criticized many of the texts and practices of the "old ones" (Nyingmapas) as unauthentic, since many could not be traced to Indian sources.

This challenge led to an explosion of new developments in Dzogchen doctrine and practice, with a growing emphasis on the new tantrism. The older Bon and Nyingma traditions incorporated these new influences through the process of Treasure revelation (terma). These new texts were considered to be hidden treasures buried by earlier figures such as Vairotsana, Songtsen Gampo, Vimalamitra and Padmasambhava that were then discovered by "treasure revealers" (tertons). These terma texts as well as the works of Nyingma Dzogchen commentators such as Rongzom were used to mount a scholarly defense of Dzogchen against the Sarma critiques.

The Indian Buddhist Yogini Tantras and other Anuttarayoga Tantras influenced the development of new Dzogchen texts in this period, especially the Instruction series. These Buddhist tantras made use of taboo imagery which was violent, horrific and erotic. These influences are reflected in the rise of subtle body practices, new pantheons of wrathful and erotic Buddhas, increasingly antinomian rhetorics, and a focus on death-motifs within the new Dzogchen literature of this period.

Also during this period, new "visionary yogas" that lead to spontaneous visual experiences (and which do not require the use of the active visualization) were incorporated into the emerging Dzogchen systems. According to Hatchell, these visionary practices bear some similarity to those found in the Indian Kalacakra system. Both of these systems include the use of dark-retreat and sky-gazing, specialized "gazes" and postures, as well as "a sequence of visions that progresses from unstructured spots of light to encounters with fully formed deities, and a tendency to use these visions as the basis for philosophical discussion."

These Tantric ideas were incorporated in several movements such as the "Secret Cycle" (gsang skor), "Ultra Pith" (yang tig), "Brahmin's tradition" (bram ze'i lugs), the "Space Class Series," and especially the "Instruction Class series" (Menngagde), which culminated in the "Seminal Heart" (snying thig), which emerged in the late 11th and early 12th century.

Even the Mind Series tradition adopted some elements from Buddhist tantra (though its focus remained on less complex images). According to Germano, Longchenpa's Trilogy of Natural Ease (ngal gso skor gsum) is "the classical example of these transformed Mind Series-based contemplative systems."

=== Space series ===
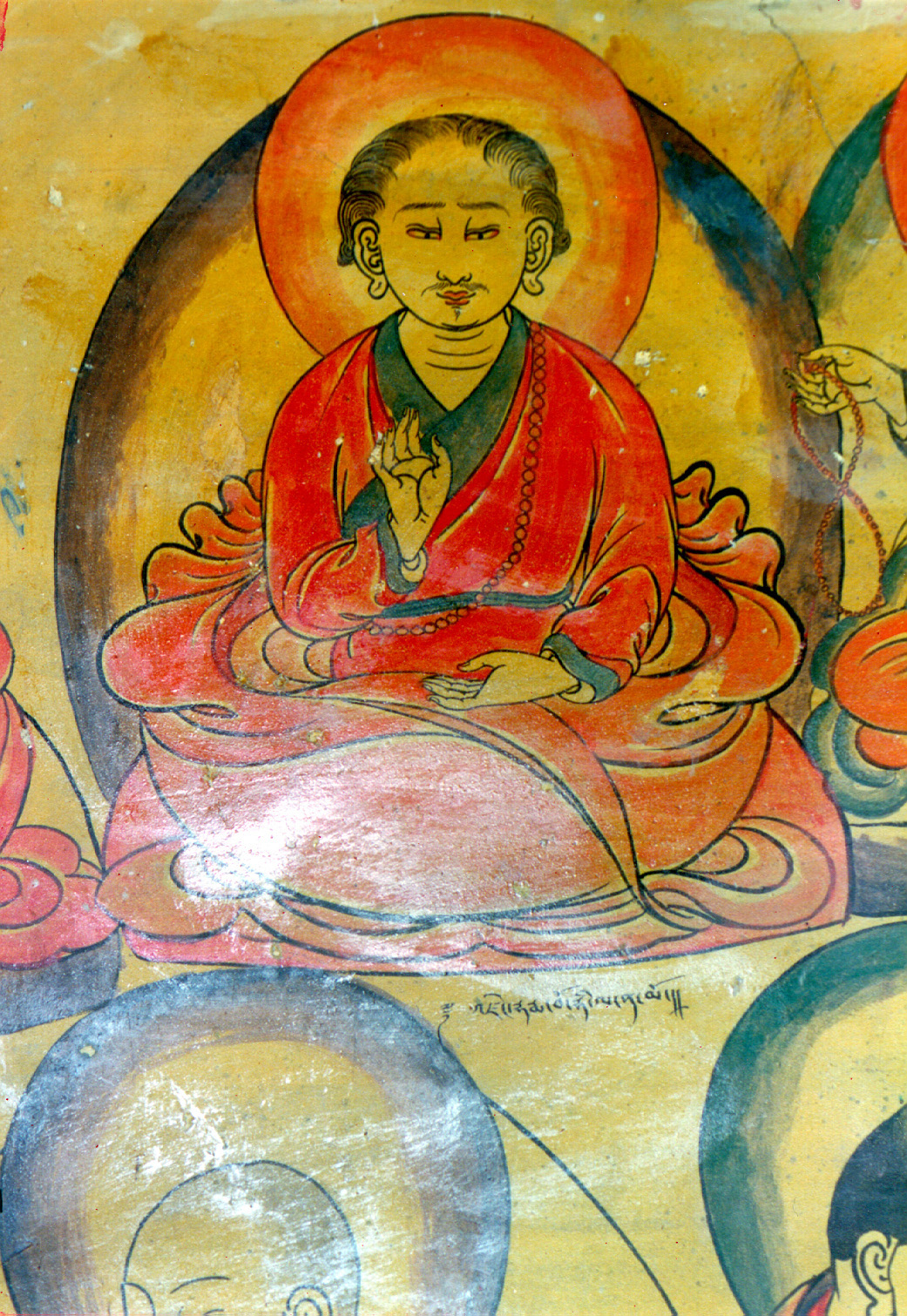
'Dzeng Dharmabodhi, (b.1052 - d.1168), a master of the Vajra Bridge

The series of Space (Longdé), reflects the developments of the 11th–14th centuries and emphasizes "space" or "expanse" (klong). According to Sten Anspal this class of texts "is difficult to define or characterize uniformly" and "were not unified into a single system". Because of this, it has been seen either as nearly identical with the earlier Semde (Mind) Series, or as "occupying doctrinally a position between Mind and lnstruction Section."

According to Anspal, "Space" in these texts "is used to describe aspects in which the individual's true nature of mind is analogous to space. For example, space is present everywhere and no effort is needed to reach it; it cannot be transcended: it is immense. encompassing everything: it is devoid of characteristics and cannot be apprehended; it is without center or periphery; it is eternal and uncaused; there is no support in space and nothing to focus on: and so forth." One of the central themes of these texts is the doctrine of "the Nine Spaces" (The Spaces of View, Behavior, Mandala, Initiation, Commitment, Activity, Accomplishment, Levels - Paths, and Fruition). Each of these practices which refer to features of Buddhist tantra, is said to be spacious and complete within one's true nature and thus gradualist and tantric practices are seen as unnecessary for those who understand their mind's true nature. So, for example, there is no need to create a mandala in one's mind to practice, since when one realizes the true nature of mind, all perceptions are the mandala. Likewise, there is no need to go through ritual initiation, since realizing one's nature is already an initiation. In this sense, Dzogchen is seen as transcending tantra.

As noted by Anspal, some Space Series tantras like Equal to the End of Sky (Nam-mkha'i mtha'-dang mnyam-pa) "do not prescribe any particular techniques for the practitioner, such as physical postures or movements, structured meditative exercises, etc." In this sense, they are similar to Mind Series Tantras.

Another tradition which is often grouped as part of the Space Series is the Vajra Bridge (rdo rje zam pa) tradition. These texts include numerous tantric rites connected with Heruka and three Dakinis. However, the commentaries on Vajra Bridge texts indicate that these tantric rituals are auxiliary practices that "are secondary to the main practice that is Great Perfection contemplation of the nature of mind, and which is not here practiced in the formalized context of Tantric sadhana." A key figure in this tradition is 'Dzeng Dharmabodhi (1052-1168). His student, Kun-bzang rdo-rje, wrote numerous commentaries on Vajra Bridge. The key Tantra of this tradition was entitled Secret Wisdom (Ye-shes gsang-ba). The following verse "was interpreted as the essential summary of the way of contemplation in the rDo-rje zam-pa":

With one's body in a secluded place, cut the attachment to external [sense data] and internal [conceptuality], [assume the posture endowed with] seven characteristics, (chos bdun), and balance the physical elements ('byung-ba) [of the body]. Without blocking the six sense aggregates, settle in mere ordinary awareness. Externally, the elements of the body are balanced; internally, inhalation and exhalation are absent. One arrives at the meaning of uncontrived naturalness. That which is called "human being" is Buddha. There is no Vajrasattva apart from oneself.

In the Vajra Bridge tradition, contemplation of the true nature of mind, which was also referred to as "non-meditation", was introduced through the use of "four signs", which "are the experiences of non-conceptuality (mi-rtog-pa), clarity (gsal-ba), bliss (bde-ba) and the inseparability (dbyer mi-phyed-pa) of the first three as the fourth." Some of the Vajra Bridge texts also make use of subtle body yogas of winds (vayus), though they are relatively simple and "effortless" (rtsol-bral) in comparison to the wind yogas of the completion stage found in the Sarma tantras, which are seen as inferior and coarse by the Vajra Bridge authors such as Kun-bzang rdo-rje.

=== Secret instruction series ===
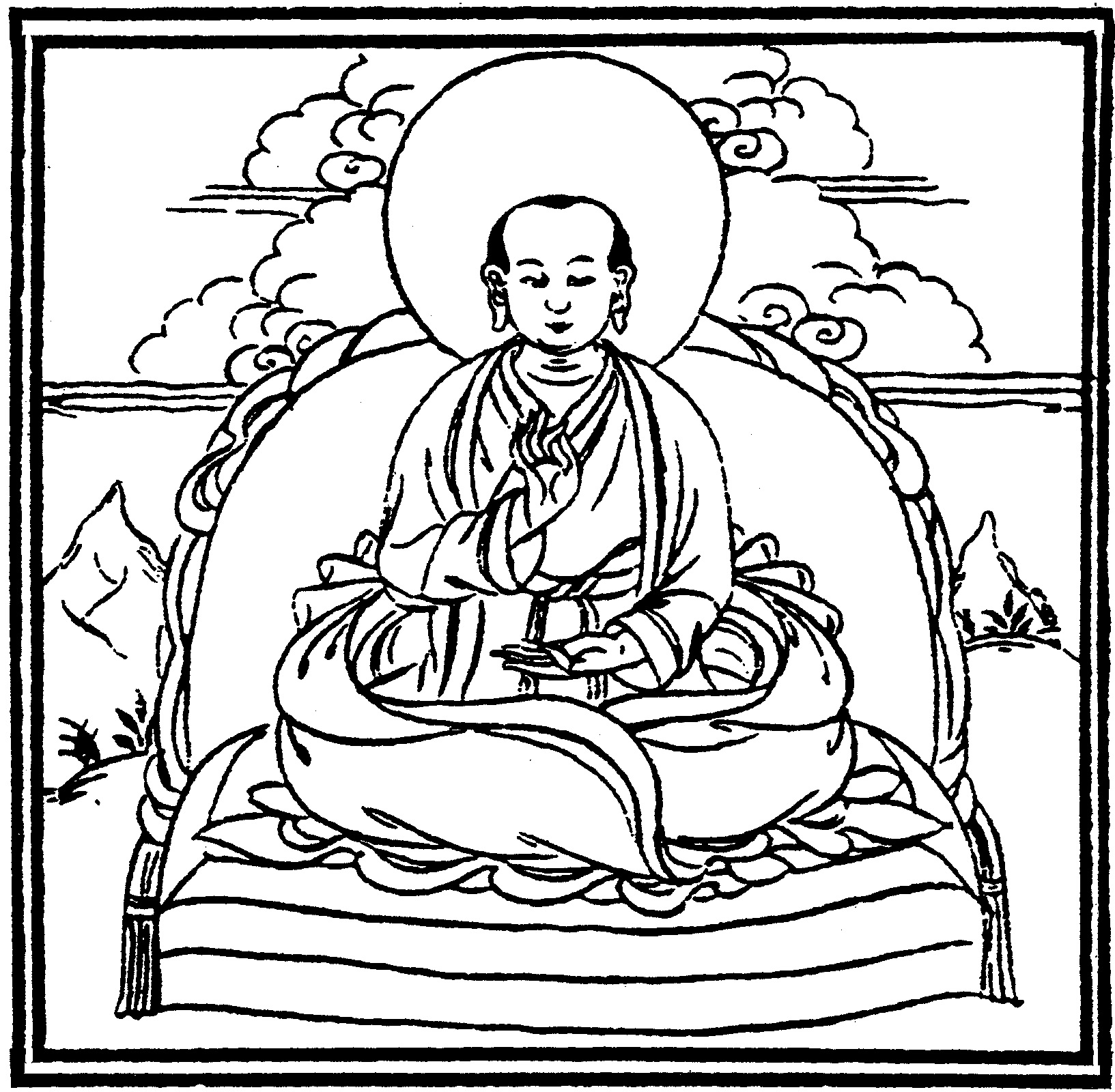
Zhangton Tashi Dorje (1097-1127), the terton who revealed the Vima Nyingtik

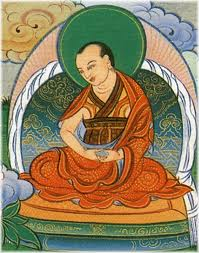
Rigdzin Kumaradza, an important figure in the Seminal Heart tradition of the renaissance period

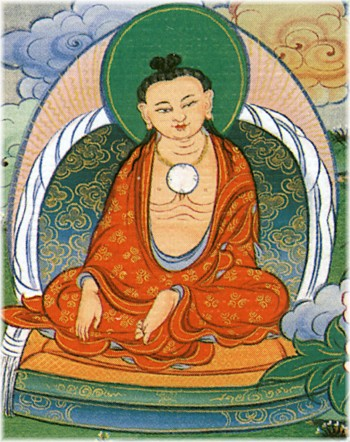
Melong Dorje, wearing a Melong (mirror), which is a symbol of ka dag

The most influential texts of the instruction series are the Seventeen Tantras (rgyud bcu bdun) and the two "seminal heart" collections, namely the Vima Nyingthig, (bi ma snying thig, "Seminal Heart of Vimalamitra") and the Khandro Nyingthig (mkha' 'gro snying thig, "Seminal Heart of the Dakini").

The Seventeen Tantras are treasure texts (terma) appear around the 11th century, stating that they are translations of past masters like Vairocana and Vimalamitra. According to Germano, the first "historically attested" figure connected with these tantras is Chetsün Sengé Wangchuk (lce btsun seng ge dbang phyug, c. 11th century). The Vima Nyingthig is attributed to Vimalamitra, but was likely composed by its discoverer, Zhangton Tashi Dorje (1097-1127). Meanwhile, the Khandro Nyingthig was revealed by terton Pema Ledrel Tsal (padma las 'brel rtsal, 1291–1315).

As noted by Hatchell, these texts present themselves as being taught by Buddhas like Samantabhadra and discuss numerous topics including: "cosmogony, the subtle body, speculation on the gnostic "ground" that underlies the world, buddha-nature, discussions of light-energy, practical techniques for calming the mind and producing visions, ritual empowerments, mandala construction, signs of meditative accomplishment, postdeath states, attaining liberation after dying, funerary rituals, relics, prognostications for the time of death, subjugation rituals, strange recipes, and advice for dealing with zombies."

There is an emphasis on the importance of "funerary" topics such as death and the intermediate state (bardo) as well as visions of peaceful and fierce deities. The Secret Instruction series texts saw themselves as the highest of all Dzogchen teachings, and they eventually overshadowed the other two classes.

Hatchell explains the core worldview of the Seminal Heart texts as follows:

all of the world’s beings, objects, and appearances are said to rise up from the “ground” (gzhi) of reality, which in its primordial state is a field of pure possibility, beyond differentiation. Awareness serves as the dynamic, knowing dimension of this ground and acts as a kind of luminous vibrancy that “lights up” (snang) from the ground, creating appearances through its “dynamic energy” (rtsal). In this view, all appearances are simply the “play” (rol pa) or the “radiation” (gdangs) of awareness, with some appearances (such as visionary ones) being awareness appearing in its unclouded intensity, while others (like ordinary objects) are only its dimmed derivations.

The main difference between enlightened and confused beings is whether or not they "recognize" (ngoshes pa) their nature as the primordial ground. Unenlightened beings are said to fail to recognize the non-dual nature of reality and thus mistakenly see the external world as separate from their themselves as subjects. This creates a false duality between self and other that leads to attachment.

The Secret Instruction division focuses on two aspects of spiritual practice: kadag trekchö, "the cutting through of primordial purity", and lhündrub tögal, "the direct crossing of spontaneous presence". According to Hatchell, trekchö is a class of meditations that cultivate "a stable, vivid awareness with the goal of becoming attuned to the mind’s emptiness and primordial purity." This is influenced by earlier teachings of the Mind series and on classic Buddhist calm-abiding (samatha, zhi gnas) and special-insight (vipasyana, lhag mthong).

Tögal constitutes a unique feature of the Instruction tradition, which mainly deal with visionary meditations through practices such as dark retreat and sky gazing. The theory behind these practices is that, through yogic techniques, pure awareness can be induced to emerge through the eyes and appear as a series of visions. According to Hatchell, this is an opportunity "for the yogi to realize that the visionary appearances “out there” are none other than presencings of an internal awareness, and thus to undo the basic error of ignorance."

According to Germano, the uniqueness of the Seminal Heart tradition lies in its "focus on the spontaneous dynamics (lhun grub) of the Ground, a spontaneity which one visually experiences in mandalic images in death and death-in-life, i. e. contemplation." The Seminal Heart innovations can be seen as fourfold according to Germano:

1. It articulates a deeply phenomenological and partially mythic overarching narrative about the origination and telos of the human world that serves to structure the entire tradition. This can be summed up by a primordial ground, its unfolding in the ground-presencing, its split into samsara and nirvana and its culmination in enlightenment.
2. It directly introduces visionary practices into the heart of Great Perfection contemplation in a way intertwined with this evolutionary or developmental ethos. This is the "Direct transcendence" discourse.
3. It incorporates a wide range of tantric types of practices as auxiliary and supporting praxis, which on the whole involve relatively simple techniques of visualization in contrast to the intricate mandalas of modernist focus.
4. It injects a far greater range of tantric doctrines into its discourse, ranging from subtle body theory to the set of one hundred peaceful and wrathful deities based on the five Buddha families.

The Vima Nyingthig categorized Dzogchen texts (and Atiyoga teaching in general) into three classes which later became the normative way of classifying Dzogchen literature:

- The Mind Series (sems sde; the earliest teachings existing prior to the 11th century diffusion),
- The Space series (klong sde, 11th–14th centuries),
- The Intimate Instruction Series (man ngag sde, 11th–14th centuries).

During the 13th to 14th centuries, the Seminal Heart teachings became widely circulated by figures such as Melong Dorje, Rigdzin Kumaradza and the 3rd Karmapa Rangjung Dorje. Over time, the Seminal Heart tradition became the dominant Dzogchen tradition and its textual divisions became standard.

=== Pith traditions ===
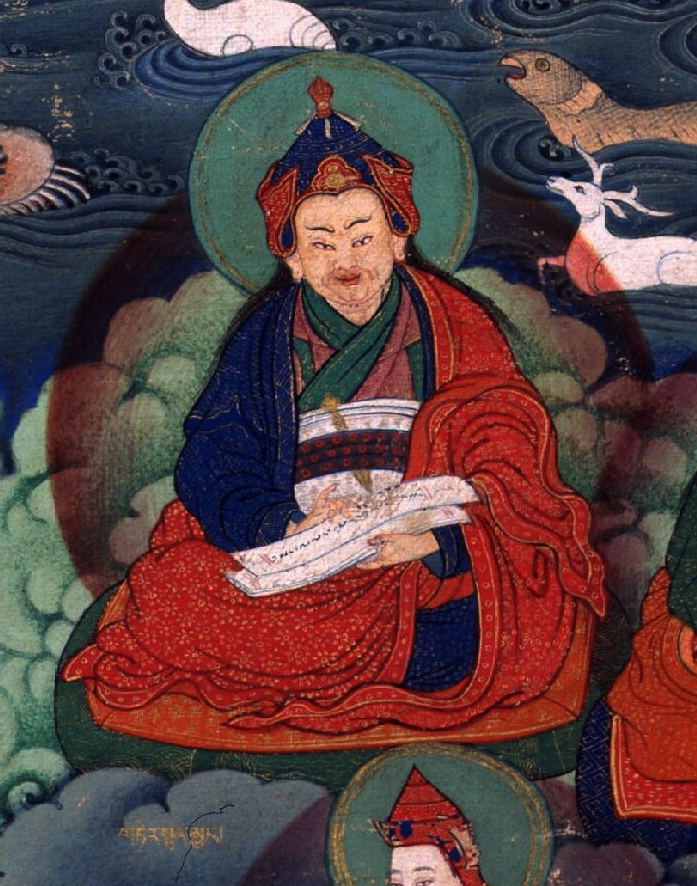
Nyangrel Nyima Ozer, 11th century terton of the Crown Pith cycle.

There were also other Dzogchen traditions, such as the "pith" (ti) traditions (such as the Crown Pith, and Ultra Pith) which were contemporary with the development of the Seminal Heart canon. Some of these represented a re-assertion of earlier Dzogchen trends which were somewhat critical of the Seminal Heart systems.

One of the most important of these conservative voices of the 12th century, Nyangrel Nyima Özer (Nyang ral nyi ma 'od zer, 1136–1204 (Note: In the eleventh and twelfth centuries there were several competing terma traditions surrounding Vimalamitra, Songtsen Gampo, Vairotsana and Padmasambhava. At the end of the 12th century, there was the "victory of the Padmasambhava cult." Nyangrel Nyima Özer was the principal architect of the Padmasambhava mythos. The Maratika Cave is referred to in Tibetan literature from the 12th century. Kathang Zanglingma, a terma with the biography of Padmasambhava, revealed and transmitted by Nyangrel Nyima Ozer, narrates the "events: which made the Maratika caves a sacred place for Vajrayana practitioners.)), developed his "Crown Pith" (spyi ti) to reassert the older traditions in a new form. According to Germano, this figure is also "one of the main architects of the Padmasambhava mythos". Another important figure of the Crown Pith tradition is Guru Chowang (1212-1270).

Crown Pith tantras such as the Tantra of the Luminous Expanse identify themselves the "Peak of the Nine Vehicles". As noted by Germano, a common motif of these works is that Crown Pith is superior to the Great Perfection or Transcendence Yoga, sometimes even stating that Crown Pith is a 10th Vehicle. This indicates that Nyima Özer was critical of other Dzogchen trends of his time.

These writings, which were also presented as revelations from Padmasambhava, are marked by a relative absence of Yogini Tantra influence, and transcend the prescriptions of specific practices, as well as the rhetoric of violence, sexuality and transgression. Germano notes that "instead of the blood and violence of later Tantra, we find lyrical and elegant verses on light and darkness, purity and pollution, freedom and bondage, illusion and reality, plurality and unity, embodiment and mind." According to Germano, in Crown Pith texts "the subordinated Transcendent Pith Great Perfection (ati dzokchen) is consistently associated more with the side of manifestation and vision and is described as retaining a degree of exertion, conceptuality, and focus on appearances, while the Crown Pith is presented as an uncompromising non-duality zeroed in on original purity (kadak).

=== Systematization under Longchenpa (14th century) ===
A pivotal figure in the history of Dzogchen was Longchenpa Rabjampa (kLong chen rab 'byams pa, 1308–1364, possibly 1369). He revived the Seminal Heart teachings by bringing together the two main Seminal Heart cycles (the Vima and Khandro nyingthigs). To these he added two new collections authored by himself, the Lama Yangtig and the Khadro Yangtig, as well as a third collection, the Zabmo Yangtig. This compilation effort eventually led to all these cycles being passed down in one great combined cycle called the Nyingtig Yabshi.

In his highly influential corpus of commentaries include the Seven Treasuries (mdzod bdun), the Trilogy of Natural Freedom (rang grol skor gsum), and the Trilogy of Natural Ease (ngal gso skor gsum). Longchenpa's works systematized the numerous Dzogchen teachings in a coherent structured form. He refined the terminology and interpretations of Dzogchen, and integrated the Seminal Heart teachings with broader Mahayana and Vajrayana literature. With Longchenpa's highly influential synthesis, the Seminal Heart teachings came to dominate the Dzgochen discourse in the Nyingma school while earlier traditions became marginalized. Later Dzogchen cycles were all influenced by Longchenpa's corpus.

Malcolm Smith notes that Longchenpa's Tshig don mdzod (Treasury of Subjects) was preceded by several other texts by other authors dealing with the same topics, such as The Eleven Subjects of The Great Perfection (Note: rdzogs pa chen po tshig don bcu gcig pa bzhugs so) by Nyi 'bum (12th century). This itself was derived from the eighth and final chapter of the commentary to The String of Pearls Tantra. According to Smith, Nyi 'bum's Eleven Subjects provided the outline upon which Longchenpa's Treasury of Subjects was based, using the general sequence of citations, and even copying or reworking entire passages.

=== Later developments ===
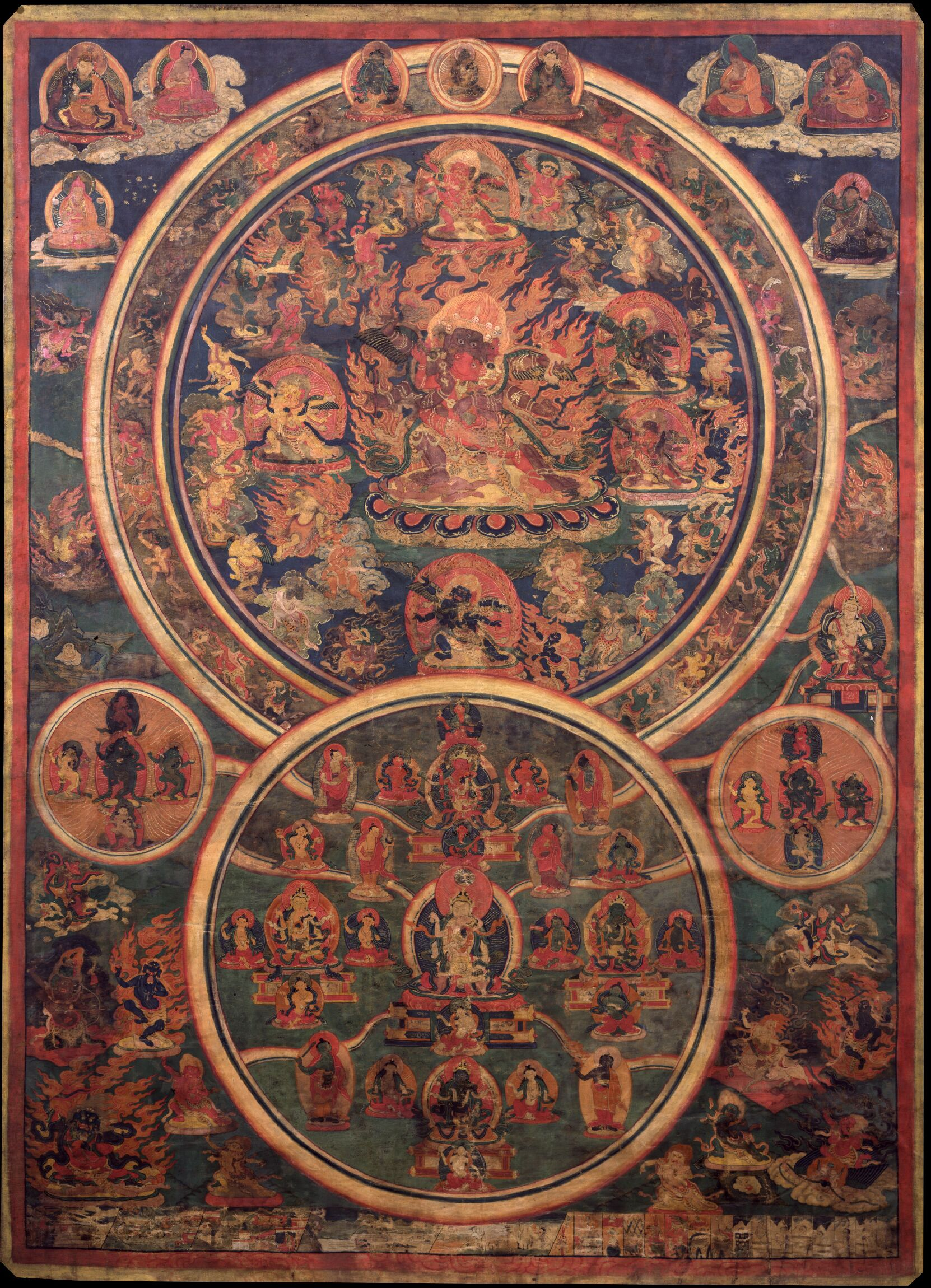
Peaceful and fierce deities of the post-mortem intermediate state (bardo).

In subsequent centuries more additions followed, including the Profound Dharma of Self-Liberation through the Intention of the Peaceful and Wrathful Ones (kar-gling zhi-khro) (Note: zab-chos zhi-khro dgongs-pa rang-grol) by Karma Lingpa, (1326–1386), popularly known as "Karma Lingpa's Peaceful and Wrathful Ones", which includes the two texts of the bar-do thos-grol (sometimes titled The Tibetan Book of the Dead). (Note: The bar-do thos-grol was translated by Kazi Dawa Samdup (1868–1922), and edited and published by W.Y. Evans-Wenz. This translation was popularized as The Tibetan Book of the Dead, but contains many mistakes in translation and interpretation.)

Other important termas are The Penetrating Wisdom (dgongs pa zang thal), revealed by Rigdzin Gödem (rig 'dzin rgod ldem, 1337–1409); and The Nucleus of Ati's Profound Meaning (rDzogs pa chen po a ti zab don snying po) by Terdak Lingpa (gter bdag gling pa, 1646–1714).

However, the most influential of the later revelations are the works of Jigme Lingpa (1730–1798). His Longchen Nyingthig (klong chen snying thig), "The Heart-essence of the Vast Expanse" or "The Seminal Heart of the Great Matrix", is supposed to be a terma from Padmasambhava. According to Germano, this cycle was based on the work of Longchenpa, but altered it and systematized it in new ways, mainly by "drawing upon normative (and transformed) deity visualization-oriented practices as found in Mahayoga cycles for its key structural framework."

Germano also writes that this cycle is "much more ritualistic and conventionally tantric in nature" than the work of Longchenpa and "also grants a far more prominent role to traditional sadhanas (i. e. meditative sessions relying on prescribed and detailed visualizations)." The Longchen Nyingthig is said to be the essence of the Seminal Heart and has become known as the "later Nyingthig." It is one of the most widely practiced teachings in the contemporary Nyingma school.

=== 19th and 20th centuries ===
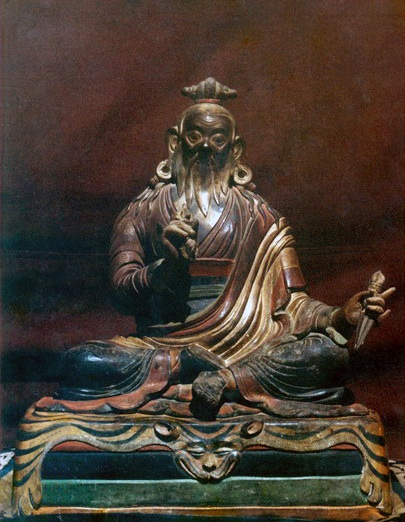
Dudjom Lingpa

The next major development in the history of Dzogchen is the Rime movement (non-sectarian or non-partisan movement) of the 19th and 20th centuries. A leading figure of this movement and an influential terton was Jamyang Khyentse Wangpo (1820–1892). According to Germano, this period saw the continuation of a move towards more normative tantric doctrine and contemplation in Dzogchen. There was a rise in the production of scholastic and philosophical literature on Mahayana topics from the Dzogchen perspective, culminating in the works of Ju Mipham (1846-1912), who wrote numerous commentaries and texts on Buddhist Mahayana philosophy. There was also an increased focus on monastic institutions in Nyingma.

A major Dzogchen terma cycle which was revealed during this period was the Dudjom Tersar, which includes the revelations of Dudjom Lingpa (1835–1904) and his successor Dudjom Jigdral Yeshe Dorje or "Dudjom Rinpoche" (1904–1987).

In the early 20th century the first publications on Tibetan Buddhism appeared in the western world. An early publication on Dzogchen was the so-called Tibetan Book of the Dead, edited by W.Y. Evans-Wentz, which became highly popular, but contains many mistakes in translation and interpretation.

Dzogchen has been popularized and spread outside of Tibet by the Tibetan diaspora, starting with the Tibetan exile of 1959. Well-known teachers which have taught Dzogchen in the western world include Dudjom Rinpoche, Nyoshul Khenpo, Tulku Urgyen, Dilgo Khyentse, Namkhai Norbu, Chögyam Trungpa, Dzogchen Ponlop, and Mingyur Rinpoche. A few of these figures were also tertons (treasure revealers). Some of these figures from the Tibetan diaspora also founded organizations for the preservation and practice of Dzogchen, such as Namkhai Norbu's International Dzogchen Community.

== In the Bön and Sarma traditions ==
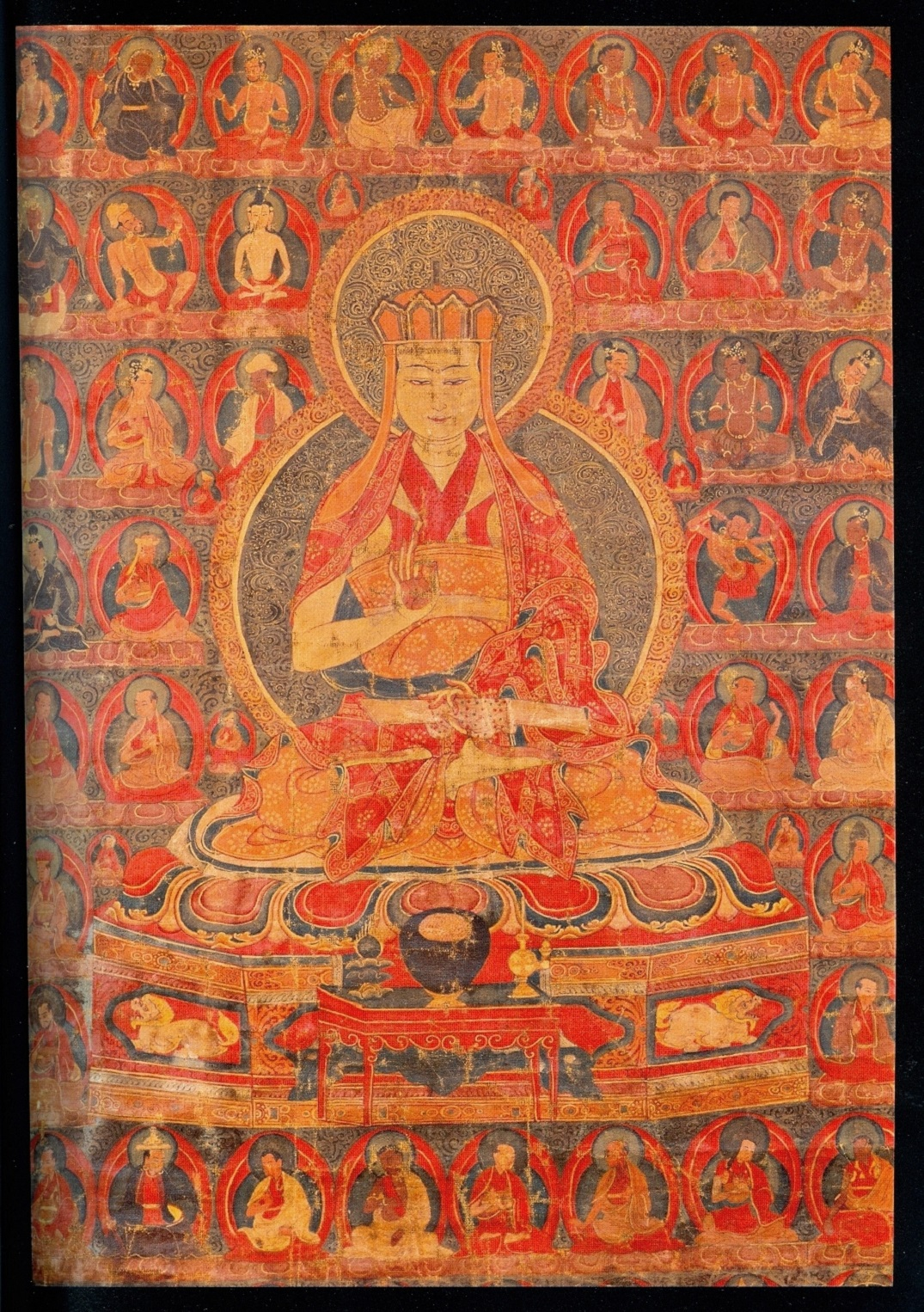
A thangka depicting the lineage lamas of the Aural Tradition of Zhangzhung.

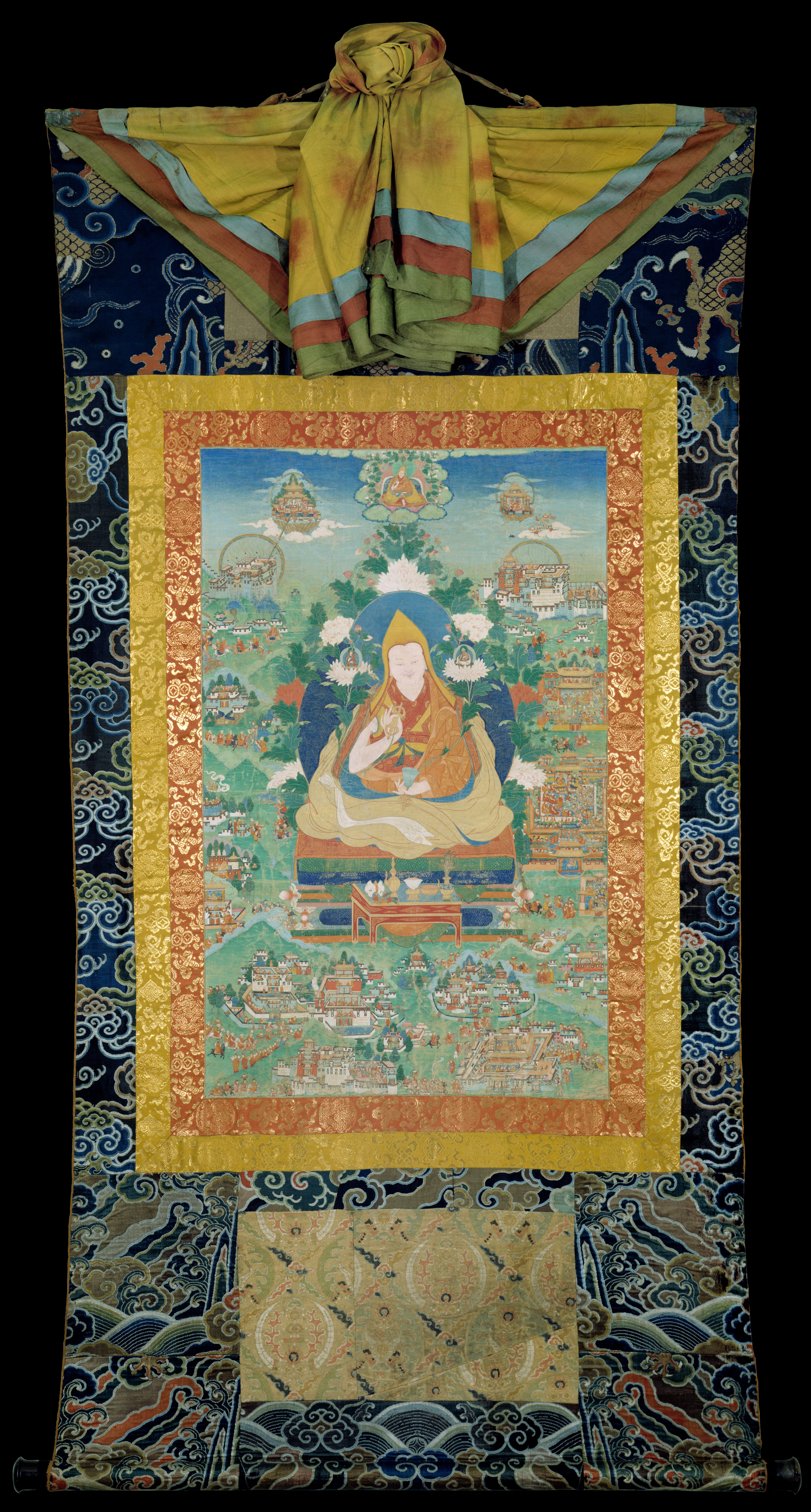
A thangka depicting the fifth Dalai Lama.

=== Bön ===
The Bön tradition has its own unique set of Dzogchen teachings and texts (including tantras and termas). The Bön tradition states that these teachings were taught by a Buddha known as Tonpa Sherab. They are believed to have been brought to central Tibet from the north Tibetan kingdom of Zhang-zhung. The earliest Bön literature only exists in Tibetan manuscripts, the earliest of which can be dated to the 11th century. There are three main Bon Dzogchen traditions:

- Dzogchen. This is based on a terma associated with the Buddhist monk Vairocana named Lho-brag-ma, discovered by the terton gZhod-ston dNgos-grub grags-pa in 1088. It is very similar to Nyingma Dzogchen.
- A-khrid ("The System Leading to the Ultimate (=A)"). This tradition was founded by rMe'u dgongs-mdzod ri-khrod chenpo, 'The Meditation-Treasury, the Great Hermit, of (the family of) rMe'u', who lived 1038–1096.
- The Zhang-zhung Aural Lineage (zhang-zhung nyen-gyu). This tradition is based on the Zhang zhung snyan rgyud, which is supposed to have been taught by Tonpa Sherab and to have arrived to Tibetan from the kingdom of Zhang-zhung.

=== Kagyu ===
Dzogchen has also been taught and practiced in the Karma Kagyu lineage, beginning with the Third Karmapa, Rangjung Dorje (1284–1339) who received Dzogchen teachings from Padma Ledre Tsal and Kumaraja, and founded a new Dzogchen lineage, the Karma Nyingtik.

The first Karma Chagme (1613-1678), Rāga Asya also established a Dzogchen practice lineage based on his transmission of the Namchö ("Sky Dharma") terma. Several Kagyu figures of the Rime Movement such as Jamgön Kongtrul also wrote on and received Dzogchen teachings.

The Drikung Kagyu also have a terma tradition of Dzogchen teachings, the Yangzab Dzogchen.

=== Sakya ===
Various Sakya lamas were also Dzogchen practitioners, including Jamyang Khyentse Wangpo and Khyentse Chokyi Wangchug.

=== Gelug ===
Lozang Gyatso, 5th Dalai Lama (1617–1682), Thubten Gyatso, 13th Dalai Lama ( 1876–1933), and Tenzin Gyatso, 14th Dalai Lama (present), all Gelugpas, are also noted Dzogchen masters. The fifth Dalai Lama had numerous Nyingma teachers and was also a terton who revealed a Dzogchen terma cycle through his pure visions known as the Sangwa Gyachen (Bearing the Seal of Secrecy). The current Dalai Lama, Tenzin Gyatso, has given empowerments from this cycle.

The 14 Dalai Lama has also affirmed that Dzogchen is valid:

That the very roots of Nyingma are valid and accord with reality was recognized even by Tsongkhapa, who received teachings on the Nyingma doctrine of the Great Completeness from the great adept from Hlodrak, Namkha Gyeltsen (lho brag grub chennam mkha’ rgyal mtshan, 1326-1401).

The adoption of the practice of Dzogchen by the Dalai Lamas has been a source of controversy among more conservative members of the Gelug tradition and the 14th Dalai Lama also acknowledges that within Gelug tradition there have been many refutations and criticisms of Dzogchen (but he notes that these are not found in Tsongkhapa's works).

Nevertheless, the 14th Dalai Lama affirms that the view of Dzogchen and the view of the Sarma schools "all come down to the same thought," and cites the First Panchen Lama in support of this view.

== See also ==
Teachers

- Dilgo Khyentse
- Dudjom Rinpoche
- Dzogchen Rinpoche
- Dzongsar Khyentse Chökyi Lodrö
- Lopön Tenzin Namdak

- Namkhai Norbu Rinpoche
- Nyoshul Khenpo Rinpoche
- Sogyal Rinpoche
- Surya Das
- Trulshik Rinpoche

Terms

- Ganachakra
- Lukhang
- Mahamudra
- Ngagpa
- Trul khor
