= Kulayarāja Tantra =

Buddhist text

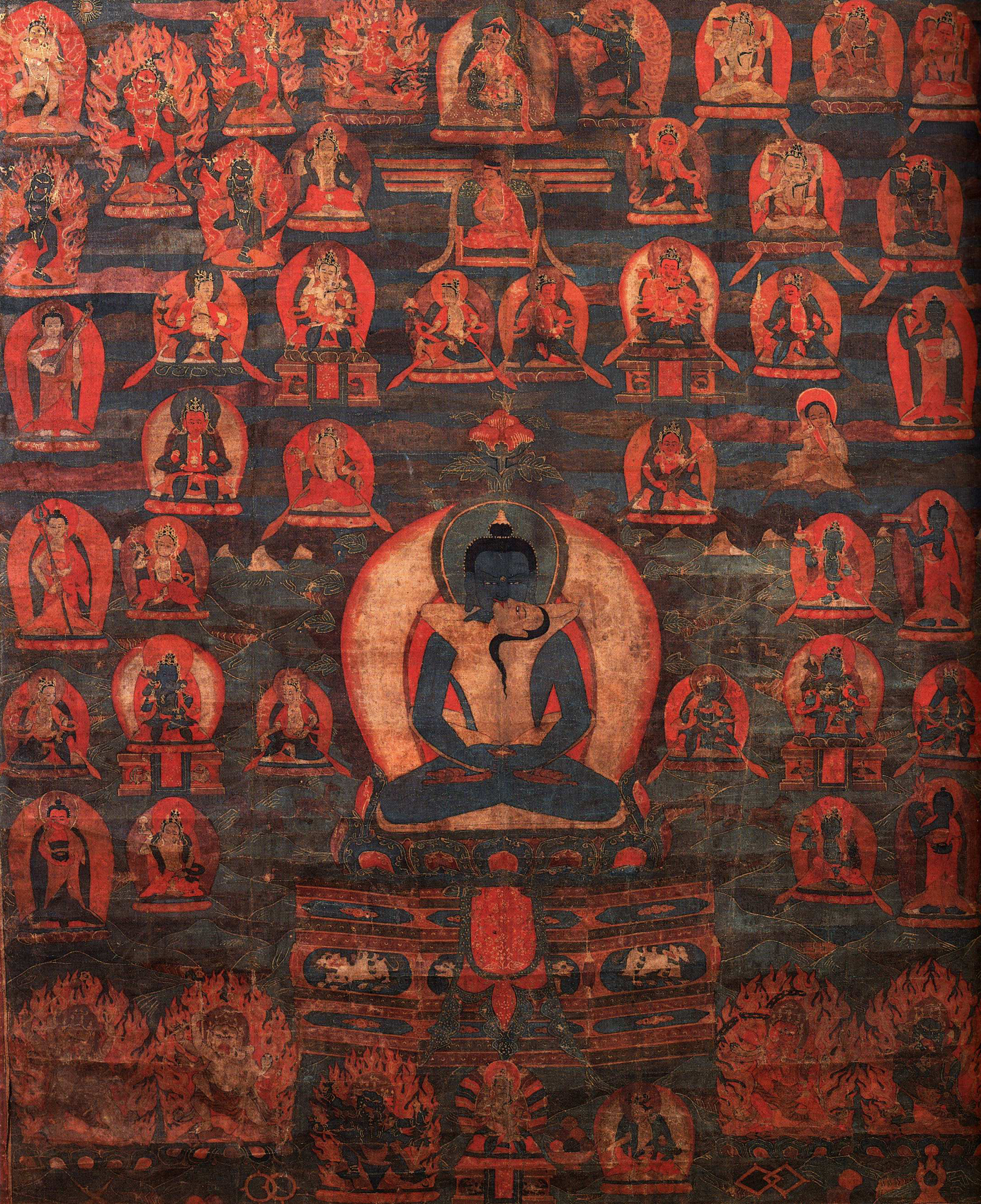
Kuntuzangpo (Samantabhadra), also known as the Kunjed Gyalpo

The Kulayarāja Tantra (Tibetan phonetically: Kunjed Gyalpo, Tibetan: ཀུན་བྱེད་རྒྱལ་པོའི་རྒྱུད་, Wylie: Kun-byed Rgyal-po'i Rgyud; English: "All-Creating King", or "Supreme Source") is a Buddhist Tantra in the Tibetan language and the principal Mind Series (Wylie: sems sde) text of the Dzogchen (Great Perfection) tradition of the Nyingma school. The Kunjed Gyalpo contains within it smaller Dzogchen texts (from the earlier 18 semde texts) such as the Cuckoo of Rigpa (Rig pa'i khu byug) which appears in the thirty first chapter, as such it appears to be a sort of compilation of earlier Dzogchen literature (which is now categorized as "semde").

The Kunjed Gyalpo is the main tantra of the early Great Perfection tradition during the "Era of Fragmentation" (9th–10th centuries) period. As such, it is a key source for the early teachings of Dzogchen, before the developments of the Tibetan renaissance period (11th -12th centuries) transformed Dzogchen into its later (and currently dominant) forms, mainly the Menngagde systems.

The Kunjed Gyalpo is framed as a teaching by the first Buddha, Samantabhadra to Vajrasattva. Samantabhadra is presented as the personification of bodhicitta, the Awakened Mind, the "mind of perfect purity" or "pure perfect presence". The colophon of the text mentions that it was explained by the Indian Śrī Siṃha and translated by Vairotsana.

== Name and structure ==
The full title of the original work in Sanskrit is the Sarvadharma Mahasandhi Bodhichitta Kulayarāja Tantra or alternately Sarvadharma Mahāshānti Bodhicitta Kulayarāja Tantra, where mahāsandhi" (great perfection) is replaced with "mahāshānti" (great peace). In Tibetan (rendered phonetically) it is Chö Tamched Dzogpa Chenpo Changchub Kyi Sem Kunjed Gyalpo. This can be translated "The All-Creating King of Awakened Mind, the Great Perfection of all Things."

According to Namkhai Norbu, Sarvadharma "indicates the totality of phenomena of existence" while Mahasandhi "means that everything is perfect or complete, nothing is lacking." He further states:

Thus the expression sarvadharma mahasandhi signifies that all existence is perfect, complete in all the aspects that we deem good or bad, of both transmigration in samsara and of the liberation of nirvana. In fact, the term "perfect" denotes that everything is included in it, but this should not be understood in the sense that all defects and negativities have been eliminated and only the positive kept. This is not what is meant. True Dzogpa Chenpo is not an object or a text: it is the state of consciousness possessed by each and every individual.

Regarding Bodhicitta (tibetan: changchubsem), Norbu states that it refers to "the original state, the true condition as it is, immutable,"

Chang means purified, or pure, clear and, limpid since the beginning, because there is nothing to purify. Chub means perfected, because even though one may think it is necessary to progress and to improve in order to achieve realization, the state of the individual has been perfect from the very beginning, there is nothing to perfect or to achieve that one does not already have. In general, sem means the mind, but in this case it refers to the state of consciousness, or "nature of mind." Distinguishing between the state of consciousness and the mind is like trying to separate a mirror from its reflection. Or, if we think of the sky, trying to distinguish the blue surface from the clouds that form on it. However, essentially, the true condition is indivisible: the reflection derives from the mirror, which is its sole base, and in the same way, the sky also includes clouds; the clouds themselves are sky. Thus, even though it is said that the mind is produced by dualism and its true condition, the state of consciousness, is beyond dualism, the nature of both is single and indivisible.

Regarding Kulayaraja or Kunjed Gyalpo, Norbu comments:

Raja, or gyalpo, means "king" and kulaya, or kunjed, means the "creator," or "radiator" of all manifestation. Literally it could be rendered "all-creating king" or "creator king." But what does this actually mean? Always and solely it refers to the state of consciousness, regardless whether one calls it Dzogpa Chenpo or bodhicitta. Kunjed Gyalpo thus denotes the primordial state of each individual. Why, then, is it called "creator"? Because all of samsara and nirvana, everything that we consider positive or negative, everything that we differentiate, defining it as good or bad, and so forth, can be compared to a reflection in a mirror. The state of consciousness, on the other hand, is like the condition of the mirror that remains clear and pure without changing. Thus all phenomena arise from the state of consciousness in the same way that reflections appear on the surface of a mirror: hence it is called Kunjed Gyalpo, "the all-creating king."

According to Norbu and Clemente, the text contains 84 chapters divided into three main sections, Longchenpa divided these into the sections shown below:

- The Root Tantra (the first 57 chapters), associated with the wisdom derived from listening. It is meant for practitioners of the highest capacity who attain self-liberation immediately on listening and perceiving the true nature of mind.
  - Ten Chapters on Primordial Manifestation which according to Longchenpa "demonstrate the true condition of the totality of existence (essence, nature, and energy) in the same way that sight is restored to a blind man."
  - Ten Chapters that Disclose the True Nature which according to Longchenpa "demonstrate the perfect condition of the nature of mind as it is, using logical reasoning, examples, and meanings in the same way that a truthful person relates the contents of a letter."
  - Ten Chapters Beyond Cause and Effect which according to Longchenpa "demonstrate that the nature of mind cannot be altered, achieved, or eliminated; it is just like celestial space."
  - Ten Chapters on Perfection Beyond Action which according to Longchenpa "demonstrate that the qualities of self-arising wisdom, that is, of the nature of mind, are already naturally present and self-perfected and that there is no need to seek them. Simply abiding in the state of total relaxation, effortlessly, and without correction or alteration, one achieves realization. Thus, [the true nature] can be compared to the wish-fulfilling jewel."
  - Ten Chapters that Establish Knowledge which according to Longchenpa "smash the huge rocks of erroneous views of the lower vehicles, and at the same time they illuminate the true meaning of the natural state, thus they can be compared to a diamond or to the splendor of the sun."
  - Three Chapters that Summarize the Essence
  - The four chapters that concisely explain the meaning of the words
- The Further Tantra (the following 12), associated with the wisdom derived from reflection. It is meant for practitioners of average capacity who need to reflect. It contains various chapters on understanding the true meaning of the ten natures.
- The Final Tantra (the last 15 chapters), associated with the wisdom derived from meditation. It is meant for practitioners of lower capacity who need to meditate. It contains the teachings on meditation on the true meaning of the ten natures.

== Main themes ==
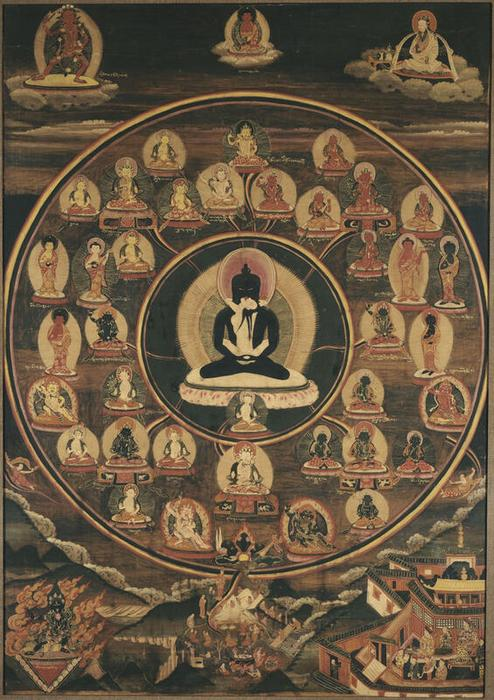
Tibetan Thanka depicting Samantabhadra and various Buddhas and deities, 19th century, Giumet Museum.

According to the Tibetologist David Germano, the Kunjed Gyalpo "is the main canonical work of the Great Perfection as it emerges from the "dark period" (850 to 1000 C. E.) into the light of the economic and religious transformations of the eleventh century. While the dark period was marked by economic depression, political decentralization, and a paucity of historical records, it was thus also apparently the site of these non-institutionalized developments of early Vajrayana movements that resulted in the gradual articulation of a self-conscious Great Perfection movement in Tibet, as well as the more graphically tantric Mahayoga systems."

=== The Supreme Source, Pure Perfect Presence ===
The Kunjed Gyalpo is framed as a dialogue between the "first Buddha" (Adibuddha) known as Kunjed Gyalpo (All-Creating King) or Kuntuzangpo (Skt. Samantabhadra, Always Good) and Sattvavajra (Vajrasattva, "Vajra Being"). According to Jim Valby,

Kunjed Gyalpo and Sattvavajra are not gods, but are symbols for different aspects of our primordial enlightenment. Kunjed Gyalpo is our timeless Pure Perfect Presence beyond cause and effect. Sattvavajra is our ordinary, analytical, judgmental presence inside time that depends upon cause and effect.

The "All-Creating, Pure Perfect Presence" is said to magically display or manifest all phenomena including the five aggregates, five elements, the five bodies (kayas) of the Buddha, the five passions (attachment, anger, pride, ignorance, and jealousy) and five wisdoms, all buddhas of the three times, all sentient beings of the three realms and the animate and inanimate universe. In the tantra, Samantabhadra often states that he ("I") has "created" all of these things, however, as Namkhai Norbu explains, this does not mean there is some being called Samantabhadra that "has concretely done something", instead what it refers to is that all things arise from "the state of consciousness Samantabhadra, the state of dharmakaya."

Furthermore, Samantabhadra states that the 'All-Creating King', is the essence of all things, beings and Buddhas and that to know this Awakened Mind is to attain the essence of Reality. Samantabhadra states that the "All-Creating Sovereign, mind of perfect purity" is the "existential ground (gnas chen) of all Buddhas" as well as the ground, "cause", "stem", and "root" of all things. The Kunjed Gyalpo also states "there is no other Buddha besides me, the All-Creating One," and "all that exists is my own being. The entirety of the animated and inanimated world is my own being."

Thus, all dualistic existence arises from this fundamental pure conscious source. It does not arise at some point in the past, but is always arising from consciousness. To recognize this source, there is no path one needs to follow, one merely needs to recognize that the true nature of the five passions is one's own conscious state, these are the five self-arising wisdoms.

Samantabhadra also states that "the characteristic of the self-originated pristine awareness is indestructibility...the three aspects of my nature are to be known as follows: (1) unborn, (2), without termination, and (3) the source for the wonder of ceaseless creation ... My own-being [svabhava, essence] is the sole reality."

The ultimate awakened reality is also described as 'pure and total consciousness'. It is presented as a fundamental essential substance, not engendered by causes and conditions. It is a true essence that is possessed of self-arisen wisdom that governs all things, both animate and inanimate, and which bestows life on all.

The essence of the Supreme Source is described by Samantabhadra as follows:

My essence is non-conceptual and indivisible. This abode of dharmadhatu was created by me, but still does not abide as something other than the state of Pure Perfect (Presence). Unobscured and all-pervading, my essence is the palace of wisdom, luminous space. Nothing exists other than the state of self-originated wisdom. Because I am the Source from which everything manifests, the five great elements and the six lokas in the three realms are not other than my Body, Voice, and Mind. In this way I manifest my essence. The buddhas of the three times and sentient beings of the three realms display my essence to you. Because my essence is unborn and transcends concepts, it is non-abiding and it transcends all objects of experience. It does not appear and it transcends the realm of cultivating contemplation.

=== Atiyoga and the nine vehicles ===
This text also states that there are ultimately nine vehicles to liberation, all of which arise from the same primordial state or supreme source. Liberation is when a being recognizes their own bodhicitta (mind of awakening) or mind of perfect purity. The nine vehicles are "the three sutric vehicles of the sravakas, pratyekabuddhas, and Bodhisattvas; the three outer tantric vehicles, kriya, ubhaya, and yoga (which are sometimes grouped into one vehicle: sattvayoga); and the three inner tantric vehicles, mahayoga, anuyoga, and atiyoga." The highest and supreme vehicle to liberation is Atiyoga (Utmost or Transcendent Yoga, i.e. Dzogchen, "Great Perfection"), which is an "effortless path of the recognition of pure non-dual presence" that is unencumbered by the elements of the other lower vehicles.

The core of the Dzogchen view is based on the definitive view of self-perfection, which holds that "the fruit of enlightenment is already perfected and is not something to construct through effort because it has existed from the very beginning." All the other vehicles are said to work with the provisional teaching (i.e. conventional, not ultimate) related to cause and effect and thus they do not understand the true meaning.

Nevertheless, it is stated in chapter 10 that a Dzogchen practitioner must be aware of all the teachings of the lower vehicles and know how to use them. This is because, as Norbu states, "any method can prove useful as long as it is practiced in the spirit of Dzogchen." Also, according to Norbu, even though the meditations of the lower vehicles remain at the dualistic level, "by means of these methods we can gradually attain the state beyond dualism."

Furthermore, according to the Kunjed Gyalpo, the Atiyoga/Dzogchen vehicle is different than tantric vehicles because while tantric practice is based on ten fundamental points, called the "ten natures of Tantra", Dzogchen instead is based "ten absences" (med pa bcu):

1. There is no view on which one has to meditate.
2. There is no commitment, or samaya, one has to keep.
3. There is no capacity for spiritual action one has to seek.
4. There is no mandala one has to create.
5. There is no initiation one has to receive.
6. There is no path one has to tread.
7. There are no levels of realization (bhumis) one has to achieve through purification.
8. There is no conduct one has to adopt, or abandon.
9. From the beginning, self-arising wisdom has been free of obstacles.
10. Self-perfection is beyond hope and fear.

These ten points are a key topic of this tantra, and are "repeated and explained from various angles in different parts of the book and constitute the fundamental feature that distinguishes Dzogchen from the other paths of realization, which are all, to a greater or lesser degree, bound to the notion of cause and effect." According to Namkhai Norbu, these ten classic points of tantra are absent in Dzogchen because "they are ways of correcting or altering the true nature of the individual, but in reality there is nothing to change or to improve, all that is necessary is to discover the real condition and to remain relaxed in that state."

When the topics of tantra are taken up, they are re-interpreted from the perspective of Dzogchen. For example, the teacher or guru in Dzogchen ultimately refers to what manifests from within our real condition and not to someone outside of oneself. Likewise, samaya (tantric commitments or vows) in Dzogchen does not refer to any particular rules one has to observe, rather it is "when, in daily life, one remains in the natural state, abiding in awareness and presence."

=== Meditation ===
As noted by Sam van Schaik, in the Kunjed Gyalpo "one finds a rejection of the elaborate imagery and practices" of the Mahayoga (Anuttarayoga) tantras. Namkhai Norbu explains how Dzogchen, being its own vehicle, does not rely on the means of the path of transformation (i.e. tantra, Vajrayana):

The fundamental point of the practice of Dzogchen, called tregchod or "release of tension," is to relax in the state of contemplation, while the way to remain in this state is called chogshag, "leaving as it is." Doing a visualization, a practice of transformation of impure vision into a mandala etc., means "constructing" something, working with the mind, whereas in the state of contemplation, body, voice, and mind are totally relaxed, and it must indispensably be this way. A term used very frequently in Dzogchen is machopa, "not corrected," or "not altered," whereas transformation means correcting, considering that there is impure vision on one side and pure vision on the other. Thus, all that is necessary to enter into the state of contemplation is to relax, and there is no need of any transformation practice. Some people believe that Dzogchen is only the final phase of tantric practice, rather like the Mahamudra of the modern tradition, but this is because the arrival point of the path of anuyoga, too, is called Dzogchen. In reality, Dzogchen atiyoga is a path complete in itself, and, as already mentioned above, is not dependent on the-methods-of the path of transformation.

Chapter 29 of the Kunjed Gyalpo contains an important series of verses on the practice of tregchod: "Do not correct your body, Do not meditate on the deity, Do not correct your voice, Do not concentrate or visualize, Do not correct the mind (rang lu ma cho Iha ma gom, mawai tsigtang ngag ma cho, tingdzin ma Jed sem ma cho)." This refers to not adopting any specific posture (just relaxing), not to visualize a deity, recite mantras or practice breath exercises, and not to focus the mind on anything in particular. Instead, the Kunjed Gyalpo states: "You need only discover what is, without correcting or seeking to construct something new. Unless you attain knowledge of the authentic condition you will never liberate yourself."

Chapter 31 contains the six vajra verses of the Cuckoo of Rigpa, which encapsulates the Dzogchen perspective on meditation as follows:

The nature of the variety of phenomena is non-dual,
Yet each phenomena is beyond the limits of the mind.
The authentic condition as it is does not become a concept,
Yet it manifests totally in form, always good.
All being already perfect, overcome the sickness of effort
And remain naturally in self-perfection: this is contemplation.

== Commentaries ==
Longchenpa (Wylie: kLong chen rab 'byams pa, 1308–1364) wrote a commentary on this tantra entitled: The Jewel Ship: A Guide to the Meaning of the Supreme Ordering Principle in the Universe, the State of Pure and Total Presence (byang chub kyi sems kun byed rgyal po'i don khrid rin chen sgru bo). This was translated into English by Lipman & Peterson (1987) in "You Are the Eyes of the World".

According to David Germano, Longchenpa outlines the following contemplative system in his commentary on the Kunjed Gyalpo:

The description is divided up into the traditional triad of a contemplation session: the preliminaries (here identified as guru yoga), the main practice and the concluding practices (here specified as techniques for sustaining the visions and experiences). The guru yoga begins with simple visualizations of a syllable emanating light rays, continues with self-visualization as the deity Sems dpa' rdo rjey, a visualization of an image of the guru upon your head, and further visualizations of surrounding lineage masters and so forth. In addition, you utilize a special breathing technique called "vajra repetition" (rdo rje'i bzlos)—you pronounce Om as you inhale, ah as you hold the breath momentarily, and hum as you exhale. This practice is a quite standard tantric contemplation, but it is important to note this is introduced as a preliminary which serves to contextualize the main practice, which would be the Great Perfection proper.

The main practice involves four subdivisions: determining (the ground) through the appropriate view, finalizing through contemplative cultivation (of this view); clearing away treacherous pathways through your conduct; and divesting yourself from all hopes and fears as the fruit. The view section involves exclusively poetic / analytic thematic meditative inquiry or reverie, though the two references to how many days should be spent on it clearly indicate that formal meditative sessions are indicated. The contemplation, conduct and fruit sections begin with relaxing in the seven point lotus posture, but are in fact in their entirety "technique-free" yet highly experiential scripts for working with one's own psyche.

The concluding phase provides some simple practical techniques for coping with various situations. As strategies for dealing with obstacles to one's meditative practice, kLong chen rab 'byams pa advocates traditional Buddhist techniques such as supplicating one's Master, trusting in pure vision, cultivating love and compassion, and training one's mind to be constantly aware of karmic consequences of one's actions as well as impermanence. While other solutions are again more cognitive in nature, he offers specific advice for feelings of drowsiness and distraction towards objects—"stick to a cool room with a high seat, exert yourself and do physical exercises." He also reiterates the importance of stabilizing concentration on an objective reference, the precise content of which is not relevant, followed by a clear explication of how such stabilization is utilized. The beginning level of such practice involves the achievement of a calm, collected state of mind, which, however, is periodically interrupted by the movement of thought (sems gnas thog nas 'phro). The intermediate level of familiarization with such contemplation is reached when one begins to gain the ability to find such calm amidst the movement of thought ('phro thog na gnas). The advanced level is when calmness and thoughts manifest with-out any duality or fissure (gnas 'phro gnyis med du shar ba).

Khenpo Thubten Pema Rabgye (19th century) wrote a longer commentary, the Ornament of the State of Samantabhadra: Commentary on The All-Creating King, Pure Perfect Presence, Great Perfection of All Phenomena. It has been translated by Jim Valby in six volumes.

The modern Dzogchen teacher Chogyal Namkhai Norbu has given an oral commentary, which can be found in The Supreme Source, The Fundamental Tantra of Dzogchen Semde, Kunjed Gyalpo (1999).

== See also ==
- Adi-Buddha
- Anunatva-Apurnatva-Nirdesa
- Buddha-nature
- Creator in Buddhism
- Immanence
- Mahāyāna Mahāparinirvāṇa Sūtra
- Panentheism
- Śūnyatā
- Śrīmālādevī Siṃhanāda Sūtra
- Tathāgatagarbha Sūtra
