= 3rd Karmapa, Rangjung Dorje =

Karmapa of Kagyu Tibetan Buddhism (1284–1339)

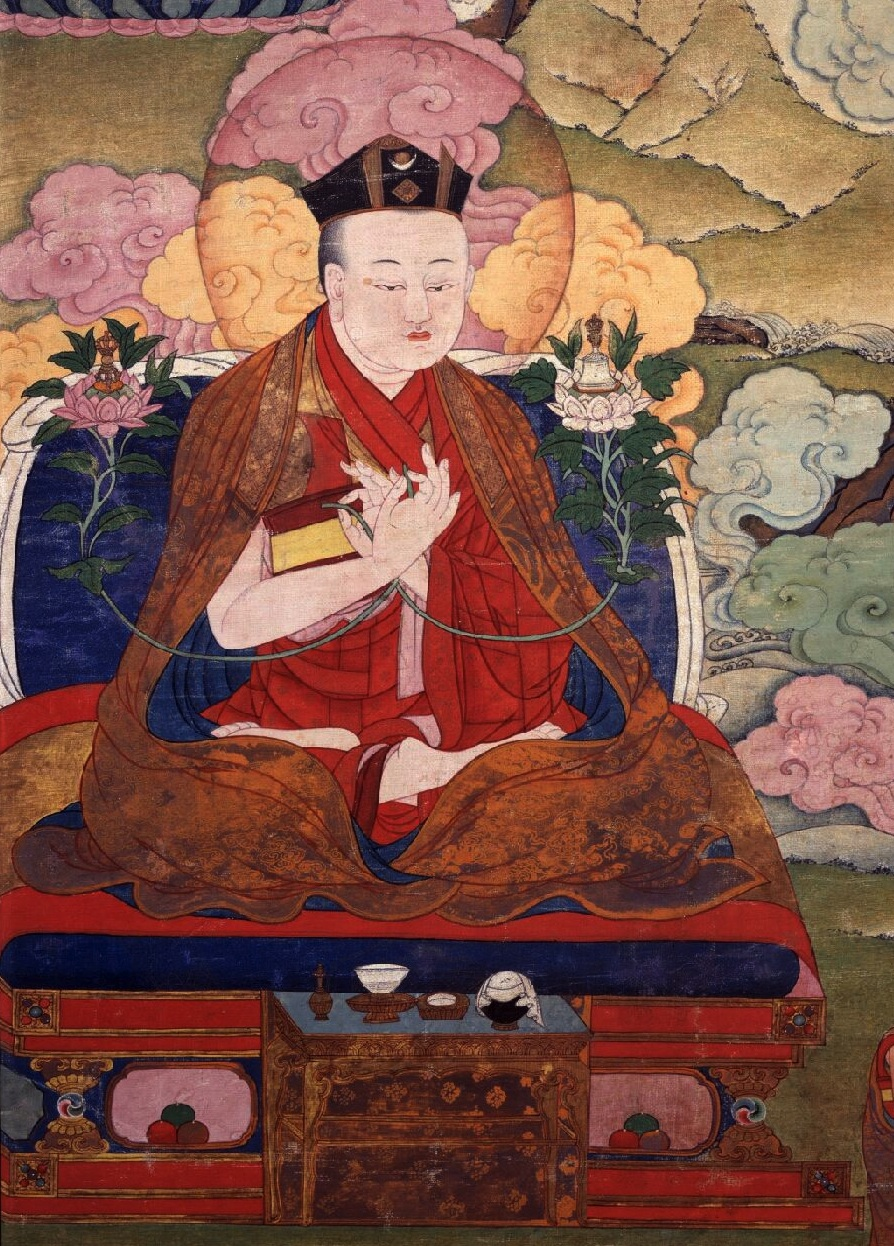
The 3rd Karmapa, Rangjung Dorje (1284–1339)

The 3rd Karmapa, Rangjung Dorje (Tibetan: རང་འབྱུང་རྡོ་རྗེ་, Wylie: rang 'byung rdo rje) (1284–1339) was the 3rd Gyalwa Karmapa and head of the Karma Kagyu school, the largest school within the Kagyu tradition. He was an important figure in the history of Tibetan Buddhism, who helped to spread Buddha-nature teachings in Tibet.

== Biography ==
Rangjung Dorjé was officially recognized as the first tulku, the reincarnation of Karma Pakshi, in 1282. The 3rd Karmapa was raised at the Tsurphu Monastery, where he received teachings from both the Kagyu and Nyingma traditions from eminent masters such as Trophu Künden Sherab and Nyenre Gendün Bum. He became renowned as one of the greatest masters of his time and had a large number of disciples. He undertook a spiritual retreat on the slopes of Everest, received full ordination, and completed his studies at a significant Kadampa teaching center.

Rangjung Dorje visited China, where the emperor Toghon Temur became his disciple. Upon his death, Rangjung Dorje's face is said to have appeared in the moon there. As a tulku lineage, the Karmapas were among the earliest recognized Tulkus, reincarnated as deities. The first Karmapas were influential in the Mongolian Yuan and Chinese Ming courts as well as the Tangut Western Xia Kingdom. (Note: Tom Suchan: "The first several Karmapas are distinguished by their important status at the Yuan and Ming courts of China where they served as the spiritual guides to princes and emperors. Their influence also extended to the court of the Tangut Xia Kingdom where a disciple of Dusum Khyenpa was given the title "Supreme Teacher" by a Tangut Xixia King...")

Through visions, he is believed to have received teachings on the "Wheel of Time", the Kalachakra. In 1284 he authored an astrological compendium entitled The Compendium of Astrology (Tib. rtsis kun bsdus pa), from which a Tibetan calendar was developed by the lineage of the Gyalwang Karmapas. Called the Tsurphu tradition calendar or the Tsurluk calendar, his astrological compendium was the basis from which many treatises authored by the subsequent Karmapas and by Jamgon Kongtrul the Great evolved. The Tsurluk calendar is still used by the Karma Kagyu and overseen by Tsipa Gelek Dhargay, at the 17th Karmapa, Ogyen Trinley Dorje's seat in Rumtek, Sikkim, India.

Rangjung Dorje was also known as a great practitioner of Traditional Tibetan medicine.

== Lineage ==
Born to a Nyingma family, Rangjung Dorje was a lineage-holder in both the Karma Kagyu and the Nyingma tradition of Dzogchen.

He was a disciple of the Nyingma master Rigdzin Kumaradza Shönnu Gyelpo (Tibetan: rig 'dzin ku ma ra dza gzhon nu rgyal po; 1266–1343) who passed on to him the "heart-essence" (nying-thig) teachings transmitted by Padmasambhava (Note: The Khandro Nyingtik) and Vimalamitra (the Khandro Nyingtik and Vima Nyingtik respectively).

He also encountered the Nyingma master Longchenpa, who transmitted to him certain Dzogchen teachings. In exchange, Rangjung Dorje imparted important "New Translation" Tantras to Longchenpa. Rangjung Dorje was also a "Treasure revealer" of termas. The Karma Kagyu Dzogchen transmission that arose from his lineage is known as the "Karma-Nyingthig" (Tibetan: kar ma snying thig; Essence of the Heart of the Karma School).

== Teachings and influence ==
=== Buddha-nature and shentong ===
In 1321 the famous scholar Dolpopa (1292–1361) visited Tsurphu Monastery for the first time and had extensive discussions with Rangjung Dorje about doctrinal issues. It appears that Rangjung Dorje almost certainly influenced the development of some of Dolpopa's theories, possibly including his Zhentong (gzhan stong) method.

According to Karma phrin las, Dri lan yid, 91-92, his teacher, Chödrak Gyatso, the Seventh Karmapa, interpreted the nature of Zhentong (gzhan stong) accepted by Rangjung Dorje.

=== Chod ===
Schaeffer (1995: p. 15) conveys that the Third Karmapa was a systematizer of the Chöd developed by Machig Labdrön and lists a number of his works on Chod consisting of redactions, outlines and commentaries. (Note: Schaeffer: "Rang byung was renowned as a systematizer of the Gcod teachings developed by Ma gcig lab sgron. His texts on Gcod include the Gcod kyi khrid yig; the Gcod bka' tshoms chen mo'i sa bcad which consists of a topical outline of and commentary on Ma gcig lab sgron's Shes rab kyi pha rol tu phyin pa zab mo gcod kyi man ngag gi gzhung bka' tshoms chen mo ; the Tshogs las yon tan kun 'byung ; the lengthy Gcod kyi tshogs las rin po che'i phrenb ba 'don bsgrigs bltas chog tu bdod pa gcod kyi lugs sor bzhag; the Ma lab sgron la gsol ba 'deb pa'i mgur ma; the Zab mo bdud kyi gcod yil kyi khrid yig, and finally the Gcod kyi nyams len.)

=== Dzogchen ===
Yungtön Dorjepel (1284–1365), (the previous incarnation of the First Panchen Lama, Khedrup Je), studied the Great Perfection due to the great inspiration of Rangjung Dorje.

== Writings ==
Rangjung Dorje was a noted scholar who composed many significant texts, the most famous of which is the Profound Inner Meaning (Wylie: zab mo nang don), which concern the Vajrayana inner yoga practices. Other important texts of his include:

- The Aspiration Prayer of Mahamudra (Wylie: nge don phyag rgya chen po'i smon lam gyi 'grel pa grub pa mchog gi zhal lung),
- The Prayer to the Lineage of Chö,
- The thirty-six verse doha song: Distinguishing Consciousness from Wisdom (Wylie: rnam shes ye shes ‘byed pa),
- Instructions on Sahaja yoga Mahamudra ,
- A Treatise on Buddha Nature (Wylie: de bzhin gshegs pa'i snying po gtan la dbab pa; or, de bzhin gshegs pa'i snying po bstan pa).

== Sources ==
- Lama Kunsang, Lama Pemo, Marie Aubèle (2012). History of the Karmapas: The Odyssey of the Tibetan Masters with the Black Crown. Snow Lion Publications, Ithaca, New York. ISBN 1-55939-390-4.
- Thinley, Karma (2008). The History of Sixteen Karmapas of Tibet. USA: Prajna Press. p. 150. ISBN 978-1-57062-644-9.

Preceded by Karma Pakshi	Reincarnation of the Karmapa	Succeeded by Rolpe Dorje
