= The Profound Inner Principles =

14th century treatise by Rangjung Dorje

The Profound Inner Principles also known as Profound Inner Meaning or 'Zabmo Nangdon' (Tibetan: ཟབ་མོ་ནང་དོན, Wylie: zab mo nang don) is a 14th-century treatise and major work of Rangjung Dorje (Tibetan: རང་འབྱུང་རྡོ་རྗེ, Wylie: rang 'byung rdo rje) (1284–1339), the third Karmapa, born to a Nyingma family he received the full transmission of the Nyingma tradition, in addition to the Karma Kagyu.

== Nomenclature, orthography and etymology ==
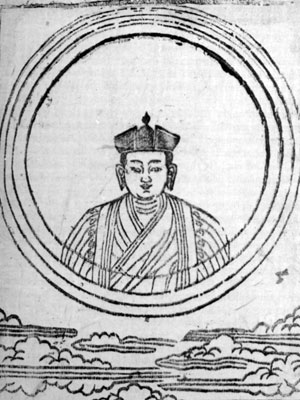
Rangjung Dorje, (1284–1339)

'Rangjung Dorje' (Tibetan: རང་འབྱུང་རྡོ་རྗེ, Wylie: rang 'byung rdo rje)

== Exegesis ==
Rangjung Dorje was a noted scholar who composed many significant texts, the most famous of which is the Profound Inner Meaning (Wylie: zab mo nang don), which concern the Vajrayana inner yoga practices.

== Translation ==
The text and its commentary by Jamgon Kongtrul Lodro Thaye has been translated in English by Elizabeth M. Callahan. It was published in 2013 by Shambhala Publications.

== Structure ==
=== Summary ===
The first chapter covers the 'causes' (Sanskrit: hetu) and 'conditions' (Sanskrit: pratyaya) for Samsara and Nirvana. The second chapter discusses the esoteric understanding of the development of the body in the womb which has direct relevance to the Generation stage. The text then discusses Nadis, the five 'winds' Prana/Vayu (Sanskrit) and 'breathwork' (Sanskrit: pranayama) and the 'Four States' which are stages of the Generation Phase. Correspondence between 'inner' and 'outer' which broaches nonduality and the Two truths. 'Imputed deities' which discusses the yoga of the 'illusory body', yidam and emanation bodies. 'Bases' discusses the Eighteen Dhatu and Upaya. Ten, discusses Bhumi and Lamrim. Chapter eleven closes with Completion stage.

=== Chapters ===
The Tsadra Foundation (2008) lists the following chapters in the Profound Inner Meaning, also rendered into English:

- Introduction
- One: The Causes and Conditions for Saṃsāra and Nirvāṇa
- Two: Development of Body in Womb
- Three: Nāḍīs
- Four: Prāṇas
- Five: Bindus
- Six: The Four States
- Seven: Correspondence between Inner and Outer
- Eight: Imputed Deities
- Nine: Bases and Means of Purification
- Ten: Stages of the Path
- Eleven: Dissolution
- Conclusion: Vidyādhara piṭaka

== Commentary ==
Jamgon Kongtrul did a commentary on the text which has been given the English gloss 'Illuminating the Profound Meaning: a Commentary to The Profound Inner Meaning (Zabdon Nangjey)'.

== Editions ==
- Karmapa III, Rangjung Dorje. zab mo nang gi don zhes bya ba'i gzhung and rnal 'byor bla med pa'i rgyud sde rgya mtsho'i snying po bsdus pa zab mo nang gi don nyung ngu'i tshig gis rnam par 'grol ba zab don snang byed. (The Profound Inner Meaning.) Rumtek, Sikkim: Karmapa'i chos sgar, n.d.

== See also ==
- Tibetan Buddhist canon
- Yana—a guide to the various classifications of the Buddhist schools into "yanas" or "vehicles".
