= 2nd Karmapa, Karma Pakshi =

Karmapa of Kagyu Tibetan Buddhism (1204/6–1283)

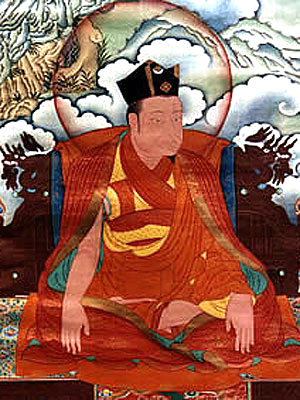
The 2nd Karmapa, Karma Pakshi (1204/6–1283)

The 2nd Karmapa, Karma Pakshi (Tibetan: ཀརྨ་པཀྴི་, Wylie: kar ma pak shi; 1204/06–1283) was the 2nd Gyalwa Karmapa. He was a child prodigy who had already acquired a broad understanding of Dharma philosophy and meditation by the age of ten. His teacher, Pomdrakpa, had received the full Kagyu transmission from Drogon Rechen, the 1st Karmapa's spiritual heir. Pomdrakpa realized, through certain very clear visions, that the child in his charge was the reincarnation of Dusum Khyenpa, as also indicated in a letter given to Drogon Rechen.

The young Karma Pakshi is said to have assimilated the deepest teachings effortlessly and required only one reading of a text to be familiar with it as he was already enlightened. Nevertheless, Pomdrakpa made a point of formally passing on all the teachings through the traditional empowerments, so that the stream of the empowerment lineage would be unbroken. This has been the case ever since: despite their innate clarity, young Karmapas receive all the transmissions formally.

The 2nd Karmapa spent much of the first half of his life in meditation retreat. He also visited and restored the monasteries established by the first Karmapa and is famous for having introduced to the Tibetan people communal chanting of the Om mani padme hum mantra of compassion.

In his fifties, Karma Pakshi set out on a three-year journey to China, in response to an invitation from Kublai, grandson of Genghis Khan. While at Kublai Khan's court, he is said to have performed many spectacular miracles and played an important role as a peacemaker. Although requested to reside there permanently, he declined, not wishing to be the cause of sectarian conflicts with the Sakyapas, whose influence was strong in China at that time. (There is a claimed independent western reference to his presence in the court of Kublai Khan in The Travels of Marco Polo, but Marco Polo did not arrive in China until 1275). Over the next ten years the Karmapa travelled widely in China, Mongolia, and Tibet and became famous as a teacher. He was particularly honoured by Möngke Khan, Kublai's brother, who ruled the Mongol Empire at that time and whom the 2nd Karmapa recognised as a former disciple. After Mönke's death, Kublai became the Khan. He established the city of Cambalu, the site of present-day Beijing, from which he ruled a vast empire stretching as far as Burma, Korea, and Tibet. However, he bore a grudge against the Karmapa, who had refused his invitation to remain in the Khan's empire several years before and he had been close to the Khan's brother. Kublai Khan ordered the Karmapa's arrest.

Some sources state that each attempt to capture, or even kill, the Karmapa was thwarted by the latter's miracles. At one point the 2nd Karmapa 'froze' a battalion of 37,000 soldiers on the spot, by using the power of mudra, yet all the time showing compassion. He eventually let himself be captured and put in exile, knowing that his miracles and compassion would eventually lead to the Kublai Khan having a change of heart, which did in fact happen.

Returning to Tibet towards the end of his life, the 2nd Karmapa had an enormous sixteen-meter statue of the Gautama Buddha built at Tsurphu Monastery, to fulfill a dream he had had near Kucha on his travels on the Silk Road. The finished work was slightly tilted; it is said that Karma Pakshi straightened it by sitting first in the same tilted posture as the statue and then righting himself. The statue moved as he moved. Before dying, he told his main disciple, Urgyenpa, details concerning the next Karmapa's birth.

This text is based on the abstract from Ken Holmes book Karmapa on the web site used with the author's permission.

== External resource ==
- An Introduction to the Life of Karma Pakshi (1204/6-1283), by Charles Manson, Bodleian Library Tibetan subject consultant librarian. Bulletin of Tibetology
- Sorensen, Michelle (April 2011). "The Second Karmapa, Karma Pakshi". The Treasury of Lives: Biographies of Himalayan Religious Masters.
- "The Second Karmapa, Karma Pakshi: Tibetan Mahasiddha" by Charles Manson.

Recording at Library of Congress, Washington DC, of Charles Manson on "Karma Pakshi and Two Mongol Emperors: Genesis of the Reincarnate Lamas Tradition". Recorded 11 January 2023.

Preceded by Düsum Khyenpa	Reincarnation of the Karmapa	Succeeded by Rangjung Dorje
