= Trilogy of Natural Ease =

Dzogchen book trilogy

The Trilogy of Finding Comfort and Ease (ngal gso skor gsum, Sanskrit Mahāsaṃdhi viśrānta trayāya nāma, literally "The Trilogy called Reposing (viśrānta) in the Great Perfection") is a trilogy of Dzogchen writings by Longchen Rabjam:

- Finding Comfort and Ease in the Nature of Mind (sems nyid ngal gso). In Sanskrit ("the language of India"): Mahāsaṃdhi cittatva* viśrānta nāma: [A Teaching] named Reposing (viśrānta) in the Suchness of Mind in the Great Perfection
- Finding Comfort and Ease in Meditation (bsam gtan ngal gso). In the language of India: Mahāsaṃdhi dhyāna viśrānta nāma: [A Teaching] named Reposing in Meditation on the Great Perfection
- Finding Comfort and Ease in the Illusoriness of Things (Tib. སྒྱུ་མ་ངལ་གསོ་, Wyl. sgyu ma ngal gso), also called in Sanskrit: Mahāsaṃdhi māyā viśrānta nāma.

== Intent of the Trilogy, and the logic of their sequence ==
Regarding the intent of the Trilogy as a whole, Jigme Khyentse Rinpoche, in the introduction to Finding Rest in the Nature of Mind, comments:

At the conclusion of the great autocommentary (The Great Chariot) to his long and beautiful poem Finding Rest in the Nature of the Mind, Gyalwa Longchenpa gave the reason for his massive composition. He began by lamenting the fact that the great masters of the past, whose works were clear, comprehensive, and utterly trustworthy, had passed away. Their place had been taken by scholars of incomplete learning and understanding...
It was to correct this misunderstanding that Longchenpa composed his Trilogy of Rest and in particular its first section, Finding Rest in the Nature of the Mind, which is an exposition of the stages of the path. Here, the sūtras and tantras are explained progressively—from the preliminary reflections that cause the mind to take an interest in spiritual values, to the view and practice of the Great Perfection—in order to show how the earlier teachings are enlarged and completed by those that follow.

Padmakara Translation Group comments:

Longchenpa generally adopted two methods of discourse in relation to the teachings of the Great Perfection: the extensive, expository method of the paṇḍitas, and the profound and direct method of pith instructions intended for yogis engaged in the practice. The former approach is abundantly exemplified in the Seven Treasures, while the latter is the chosen method for the three quintessential commentaries in the Four Parts of Nyingthig.
These two methods are combined in the Trilogy of Rest... Longchenpa says in his general outline, An Ocean of Elegant Explanations, “These three works show unerringly (a) the ground that is the view, (b) the path that is the meditation, and (c) the associated conduct that is their ancillary.”

Longchenpa's commentary on the trilogy as a whole, entitled An Ocean of Fine Explanation: An Overview of the Trilogy of Comfort and Ease (ngal gso skor gsum gyi spyi don Legs bshad rgya mtsho) says:

- In the beginning, when we first set out on the path, it is important that we establish a good foundation in the Dharma, and that is why the thirteen chapters of Finding Comfort and Ease in the Nature of Mind, from the difficulty of finding the freedoms and advantage onwards, offer an elaborate explanation of the Ground, the view that is beyond the two extremes. At the same time, they also explain aspects of the stages of the path and fruition.
- Once we have understood the ground, we can begin to meditate on the path, and so the four chapters of Finding Comfort and Ease in Meditation offer a step-by-step explanation of the places where meditation can be practised, the types of individual suited to the practice, the techniques we can use in meditation and the types of concentration that can be achieved.
- While this path is being practised it is important to have teachings on non-attachment and non-clinging towards phenomena. Thus, as a support, a clear and elaborate presentation of the stages of conduct is given in the eight chapters of Finding Comfort and Ease in the Illusoriness of Things. These chapters reveal, thoroughly and without any error, how to relate to all phenomena and to experience them as the eight similes of illusoriness.

== English translations ==
=== The root text ===
The three parts translated in

- Padmakara Translation Group, The Trilogy of Rest. Boulder, Colorado: Shambhala Publications.
  - Finding Rest in the Nature of the Mind (2017) ISBN 978-1-61180-516-1
  - Finding Rest in Meditation (2018) ISBN 978-1-61180-552-9
  - Finding Rest in Illusion (2018) ISBN 978-1-61180-592-5

Volume One also translates passages from Longchenpa's autocommentary to Part One; each of Volume Two and Volume Three contains the whole of Longchenpa's respective autocommentary to Part Two and to Part Three.

- Guenther, Herbert V., Kindly Bent to Ease Us. Berkeley, California: Dharma Publishing.
  - Kindly Bent to Ease Us, Part One: Mind (1975) ISBN 0-913546-40-2
  - Kindly Bent to Ease Us, Part Two: Meditation (1976) ISBN 0-913546-43-7
  - Kindly Bent to Ease Us, Part Three: Wonderment (1976) ISBN 0-913546-45-3

Guenther makes reference to Longchenpa's autocommentaries in his introductions to the chapters and in his notes.

His distinctive rendering of the trilogy's title is borrowed from Jonathan Swift's Verses on the Death of Dr. Swift, D.S.P.D.: "[. . .] This maxim more than all the rest / Is thought too base for human breast: / 'In all distresses of our friends, / We first consult our private ends; / While Nature, kindly bent to ease us, / Points out some circumstance to please us.'" (written November 1731; published 1739)

Part Two (bsam gtan ngal gso) is also translated in

- Dalai Lama, Mind in Comfort and Ease: The Vision of Enlightenment in the Great Perfection. Wisdom Publications, 2007.

Part Three (sgyu ma ngal gso) is also translated in

- Dowman, Keith, Maya Yoga: Longchenpa's Finding Comfort and Ease in Enchantment. Vajra Publications, 2010.
