= Rigdzin Kumaradza =

Dzogchen master (1266–1343)

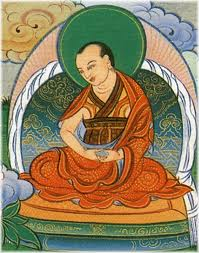
Rigdzin Kumaradza, an important figure in the Seminal Heart tradition of the renaissance period.

Rigdzin Kumaradza (1266–1343) was a Dzogchen master in the lineage of the Vima Nyingthig.

== Nomenclature, orthography and etymology ==
Kumārarāja, Kumārāja and Kumaraja (Sanskrit) is sometimes also orthographically represented as Kumārarādza and Kumārādza.

== Overview ==
Kumaradza was a Tibetan yogic mendicant famous for his austere nomadic lifestyle and deep flow meditation styles. Nomadic in orientation and obscure in siddhi, he was renowned as genuine realizer of Vajrayana Buddhist luminous clarity. Kumaradza's esoteric processes reflected a kindly though abrupt and forceful demeanor. There are accounts of how some of his students were meditating in mere animal skin shelters as quasi-impromptu protection against ferocious high desert winds. These small camps subsisted on scant donations. The focus of his practices concentrated on secret cognizance yogas of "naked awareness" or "natural mind" (rigpa).

His purview of existence was powerful, particularly in how he applied his consciousness to matters at hand. He was considered one of the realized masters of his day. His processes and teachings were stringent for most beings to undertake due to his rigorous approaches and dogged regimens.

He stolidly adhered to tenets of Dzogpa Chenpo methods of enlightening awareness. And he was also versed in Maha Mudra processings of liberation from "afflictions" and "obscurations" kleshas of mind. He was likely familiar with Maha Madyamika and various intellectual traditions of meditational development current in those Himalayan regions. But recountings indicate he must have preferred Dzog Chen or some combination of Dzog Chen and Maha Mudra.

Kumaradza's name can be recognized and translated as an epithet for Vajra Kilaiya or Dorje Phurbu, one of the chief protectors of Nyingmapas and important to Sakyapa and Kahjyupa schools. Rikzin Kumaradza could be said to mean "Rigpa Holder Of Kilaiya Regency", or "Awakened Ruler Of Royal Purba", or "Awareness Master King Of Tri-Dagger". Implication being, that Kumaradza is accomplished in realization and liberation and enlightening for beings of the three worlds of past and present and future, as well desire realms and form ranges and formless zones, and also could be interpreted as glowing with Dharmakaya, Sambhogakaya and Nirmanakaya eyes.

== Instructor ==
Kumaradza was a senior disciple of Melong Dorje (1243–1303). Kumaradza studied with the grand master Orgyenpa (1230–1309), who conveyed teachings of 'Vimalamitra's Seminal Heart' (Tibetan: བི་མ་སྙིང་ཐིག་, Wylie: bi ma snying thig) upon him.

== Successor ==
Kumararaja transmitted the complete set of all the Nyingthig teachings he held upon Longchen Rabjam who became his 'heart son', principal disciple and lineage successor.

Dudjom (1904–1987) et al. (1991: p. 579) hold that just prior to the arrival of Longchenpa, Kumaraja relates to his disciples:

"Last night I dreamt that a wonderful bird, which announced itself to be a divine bird, came with a large flock in attendance, and carried away my books in all directions. Therefore, someone will come to hold my lineage."

Kumaraja accepted no outer tribute from Lonchenpa for the teachings he received as Kumararaja through his supernormal cognitive powers discerned that Longchenpa was blameless and had offered his tribute internally.

Rigdzin Kumaradza is credited as the seminal instructor for both Longchen Rabjampa and the Third Karmapa, Rangjyung Dorjy. Kumaradza held the teachings of the 'Innermost Spirituality' (bi ma snying thig) which gave both Lonchenpa and Rangjyungla the impetus to become his disciples and endure the significantly deprived lifestyle. Kumaradza was crucial in drawing out Longchenpa's and Rangjyung Dorjy's ideas and ineterests, especially while collecting and compiling texts relevant to profound awakening. Both Longchen and Rangjyung are revered, studied, and cited as great writers and thinkers. Gompas, monasteries, nunneries, and centres of meditation, scattered around the world, practice their related techniques and yogas of devotion on daily basis. Kumaradza has slowly become a more prominent figure in Tibetan spiritual lore as knowledge of it spreads internationally, and more translations have remarked on his influences.

The Longchen Nyingtik tradition of the Nyingma school as revealed by Jikmey Lingpa, who flourished in the seventeen hundreds, is through Longchenpa greatly indebted to Kumaradza. The Karma Kamtsang branch, as well as others of the Kahjyupa school, are additionally beholden and certainly enhanced via Rangjyung Dorjy's potent songs and dohas and meditation pujas where Kumaradza's spacious mind flow is evident in fine resonance.

== Namtars ==
Kumaradza accounts, or namtars, of his life are available in recent translations into English, The Nyingma School Of Tibetan Buddhism, Masters Of Meditation And Miracles, Marvelous Garland Of Rare Gems, among others.

There are no known extent writings, or not currently translated, by him.

== See also ==
- Nelug Dzö (gnas lugs mdzod)
