= Sri Singha =

Dzogchen lama

Sri Singha (Sanskrit: Śrī Siṃha, Tibetan: ཤྲི་སིང་ཧ, Wylie: shri sing ha) was the teacher of Padmasambhava, Vimalamitra, and Vairotsana. He was a principal student and dharma-son of Mañjuśrīmitra in the Dzogchen lineage, and is credited by the Nyingma school with introducing Dzogchen to Tibet.

According to the Nyingmapa tradition of Tibetan Buddhism, the Dzogchen masters Manjushrimitra and Shrisimha were already active in the Tantric milieu in India independently. However, Manjushrimitra, a learned scholar of Brahman origin, was evidently an adherent of the Yogachara school before his becoming a disciple of the mysterious Prahevajra or Garab Dorje (dga'-rab rdo-rje) from the country of Uddiyana (Eastern Afghanistan). It should also be recalled that his disciple Shrisimha was said to have been born and resided for some time in China (more likely Chinese Central Asia, or, more precisely, Burma, as Chogyal Namkhai Norbu told in a talk he had June 15, 2010) before coming to India. And that the latter's disciple Vimalamitra visited China (or Central Asia) before and after he came to Tibet and transmitted the Dzogchen teachings to his disciples at Samye Monastery.

== Life ==
Sri Singha is the son of King 'Accomplisher' and his wife queen Nantakā.

A.W. Barber notes that Sri Simha took the Atiyoga lineage to Andhra, in South India. He made his residence at Dhanyakataka.

Thus, it would appear that Sri Simha took the Atiyoga line to Andhra and made his residence at the famous Dhanyakataka along the Krishna River. From here it was transmitted to teachers who then took the line to Tibet and China.

== Achievements ==
Śrī Siṃha brought the Secret Mantra teachings from beneath the Vajra Throne in Bodhgaya to the 'Tree of Enlightenment' in China, where he concealed them in a pillar of the 'Auspicious Ten Thousand Gates Temple'.

Śrī Siṃha conferred the Eighteen Dzogchen Tantras (Tibetan: rdzogs chen rgyud bco brgyad) upon Padmasambhava. The eighteen are The Penetrating Sound Tantra (Tibetan: sgra thal ‘gyur), to which was appended the Seventeen Tantras of Innermost Luminosity (Tibetan: yang gsang 'od gsal gyi rgyud bcu bdun).

Kunsang, in rendering the instructions of Sri Singha to Padmasambhava, writes that:

In general, all phenomena belonging to samsara and nirvana are, from the very beginning, spontaneously perfected as the essence of awakened mind. However, because of failing to realize and not knowing this to be just how it is, sentient beings circle among the three realms and continue to wander among the six abodes. In order to guide them, it is generally said that an inconceivable number of doorways to the Dharma belonging to the various vehicles have been taught, but these can all be contained within development, completion and the Great Perfection.

Kunsang, in rendering the continued instructions of Sri Singha to Padmasambhava, outlines:

...there are the three sections of the philosophical vehicles belonging to nirmanakaya, the three sections of Kriya and Yoga belonging to sam-bhogakaya, and the three aspects of development, completion and the Great Perfection belonging to dharmakaya. Among these, I shall explain to you the Ati Yoga of Instructions, distilling its quintessence, which is the Innermost Vajra Essence of the Unexcelled Fruition. So listen, Padmasambhava.

'Philosophical vehicles' (Tibetan: rgyu'i theg pa) in the abovementioned quotation denotes Theravada and Mahayana as different from Vajrayana.

== Śrī Siṃha College ==
Śrī Siṃha College, founded by Gyalse Shenpen Thaye in 1848, is a Nyingmapa monastic college at Dzogchen Monastery in Kham in eastern Tibet. Tradition holds that a manifestation of Sri Singha marked the spot for the location of the university, hence its name. Do Khyentse Yeshe Dorje consecrated the site laying the foundation stone with his phurba. The original college was destroyed by the Chinese in the late 1950s. The college began to be restored in 1980; the process continues today.

== See also ==
- Narasimha – Man-lion and the fourth avatar of Hindu god Vishnu
- Nubchen Sangye Yeshe – One of the twenty-five principal students of Guru Padmasambhava
- Snow Lion – Mythical Tibetan creature
