= Simhamukha =

Tibetan Buddhist wisdom dakini (deity)

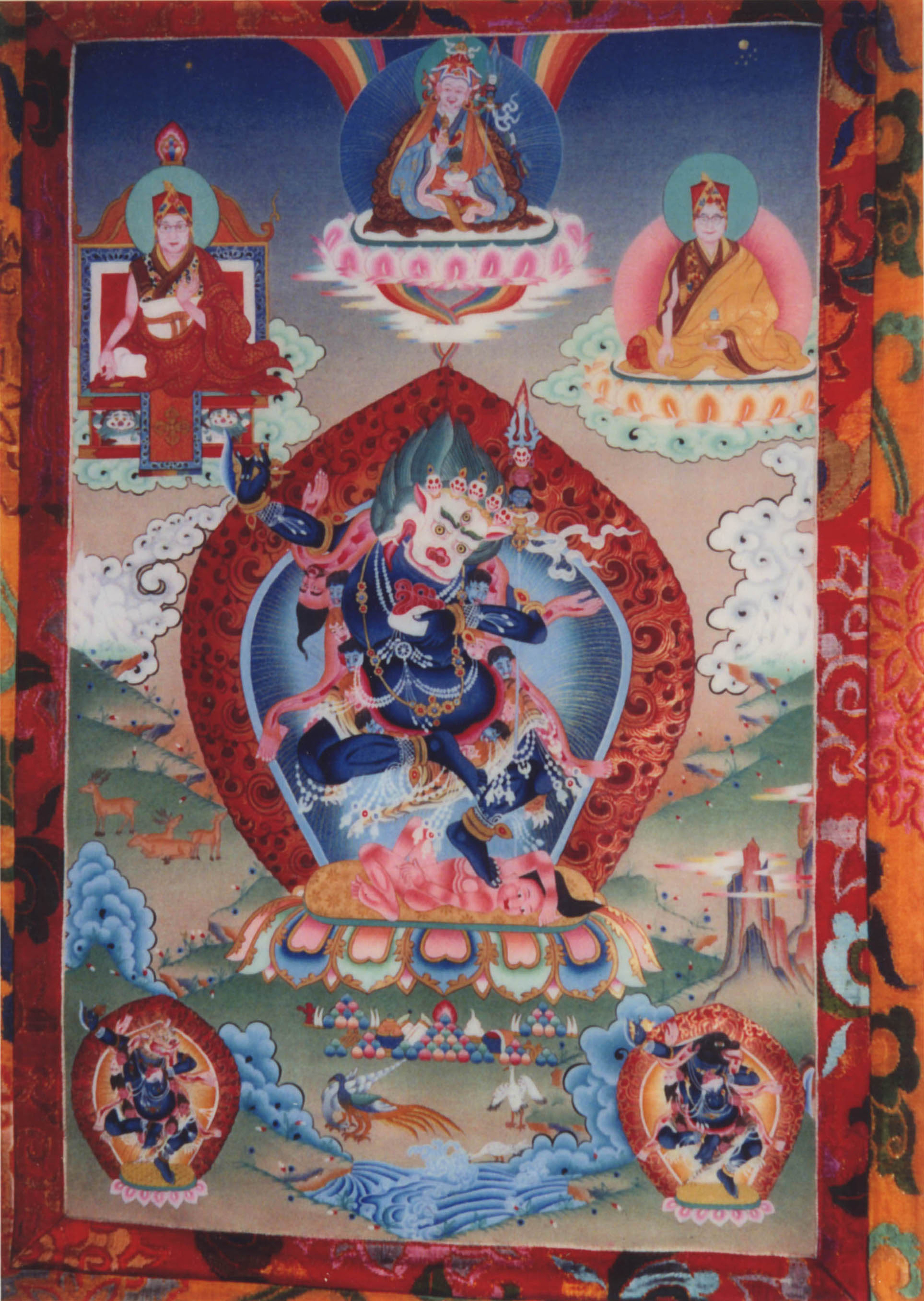
Fierce lion-headed dakini Simhamukha crowned with Padmasambhava

In Tibetan Buddhism, Siṃhamukhā (Tib. Senge Dongma) or Siṃhavaktra, also known as the Lion Face Dakini or Lion-headed Dakini, is a wisdom dakini of the Dzogchen tradition. She is represented as a fierce dakini with the head of a snow lion. Her mouth is depicted with a roar, symbolizing untamed fury and jubilant laughter. Her roar disperses discursive thoughts. She is naked, symbolizing that she herself is completely free of discursive thought.

She is considered to be an emanation or manifestation of Guhyajnana Dakini (the principal Dakini teacher of Padmasambhava in Uddiyana), or of Mandarava (one of his consorts), or of Sangwa Yeshe. She represents the accomplished female practitioner. As a meditation deity, her main function is averting magical attacks.

According to both John Reynolds and John Lash, she is the Indian goddess Pratyangira equivalent with the Egyptian goddess Sekmet.

== Description ==
According to the curators of the Himalayan Art Resources, the wisdom Dakini Simhamukha is visualized

with a body blue-black in colour, one face, two hands; three eyes, red, round and glaring; bared fangs and a curled tongue. The right hand holds aloft to the sky a curved-knife marked with a vajra. The left a blood filled skullcup to the heart, carrying a three-pointed khatvanga staff in the bend of the left elbow. Orange hair, eyebrows and beard flowing upwards, with five dry human heads as a crown and fifty wet, blood dripping, as a necklace. With five bone ornaments and a tiger skin as a lower garment; standing on the left leg with the right drawn-up, in the middle of a blazing fire of pristine awareness.

— sGrub Thabs Kun bTus, vol.8, folios 288-290. Translated in 1989.

=== Retinue ===
According to John Reynolds, Simhamukha

is surrounded by her retinue of four Dakinis who resemble herself, except for their body-color and certain attributes: in the east there is the white Buddha Simhamukha who has the magical function of pacifying circumstances and healing, in the south is the yellow Ratna Simhamukha who has the magical function of increasing wealth and prosperity, in the west is the red Padma Simhamukha who has the magical function of enchanting and bringing others under her power, and in the north is the dark green Karma Simhamukha who has the magical function of vanquishing and destroying negative forces. Each of these aspects of Simhamukha have their own mantras and rituals.

== Lineages ==
There are at least two major lineages of transmission, one in the Nyingma and another in the Sakya school. Although according to the tertön Nyangral Nyima Özer, the Nyingma Simhamukha is based on the Sakya tradition of Bari Lotsawa.

=== Nyingma ===
According to the terma (in Tibetan: gong ter, 'a treasure of the mind') tradition of the Nyingma school, Senge Dongma is a manifestation of Padmasambhava, a secret spiritual form of Guru Rinpoche specifically for removing spiritual obstacles and negativity. Accomplished practitioners often visualize Padmasambhava as Simhamukha during their meditative practices. According to Jamyang Khyentse Wangpo,

The uncommon lineage of the inner and secret empowerments and activity liturgies of the white, black and varied, is:
Dharmakāya Samantabhadra in union,
The wisdom ḍākinī Simḥamukhā,
The unequalled Guru of Uḍḍiyāna in union,
The realized Namkha Sangye Gönpo,
The destroyer of illusion, the great Repa Kunga Darpo,
The Mantra-holder Tsöndru Senge,
From whom my root teacher Chökyi Nyima
received the teachings on Siṃhamukhā.

=== Sakya ===
The Sakya lineage began with a terma discovered by Bari Lotsawa (1040–1111), who transmitted the teachings to Sachen Kunga Nyingpo. According to Jamyang Khyentse Wangpo,

The instructions on Siṃhamukhā were then transmitted to the precious teacher Jetsün Drakpa Gyaltsen, the great Sakya Paṇḍita, the great Jetsün Phakpa, Nyene Rongpo Dorje, Rongpo Sangye Yeshe, and the precious teacher of Rongpo, the learned Yakde Paṇchen.

== Termas ==
- Tertön Sogyal is credited with discovering and transcribing a terma he found in a remote hermitage.
- Tsasum Lingpa, Lion-Faced Dakini Practice that Subdues All Devils.

== Sadhanas ==
- Dudjom Rinpoche, A Daily 'Hand-Clapping' Practice of Siṃhamukhā.
- Jamyang Khyentse Wangpo, in The Excellent Vase of Precious Jewels (Rin-chen bum bzang), provides three sadhanas composed by Padma Gargyi Wangchuk (Jamgon Kongtrul).
- Lama Kunga Tartse Rinpoche, Sadhana of the Blue Lion-headed Dakini.

== See also ==
- Ayu Khandro
- Bodongpa
- Dorje Pakmo
- Krodikali
- Machig Labdrön
- Mandarava
- Narodakini
- Nubchen Sangye Yeshe
- Prajnaparamita
- Vajrayogini
- Yeshe Tsogyal
