= Rewalsar =

Rewalsar may refer to:

- Rewalsar Lake
- Rewalsar, India
