= Nyala Pema Dündul =

Chinese name
- Traditional Chinese: 雅拉貝瑪杜度爾
- Simplified Chinese: 雅拉贝玛杜度尔
Transcriptions
Standard Mandarin
- Hanyu Pinyin: Yǎlā Bèimǎ Dùdùěr
- Wade–Giles: Ya^{3}-la^{1} Pei^{4}-ma^{3} Tu^{4}-tu^{4}-erh^{3}

Tibetan name
- Tibetan: ཉག་བླ་པད་མ་བདུད་འདུལ
Transcriptions
- Wylie: nyag bla pad ma bdud 'dul

Nyala Pema Dündul (1816–1872), also known as Terton Nyala Pema Duddul, was a teacher of Dzogchen and Tantric Buddhism in Eastern Tibet.

In particular, he discovered and practiced the terma of the long-life practice of Guru Amitayus, called the Union of Primordial Essences.

Most sources state that the teacher in 1872 attained a level of realization known as rainbow body. According to one source, he deliberately did not, but reduced his dead body in size and transformed it so that it would not decompose. According to the source the small body is now hidden at a secret location.

Many of his students were said to have attained rainbow body (e.g. Ayu Khandro and Nyala Rinpoche Rigdzin Changchub Dorje).

Dündul was a vegetarian.
