= Rewalsar, India =

Rewalsar
- town
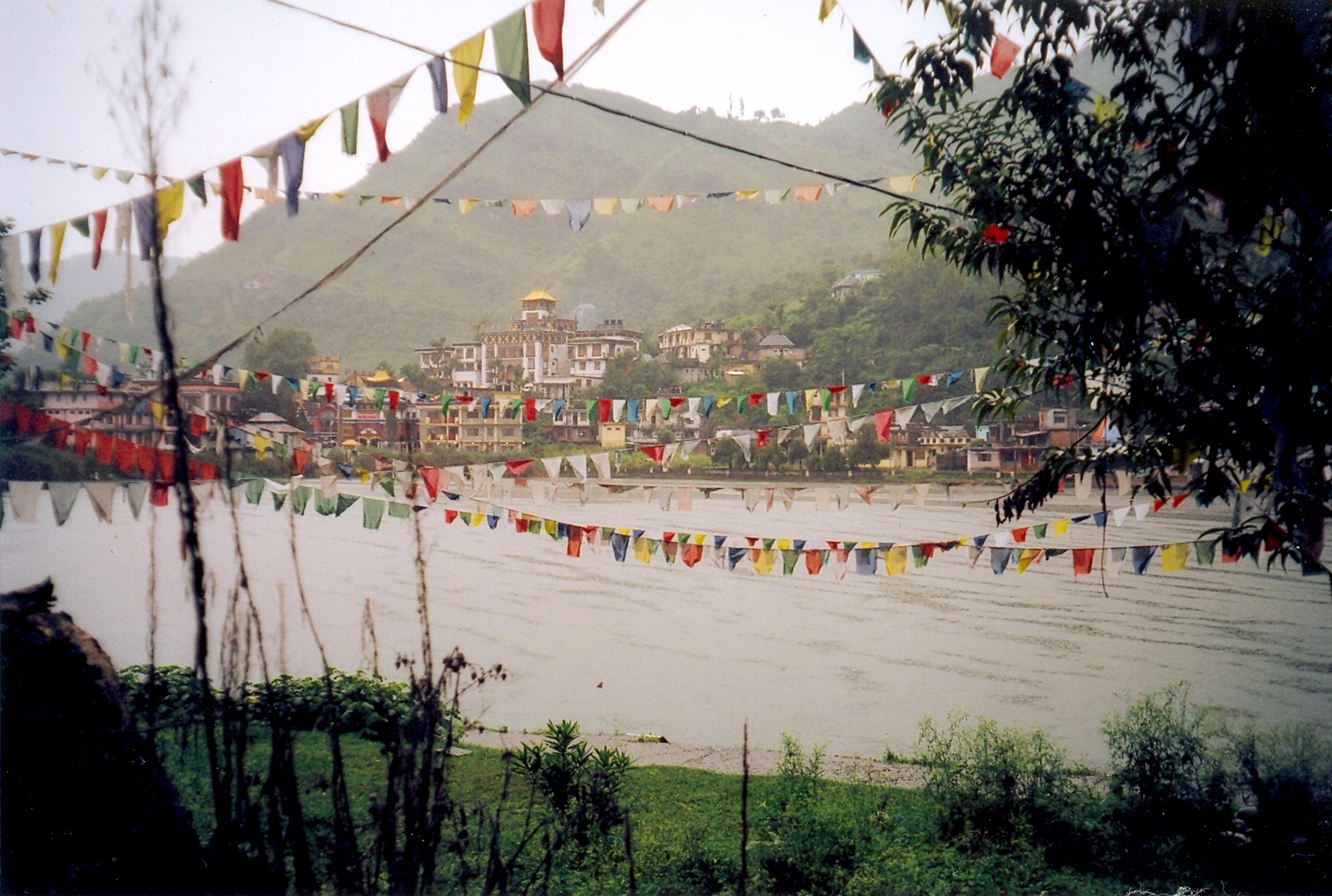
- Rewalsar Lake

- Location in Himachal Pradesh, India Rewalsar (India)
- Coordinates: 31.633889°N 76.833333°E
- Country: India
- State: Himachal Pradesh
- District: Mandi

Government
  - Body: Nagar Palika
- Elevation: 1,360 m (4,460 ft)

Population (2001)
  - Total: 1,369

Languages
  - Official: Hindi
- Time zone: UTC+5:30 (IST)
- Vehicle registration: HP- 82

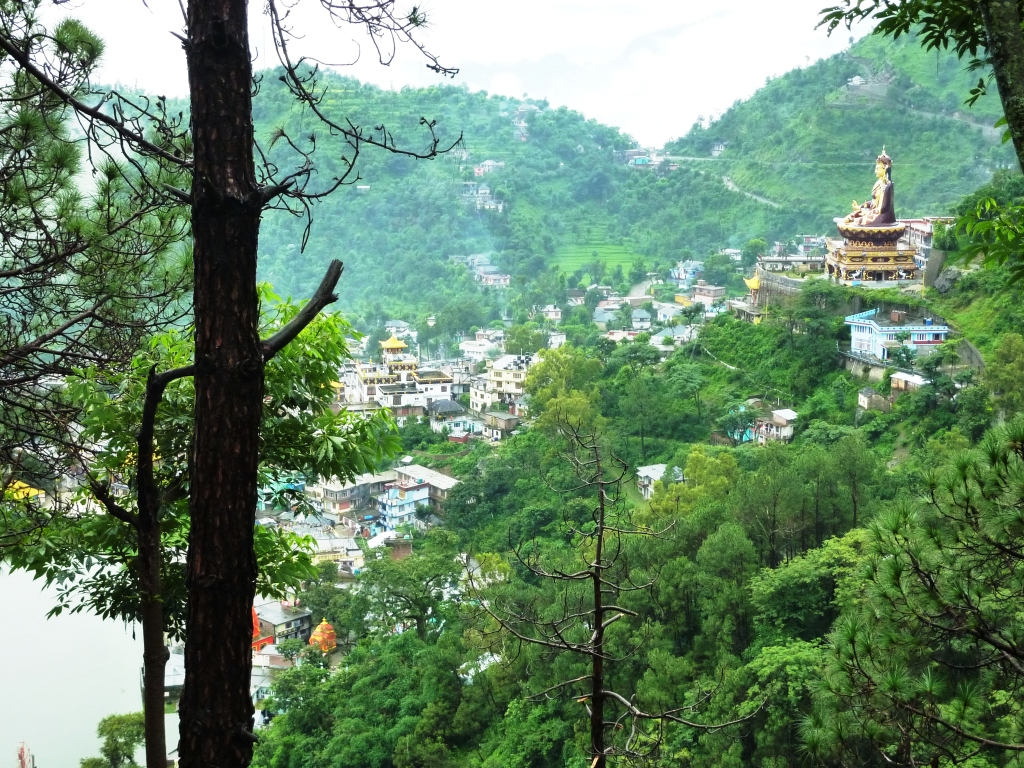
Guru Rinpoche overlooking Rewalsar

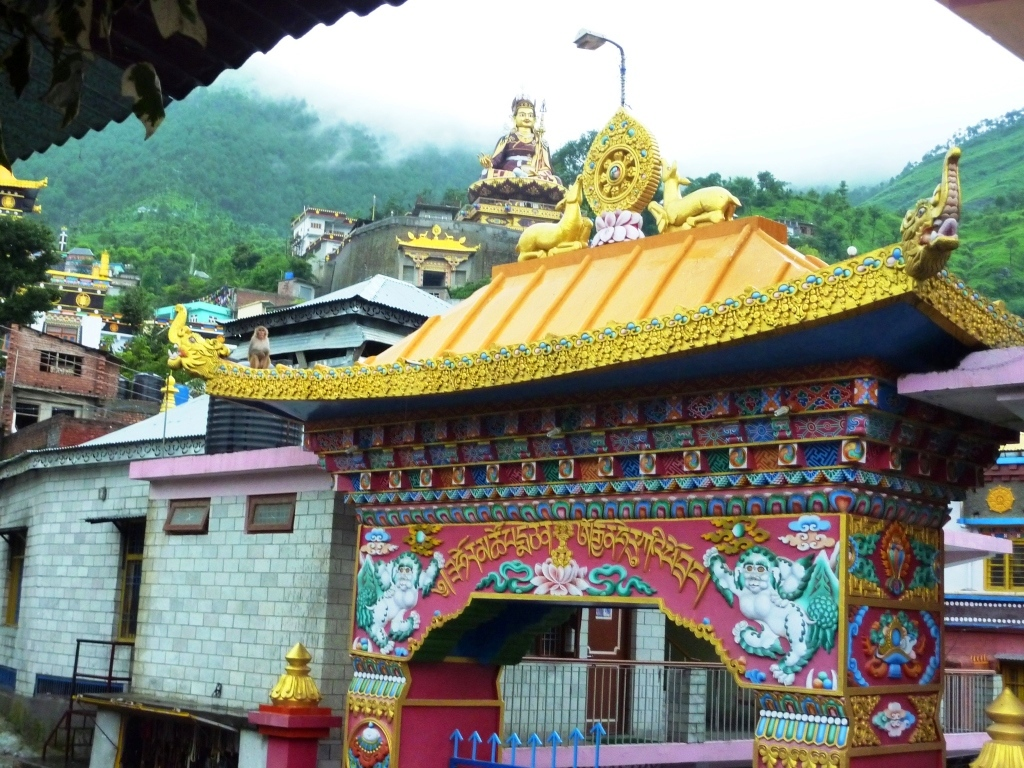
Entrance to Gompa and massive statue of Guru Rinpoche on hill behind. Rewalsar

Rewalsar or Tso Pema in Tibetan is a small town and a pilgrimage place in a nagar panchayat in Mandi district in India. It is located in the state of Himachal Pradesh. The local name for Rewalsar is Tri Sangam. Rewalsar Lake is a tourist spot in the area.

== Demographics ==
As of the 2001 India census, Rewalsar had a population of 1369. Males constitute 54% of the population and females 46%. Rewalsar has an average literacy rate of 76%, higher than the national average of 74.04%: male literacy is 78%, and female literacy is 73%. In Rewalsar, 12% of the population is under 6 years of age.

== Geography ==
Rewalsar is located at an altitude of 1360 m above sea level. It is connected to Mandi by a motorable road and is about 25 km from Mandi. Lying in the Southern Himalayan belt, winters in Rewalsar can be freezing, while summers are generally pleasant.

== Religion ==
Rewalsar is sacred to adherents of three major Dharma religions - Hinduism, Buddhism and Sikhism.

=== Hinduism ===
Seven lakes associated with the Pandavas of Mahabharata are located above Rewalsar(sarkidhar). Also associated with Rewalsar are the legends of Lord Shiva and Lomas Rishi. There is also a famous Krishna temple in the town.

The Hindu history of Rewalsar is found in Skanda Purana. A Hindu sage named Lomas was searching for place to worship. He traveled and climbed the top of Drona mountain, from the top saw a lake surrounded by trees, flowers and birds. He decided to meditate at the bank of the lake, written as Hridayeshwar in Skanda Purana. He meditated here, and Lord Shiva and Goddesses Parvati blessed him by imparting the secrets of this place where all the Devas and Ganas are in the form of flowers, and trees.

=== Sikhism ===
The tenth Guru of Sikhs, Guru Gobind Singh visited Rewalsar to consult with kings of the Hill states seeking support against the Mughal Emperor Aurangzeb. He stayed at Rewalsar for a month. Raja Joginder Sen of Mandi built a gurudwara at Rewalsar in 1930 to commemorate the Guru's visit. The place is particularly sacred to Namdhari Sikhs due to its mention in Sau Sakhi as a sanctuary.

=== Tibetan Buddhism ===
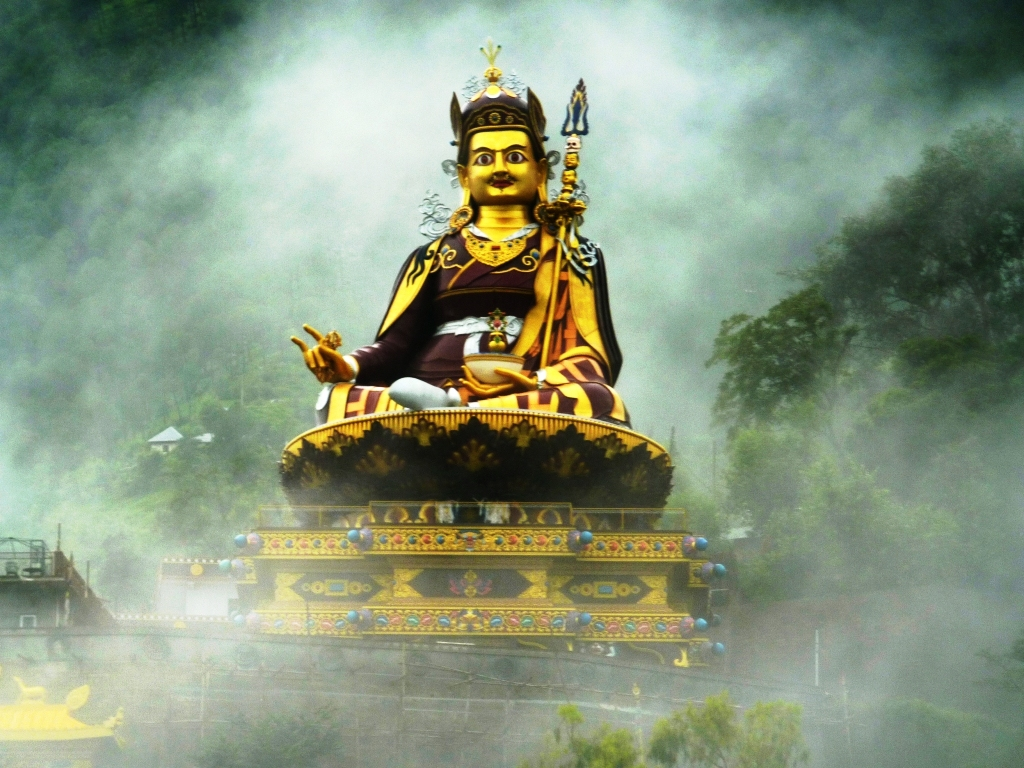
123 ft. (37.5 m) statue of Padmasambhava in mist at Rewalsar.

The famous Rewalsar Lake, or Tso Pema to Tibetans, is associated with Padmasambhava (also known as Guru Rinpoche), recognized as a second Buddha. One version of a legend has it that the King Arashadhar of Mandi had Padmasambhava burnt alive after rumours that the Guru had attempted to teach his daughter, Princess Mandarava the Dharma, which was not accepted then. The pyre burned for a full week, with great clouds of black smoke arising from it, but after a week, a lake appeared at the spot where he was burnt and Padmasambhava manifested himself as a 16-year-old boy from within a lotus in the middle of the lake, with Mandarava in his arms. The king, repenting his actions, married his daughter to Padmasambhava. It was from Tso Pema that Padmasambhava went to Tibet to reveal Vajrayana Buddhism, after Padmasambhava and Mandarava went to Nepal.

Rewalsar is a sacred place for Tibetan Buddhists and there are two Buddhist monasteries; the Drikung Kagyu Monastery and Tso-Pema Orgyen Heru-kai Nyingma Monastery. More than 50 nuns also live in the sacred caves, practicing in retreat. Buddhist practitioners are drawn to the Sacred Caves, as are tourists, coming from India, Nepal, Bhutan, China, and the west. The present head of the Drukpa Kagyu lineage of Tibetan Buddhism, Gyalwang Drukpa, was born here in 1963.

There is a Colossus (37.5 m or 123 ft) of Padmasambhava that was consecrated, blessed and inaugurated by the 14th Dalai Lama of Tibet on 1 April 2012.

The Tsechu fair was held in Rewalsar in 2004 to commemorate the birthday of Padmasambhava, Guru Rinpoche. The fair was inaugurated by the 14th Dalai Lama and was attended by the 17th Karmapa Orgyen Trinley Dorje along with 50,000 other Buddhist pilgrims. The fair was held after a gap of 12 years.

== Interests ==
=== Rewalsar Lake ===
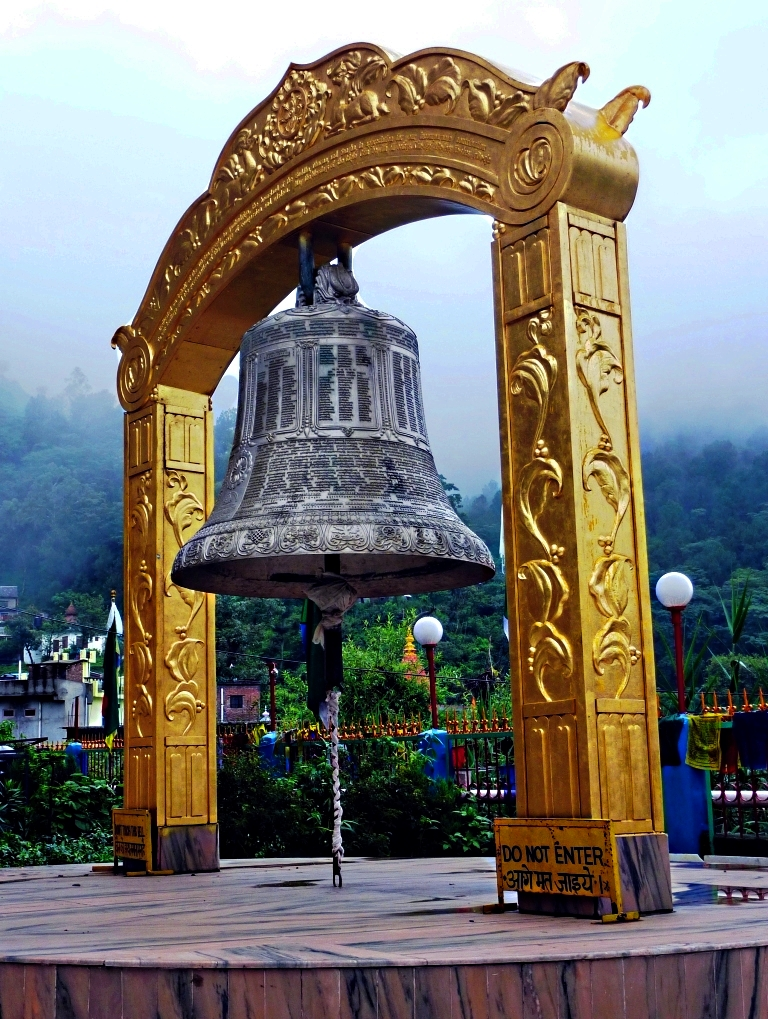
Big bell, Rewalsar, Himachal Pradesh, India in 2010

The lake around which the town of Rewalsar is established has a maximum depth of 16.5metres. The lake is oligotrophic in nature. It is rectangular in shape, with the catchment area situated to its north and west.

=== Spiritual sites ===
At Rewalsar there are three Hindu temples. These are dedicated to the Hindu sage Lomasha, to Krishna and to Shiva.

There are three Tibetan Buddhist monasteries located at opposite ends of the lake, and a shrine to Mandarava. Rewalsar Lake itself is a spiritual site created by the practice of Mandarava and Padmasambhava.

Also, there is a Gurdwara which was built in 1930 by Raja Joginder Sen of Mandi. It commemorates Guru Gobind Singh's visit, when he sought to evolve a common strategy with the hill rulers against the Mughal emperor Aurangzeb.

=== Colossus of Padmasambhava (Guru Rinpoche) ===
On April 1, 2012, a monumental statue (37.5 m or 123 ft) of Padmasambhava was consecrated, blessed and inaugurated by the 14th Dalai Lama. The building project, spear-headed by Wangdor Rinpoche took nearly 10 years to complete, with the foundation alone taking 3 years to construct. It was constructed almost entirely by hand by tradespeople from the immediate Rewalsar area as well as master artists from Nepal and Bhutan.

=== Naina Mata Temple ===
The Hindu temple of Naina Devi sits upon the hilltop, which provides views of the town and the surrounding hills. The 'seven lakes' as well as various Buddhist temples are on the way to the temple. A PWD guest-house is located besides the temple.

=== Other interests ===
The forest department maintains a small zoo at Rewalsar. Above Rewalsar, the 'Seven Lakes' including the 'Kunti Lake' are also of interest.
