= Ayu Khandro =

Tibetan Buddhist terton and teacher

- ཨ་ཡུ་མཁའ་འགྲོ་
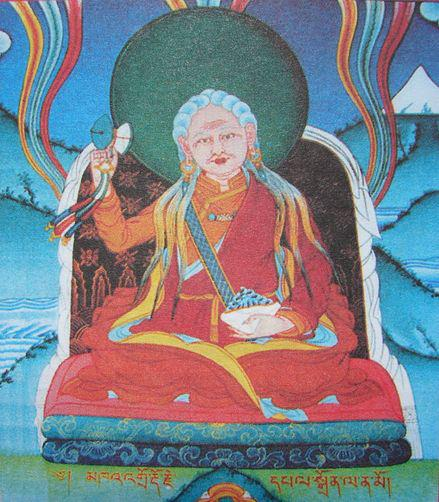
- Painting of Ayu Khandro at Merigar West

Personal life
- Born: 1839 Dzong Trang, Kham, Tibet
- Died: 1953 (aged 113–114)

Religious life
- Religion: Buddhism
- School: Dzogchen
- Dharma name: Dorje Paldrön

Senior posting
- Teacher: Togden Rangrig

Ayu Khandro (Tibetan: ཨ་ཡུ་མཁའ་འགྲོ་, Wylie: A-yu Mkha'-'gro, "Long Life Dakini", 1839 – 1953), also known as Dorje Paldrön, was a Tibetan yogini, practitioner and terton of Tantric Buddhism in Eastern Tibet. An accomplished Dzogchen meditator, she is known for her extensive pilgrimages throughout Tibet, long periods of dark retreat (Note: known in Tibetan as Yangti Nagpo) practice, the gongter (Note: a directly revealed text, terma, in the mind of the practitioner) of the practice of the yidam Senge Dongma (the Lion-Faced Dakini), various forms of Chöd, (Note: The Dzinpa Rangdröl sadhana cycle was one among the many forms of Chöd that she practiced and transmitted.) and her lifelong dedication to spiritual practice.

Much of the information we have about Ayu Khandro comes from the oral commentary that she gave in person to Chogyal Namkhai Norbu in Dzongsa in 1951. He wrote her namthar, or spiritual biography, which was later published in Women of Wisdom by Tsultrim Allione.

Ayu Khandro met, and was taught by, many great masters of her day: Jamyang Khyentse Wangpo, Jamgon Kongtrul the First, Chokgyur Lingpa, Nyala Pema Dündul, Adzom Drukpa, Togden Rangrig and the ninth Tai Situpa, Pema Nyingche Wangpo.

She led the life of a hidden yogini, spending a significant amount of her life in retreat or as a wandering chodma. (Note: female practitioner of chod) She was recognised as an emanation of Vajrayogini. She is reported to have lived to the age of 115.

== Early life (1839–1846) ==
Ayu Khandro was born during the winter of 1839 in Kham, Eastern Tibet, in the village of Dzong Trang. Her father Tamdrin Gon and her mother's name was Tsokyi. Present at her birth was a local togden, (Note: rtogs ldan - 'endowed with realization', an epithet for a highly realized yogi) Togden Rangrig, who gave her the name Dechen Khandro (Great Bliss Dakini). She joined his community at the age of seven.

She grew up as the youngest in a family of three sons and four daughters; living a traditional Khampa lifestyle where the women looked after the animals and the men were traders. "Since I was the youngest and the weakest I was sent to look after the small animals and given the worst clothes."

== Leaving home and early meditation training (1846-1857) ==
Togden Rangrig had a small community of meditators in the caves of a nearby mountain to where Ayu Khandro lived. This place was called Drag ka Yang Dzong. Her Aunt, Dronkyi, was a member of this community and lived in a cave near that of the Togden. At the age of seven, in 1846, Ayu Khandro went to join them. She assisted them in retreat, bringing fire wood and water. During this period she learned how to read and write Tibetan with Kunzang Longyang, a skill in which she reached a good level of proficiency, reading the Kangyur twice with the community.

At the age of 13, Ayu Khandro received her first initiation, the Longsal Dorje Nyingpo (The Vajra Essence of the Clear Expanse). (Note: a terma (treasure) teaching rediscovered by Rigdzin Longsal Nyingpo (1625-1692)) Following the pattern of many yoginis she was betrothed against her will. (Note: For example, see the biographies of Machig Labdron, Drenchen Rema, Nangsa Obum, Yeshe Tsogyal, and Mandarava) After her aunt's intercession the marriage was delayed until she was 19.

In Kham, at this time, there were many important and accomplished Rinpoches. (Note: tibetan for 'precious one', an individual who has been recognised as the incarnation of a previous spiritual master) Yet there are three that stand out among the others: Jamyang Khyentse Wangpo, Jamgon Kongtrul the 1st and Chokgyur Lingpa. They were all proponents of the Rime movement in Tibet. When Ayu Khandro was 14, she travelled with Togden Rangrig and Dronkyi to see these three teachers consecrate Dzong Tsho (Fortress Lake). Here she met many other masters and received considerable meditation instruction. On the return journey, we have the first mention of her meeting the 9th Tai Situpa, Pema Nyingche Wangpo from whom she received instruction on the meditation yidam White Tara.

Back at Drag ka Yang Dzong, she dedicated her time to the Ngondro of the Longchen Nyingtig lineage under the guidance of Kunzang Longyang.

Two years later, in 1854, she made another pilgrimage to see her root teacher Jamyang Khyentse Wangpo. Although he was in retreat due, he gave Ayu Khandro teachings on his White Tara terma, called the Pema Nyingtig (Heart Essence of the Lotus) for over a month and the spiritual name Tsewang Paldron (Glorious Life Empowerment). On return to Togden Rangrig, Ayu Khandro dedicated herself to this practice.

== Marriage and illness (1857–1865) ==
In the summer of 1857, against her own and her aunt Dronkyi's wishes, Ayu Khandro was married to Apho Wangdo of the wealthy Gara Tsong family. She stayed with her husband, who was kind and generous, for three years. Yet, after this, Ayu Khandro fell ill to an undiagnosable illness (Note: possible prana (air) disease, convulsions, circulation problems) and was in weakened health for the next two years. With no improvement or response to any treatment and near death, Togden Rangrig and Dronkyi were called and they stated that Ayu Khandro's marriage was blocking her strong orientation and propensity to meditation practice causing her to become ill. Apho Wangdo agreed to alter their relationship to one of vajra brother and sister and thus Ayu Khandro slowly recovered.

Ayu Khandro then returned to the caves of Drag ka Yang Dzong, where she spent a year recovering, assisted by a nun in the community. During this year she began to receive teachings again, namely the terma of Guru Chowang. (Note: Terton of the 13th century, consort of the yogini and Chöd practitioner Jomo Memo.)

While she was recovering she had a dream that indicated the death of her mentor Togden Rangrig. On her request he gave her a meditation practice to extend his life and he lived another 3 years. As well as living most of her life with him and him being present at her birth he gave her all the teachings he received from his teachers; Motrul Choying Dorje, Migyur Namkhai Dorje - the Fourth Dzogchen Drubwang and Rigdzin Pema Dupa Tsel. At this time he also gave her the teachings on the Dzogchen of Nyima Drapa, from the terton Nyima Odzer (1124–92). (Note: one of greatest tertons and the first terton king) Now having the freedom and health to practice Ayu Khandro, now 23 or 24, dedicated herself to extended, serious meditation.

== Death of Togden Rangrig and retreat (1865–1868) ==
Yet in 1865, at 77, Togden Rangrig died. The sign of an accomplished meditator his body remained in final meditation posture, tukdam, for seven days. After this period his body was the size of an eight year old. This dissolution of the body into the elements at the time of death is called the rainbow body and is the highest attainment of Dzogchen meditation. At the time of cremation signs of the meditative realization of the practitioner can appear. and at Ayu Khandro was present for this, and she recalled: " As we were making the funeral pyre and preparing the body to be burned everyone heard a loud noise like a thunderclap. A strange half-snow half-rain fell."

At the end of the cremation they found that Dronkyi, her aunt and spiritual companion since she was 7 had left her body at the age of 62. Dronkyi remained in seated meditation position for 3 days after her death, a sign of high spiritual attainment. She too was cremated on the same spot as Togden Rangrig. Sounds from the cremation pyre were reported by many people. The close time of death of Togden Rangrig and Dronkyi could indicate that they were a spiritual couple, (Note: other examples include; Padmasambhava and Yeshe Tsogyel, Sera Khandro and Drime Ozer and more recently Tare Lhamo and Namtrul Rinpoche) practicing the highest levels of buddhist meditation known as karmamudra. In Tibetan Buddhism realized beings are often shown in union or yabyum (Note: literally in Tibetan 'father-mother') representing the union of wisdom and compassion.

In response to these events Ayu Khandro entered a strict 3 year retreat in Dronkyi's cave.

== Pilgrimage in Eastern Tibet (1868–71) ==
=== Adzom Gar, Tromtar Region, Kham - Teachers: Namkhai Dorje, Nyala Pema Dundel (1868) ===
Before Togden Rangrig had died he instructed Ayu Khandro to visit Nyala Pema Dundel, a terton and accomplished teacher of Dzogchen. So when she was 30 she left for Adzom Gar with Kunzang Longyang and the nun who had assisted her in retreat. Travelling for over a month and a half visiting sacred places, they arrived before Nyala Pema Dundel's teachings. So they then received the teaching Adzom's Drukpa uncle, Namkhai Dorje, was giving to Adzom Drukpa on Longde (space series).

Practices received from Namkhai Dorje

Longde

Practices received from Nyala Pema Dundel

The Tshog Chen Dupa, the Tara Gonpa Rangdro, a practice for the time of death and his gongter the Kha Khyab Rangdrol.

=== Dzogchen and Sechen Monastery, Derge Region, Kham ===
Ayu Khandro now travelled with some of Adzom Drukpa's students to 2 famous and important Nyingma Monasteries, Dzogchen and Sechen. An accomplished Chodpa, Lhawang Gonpa, instructed her on tummo (Note: made famous by Milarepa) (inner heat practice) and chulen (extracting the essence); this allowed her to live comfortably through the intense cold at Dzogchen. It was here that she met an important female figure in her life, Pema Yangkyi, with whom she travelled, practiced and established a deep friendship with for many years.

Practices taught by Lhawang Gonpo

Chod, Tummo, Chulen

=== Tashi Lhatse, Marcho - Teacher: Jamyang Khyentse Wangpo (1869) ===
Aged 31, she travelled with Lhawang Gonpo, Pema Yangkyi, Jigme, a khenpo from Dzogchen and 10 of his disciples to see Jamyang Khyentse Wangpo. Yet when they arrived he couldn't be reached as he was in strict retreat so they went to Katu Payal Monastery. The 3 friends then adopted a vagabond lifestyle, begging, so they could return to Marcho. As Khyentse was still in retreat they decided to also begin intensive practice nearby. After a month, a monk called Sonam Wangpo visited and told Khyentse of their presence and he decided to secretly teach them.

Teachings commenced on Jomo Memo's anniversary, when she attained the rainbow body. She was an important female terton (treasure revealer) whose terma (treasure), the Khandro Sangdu (Secret Gathering of the Dakinis), Jamyang Khyentse Wangpo rediscovered through his terma.

=== Dzongsar Monastery, Derge Region ===
When they had finished receiving teachings and practiced they returned to Jamyang Khyentse Wangpo's monastery, Dzongsar. There with hundreds others they received the Nyingtik Yabzhi (Note: four series on Man. Ngag.sDe, leads to development of thodgal) for 3 months. She also received from him numerous teachings from across the 4 schools (Note: Nyingma, Kagyu, Sakya and Gelug) of Tibetan Buddhism and teachings from Teachers from all over Tibet who were also present.

Practices received from Jamyang Khyentse Wangpo

Khandro Sangdu, Nyingtik Yabzhi

=== Karko, Nyarong Region - Teacher: Nyala Pema Dundel (1870) ===
At 31 Ayu Khandro and her close friend, Pema Yangkyi, continued their pilgrimage to see Nyala Pema Dundel in Karko, with some of Khyentse's disciples. Here they received the Longsal Dorje Nyingpo (The Vajra Essence of the Clear Expanse), a teaching that was her first initiation at the age of 13. Another important teaching that she received here was the Yangti Nagpo, also known as the dark retreat, a practice Ayu Khandro dedicated many years to later in her life. They remained here for 3 months.

==== Nying Lung, Tsela Wongdo ====
Nyala Pema Dundel was travelling to Nying Lung in the Tsela Wongdo area and they decided to travel with him to receive the Kha Khyab Rangdrol. He called for them at the end of the teachings and gave them Dharma names, (Note: this is a practice given to create a link with the teacher and lineage) Dorje Paldron (Glorious Indestructible Vajra) for Ayu Khandro and Osel Palkyi (Glorious Clear Light) for Pema Yangkyi. He also gave them important practice advice, "Go to practice in cemeteries and sacred places. Follow the method of Machig Labdron (Note: practice of Chod) and overcome hope and fear. If you do this you will attain stable realization. During your travel you will encounter 2 yogis who will be important for you." Giving them a Chod drum each, they set off with only drum and stick.

Teachings received from Nyala Pema Dundel

Longsal Dorje Nyingpo, Yangti Nagpo, Kha Khyab Rangdrol

=== Return to the caves of Togden Randgrig (1871) ===
Aged 31 Ayu Khandro and Pema Yangkyi arrived at her old home, Drag ka Yang Dzong, where the caves of her old mentor Togden Rangrig and her aunt Dronkyi were. The only people left were a young nun Chang Chub, an old disciple Togden Pagpa and Kunzang Longyang. They stayed for a period of 2 weeks performing Guru Yoga, feast offerings and practice of the Guardians. Then after a fire puja the 2 friends and Kunzang Longyang left for pilgrimage around Central Tibet.

== Pilgrimage to Central Tibet through Southern Tibet (1871–73) ==
=== Tsawa ===
The first place of pilgrimage was the region of Tsawa, with which they reached with about 20 other people also traveling on pilgrimage to Central Tibet. As instructed by Nyala Pema Dundel they begged for their food. On one of their alms rounds on the plateau of Gurchen Thang they came by a large encampment of nomads. Sitting to sing the Chöd practice they were approached by a young woman whose husband had been murdered. Neither of them had any experience dealing with funerals yet as dealing with the dead and especially those who died in unfavorable ways is strongly connected to Chöd they agreed.Traveling to a cemetery to the south they came across another wandering male Chöd practitioner. They then remembered Nyala Pema Dundel's prophecy that they would meet a Chodpa who would help them in Tsawa. On meeting them the Chodpa asked which one of them was Dorje Paldron? He then stated, " I am a disciple of Khyentse Yeshe Dorje (Do Khyentse), my name is Semnyi Dorje and I was born in Kongpo. I have no fixed abode. I have been practicing here for the last few days. Several days ago when I was between sleeping and waking I received a communication that someone called Dorje Paldron was coming." He then offered to help them with murdered corpse and they all practiced for 7 days. Semnyi Dorje also gave them teachings on the Dzinpa Rangdrol (Note: 'Natural Liberation of Grasping') chöd.

Teachings received from Togden Semnyi Dorje

Dzinpa Rangdrol Chod of Do Khyentse Yeshe Dorje

=== Tsari, Chikchar ===
Ayu Khandro, Pema Yangkyi, Kunzang Longyang and Togden Semnyi stayed in this area of Zayu and Tsari for a year and 3 months meditating in important pilgrimage places. Tsari is one of the 3 most important sacred mountains (the others being Kailash and Labchi) in Tibet and an area synonymous with pilgrimage and the sacred in the Tibetan Buddhist worldview. This is due to all 3 mountains being part of the 24 sacred places of the mandala of Chakrasmabhava and Vajravahari. Tsari is also associated with Shambala.

=== Death of Kunzang Longyang (1872) ===
In 1872 their companion Kunzang Longyang who had joined them from Togden Rangrig's caves died after intense fever at the age of 56. At the funeral which Ayu Khandro, Pema Yangkyi and Togden Semnyi performed there were many auspicious signs of accomplishment and a rainbow. They stayed there for another 3 months doing practice for Kunzang Longyang.

=== Lhodrak, Jar and Pema Ling (1872) ===
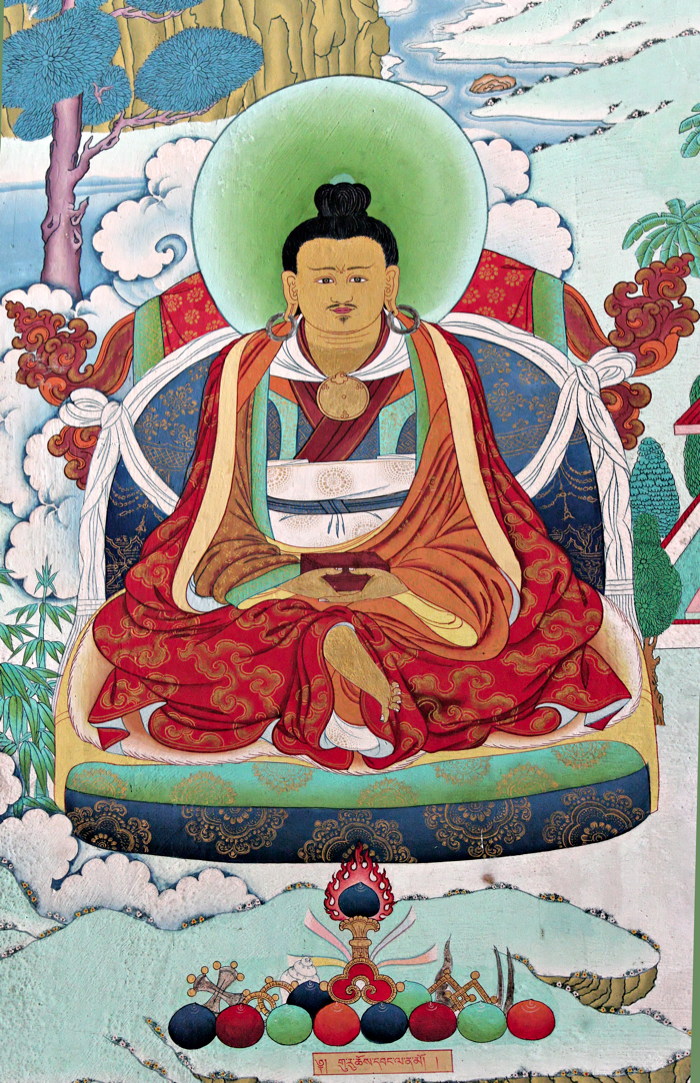
Guru Chowang

Lhodrak (Note: now known as Lhozang County) is the heartland of the famous Kagyu patriarch Marpa Lotsawa and where the esteemed Tibetan yogi Milarepa performed his spiritual hardships before initiation. Guru Chowang was also born here in 1212. He was the teacher and consort of Jomo Memo, a female terton from whose teachings, the Khandro Sangdu, Ayu Khandro had received from Jamyang Khyentse Wangpo.

South west of Lhodrak is the lake at Pema Ling which is next to the mountain Kula Kangri on the border of Bhutan. The lake was especially significant to Ayu Khandro as a place of pilgrimage as many accomplished meditators had lived and practiced there.

=== Meeting Trulzi Garwang Rinpoche in Rona (1872) ===
Ayu Khandro's close friend Pema Yangkyi went to Rona where she met a yogi called Gargyi Wanchug (also known as Trulzi Garwang Rinpoche). This fulfilled Nyala Pema Dundel's prophecy about meeting 2 important yogis, one in Southern Tibet. On meeting Gargyi stated: " Three months ago I was practicing in Ralung, the original seat of the Drukpa Kagyu lineage, and I had a vision of Dorje Yudronma. She gave me a little roll of paper about as long as my finger. I quickly unrolled it and it said 'In the tenth month of the tenth day go in practice to a place called Rona."

Trulzi Garwang Rinpoche had a large following around the lake at Pema Ling and was a student of the female teacher Mindroling Jetsun Rinpoche, learning the Dzogchen termas of Mindroling from her. Here they learnt more Chod from him with his students and practiced intensively, completing the 100 000 Chod feast offerings.

== Pilgrimage to Western Tibet (via Nepal) (1873 ==
After meeting Trulzi Rinpoche they once again became four; Ayu Khandro and Togden Semnyi, Pema Yangkyi and Trulzi Rinpoche. As Trulzi Rinpoche was going to Mount Kailash (Gang Rinpoche) in Western Tibet they decided to join him.

=== Yamdrok Lake (1873) ===
Their first stop was Yamdrok Lake, one of the four holiest lakes in Tibet especially connected to divination. It is an area also associated with Padmasambhava.

=== Ralung (1873) ===
They stayed here for over a month while Trulzi Garwang gave teachings on Ati Zadon (Note: Dzogchen terma of Zigpo Lingpa (1829-70)) to some of his students.

Practice from Trulzi Garwang

Ati Zadon

=== Tingri (1873) ===
For the summer months they lived and practiced in Tingri, the holy area associated with the Indian Mahasiddha Padampa Sangye, one of the forefathers of Chod, with his practice of Shijay or Pacification.

== Pilgrimage in Nepal (1873) ==
Travelling south from Tingri they began their pilgrimage to some of the places associated with the power places of the mandala of Chakrasambhava/Vajrayogini in Nepal. Having to go through the areas near the sacred areas that Milarepa practiced and crossing the Himalayas they entered Nepal at Nyalam, which is now on the Friendship Highway.

=== Maratika (Halesi Mahadevsthan) ===
Their first major pilgrimage destination was the famous cave of Maratika. This area is associated with long life practice as it is the place where Padmasambhava and the dakini Mandarava attained the longlife practice of Amitayus. Here they practiced White Tara (especially associated with long life) and the Pema Nyintik (Heart essence of the lotus) of her teacher Jamyang Khyentse Wangpo. Here Ayu Khandro and Pema Yangkyi gave the transmission of the Pema Nyingtik to Togden Trulzi.

=== Kathmandu and the stupa of Swayambhu ===
From Maratika they travelled west to the ancient capital of Nepal, Kathmandu, part of the sacred mandala of Chakrasambhava. Moving through the sacred sites of the Kathmandu valley and especially the famous stupa of Swayambhu for a month they made offerings and then practiced Chod for another month. They started to become quite well known receiving many invitations, yet seeing this as the obstacle of fame they left the area.

=== Yanglesho in Parping and Dakshinkali ===
Moving south west of Kathmandu they arrived at Yanglesho in Parphing, for the important pilgrimage cave of Padmasambhava and his Nepalese consort Shakyadevi. The other cave in Parphing is the Asura Cave and they visited the Vajrayogini Temple, part of the 24 tantric powerplaces of Chakrasambhava and Vajrayogini. A few miles south of Parphing they travelled to one of the most famous tantric Hindu shrines, the temples of the goddess Kali, Dakshinkali.

=== Purang, Kyung Lung, Dolpo (1874) ===
Moving west out of the Kathmandu valley they passed through Purang, heading for Dolpo and arrived at a previous practice cave of Togden Trulzhi, Kyung Lung. Here they received an in depth teaching and transmission of the Khandro Nyingtik from Togden Trulzhi. They also gave the transmission of the Khandro Sangdu of Jamyang Khyentse Wangpo to Togden Trulzhi.

== Mount Kailash (Gang Rinpoche - Precious Jewel of Snows) (1874–77) ==
In 1874 all four pilgrims arrived at Mount Kailash, entering from western Nepal. Mount Kailash is a deeply sacred place to the 4 religions, Buddhism, Bon, Hinduism and Jainism. Many famous and not so famous saints practiced here including Milarepa and Padmasambhava. In Buddhism Mount Kailash is seen as the home of Chakrasambhava. We have seen throughout her pilgrimage the theme of visiting the sacred powerplaces of Chakrasambhava and Vajrayogini. Togden Trulzi guided them here and they spent over 3 years here meditating in many sacred caves and visiting many pilgrimage places. After this period Pema Yangkyi and Togden Trulzi decided to stay, whereas Ayu Khandro and Togden Semnyi decided to go to Central Tibet.

== The return home - pilgrimage to Central Tibet (1877) ==
At first they went to Maryul (what is now known as Ladakh) practicing Chod along the way, including Jomo Nagpa, the residence of Taranatha.

=== Tanang and Ngang Cho (1877) ===
Here resided Gyurme Pema Tenzin, a Dzogchen meditation master with whom they stayed for 9 months receiving teachings on Dzogchen Semde. They also received full teachings in the 18 series of Dzogchen which included initiations and explanations.

=== Usang and Lhasa (1878) ===
When Ayu Khandro was 40 they arrived in the Central province of Tibet called Usang (or U) meaning literally front Tibet. At first they visited the shrine of the Blue Vajra Sadhu a protector of Dzogchen. Then they arrived in Lhasa the capital of Usang and where the Dalai Lama resided. They visited all the holy places here, including Sera, Drepung, Trayepa, Ganden, Katsal, Zvalakang. Moving into the surrounding valley out of Lhasa they also visited Yangri, Drigung and Tidrom.

== Death ==
Ayu Khandro died in 1953.

== See also ==
- List of supercentenarians
