= Mata Kuan Rani Temple =

Temple in Mandi, Himachal Pradesh, India

Coordinates: 31°43′N 76°55′E

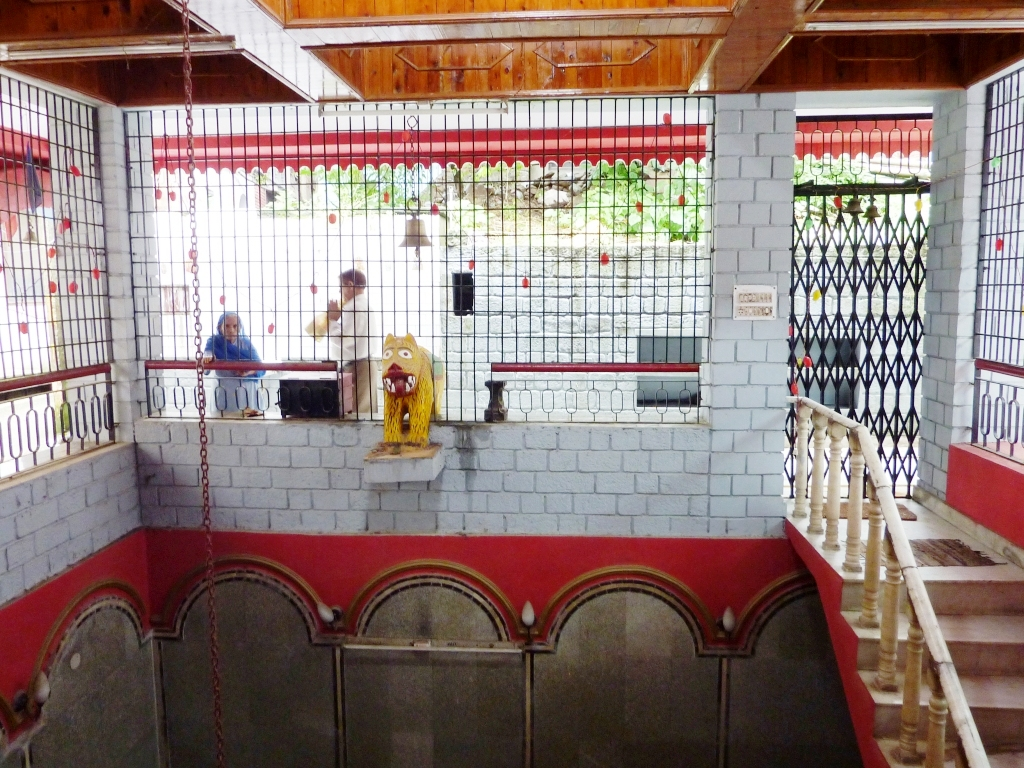
Entrance to Mata Kuan Rani Temple

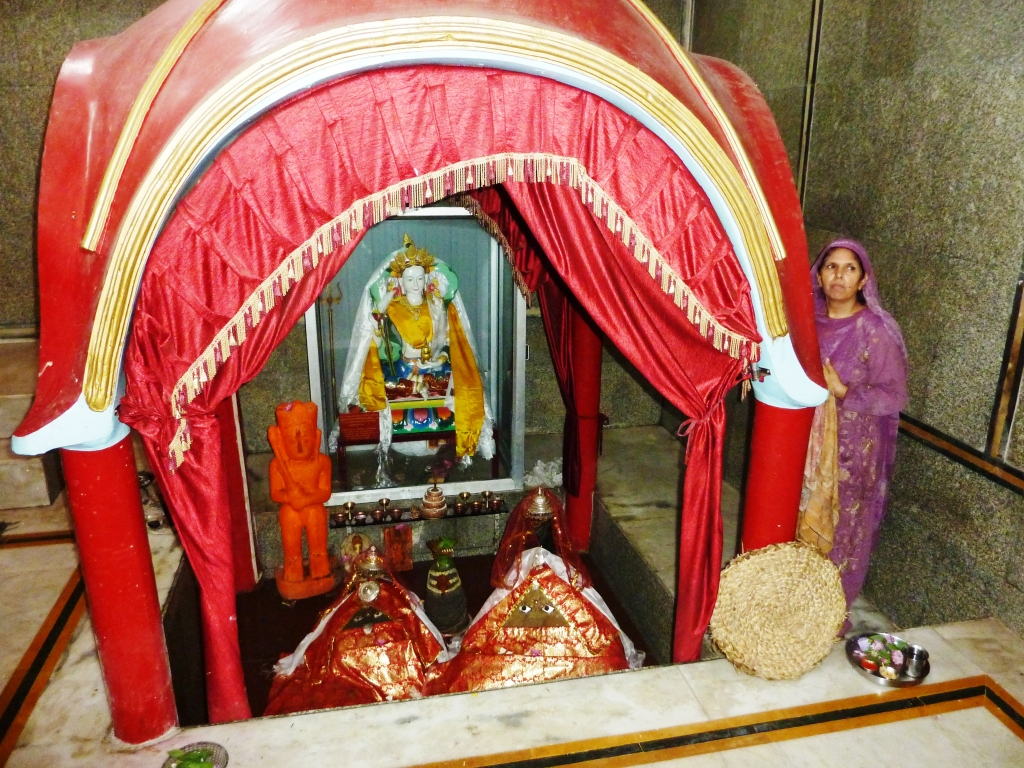
Temple shrine and attendant

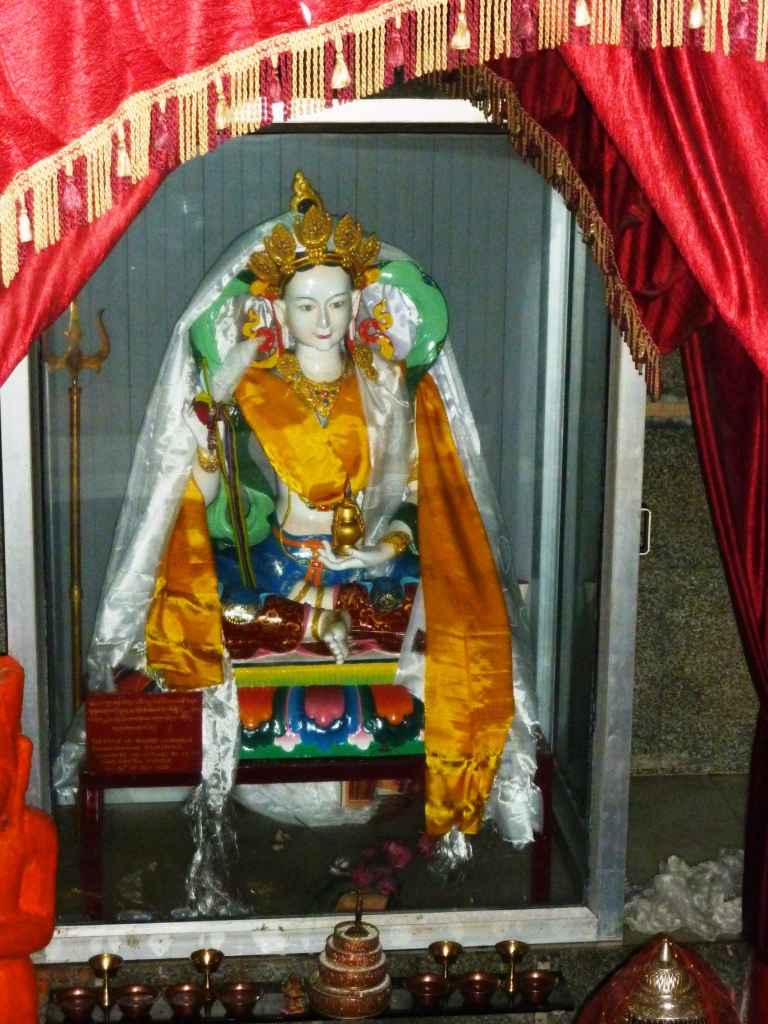
Princess Mandarava statue in shrine.

The Mata Kuan Rani Temple, or 'Princess of the Well Temple', is situated near the bank of the Beas River in the town of Mandi, Himachal Pradesh, India. This is the place where the princess Mandarava was imprisoned by her father.

== Description and history ==
The slate-roofed temple over a deep well is dedicated to the 'Princess of the Well' and celebrates the time when, according to legend, Princess Mandarava (man da ra ba me tog), the Princess of Zahor (or Sahor), which is usually identified with Mandi, though some scholars place it in eastern India), became a consort of Padmasambhava (Tibetan: Guru Rinpoche).

Mandarava, the daughter of King Arshadhara and Queen Mohauki, is said to have been born a prodigy and an 'Awareness Dakini' (yes-shes mkha'-'gro) and was very beautiful. She refused all offers of marriage and fed her father the flesh of a Brahmin (a terrible offence), left the palace, and took on the robes of a beggar. She was ordained by the famous Buddhist scholar Śāntarakṣita, who is also said to have been a native of Zahor, and came to terms with her father who provided a palace for her meditation. When Padmasambhava came to Zahor from Orgyen, she fell for him and became his disciple.

The king became incensed and condemned them both to death in a fire which raged for seven days. After the smoke cleared there was a lake with a lotus in it, Rewalsar (Tibetan: Tso Pema or 'Lotus Lake'), which is situated about 24 km from Mandi. This convinced the king of the wisdom and power of Padmasambhava and he requested teachings from him and gave his daughter permission to pursue her religious destiny.

The temple is sacred to both Tibetan Buddhists and Hindus, and was commonly visited by Tibetan pilgrims and traders before the invasion of Tibet by the Chinese when the borders were closed with India.
