= Jamyang Khyentse Wangpo =

Tibetan educator, scholar, and tertön (1820–1892)

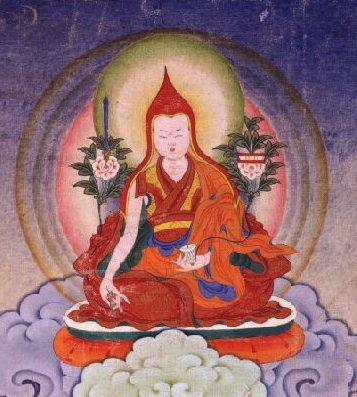
- Painting of Jamyang Khyentse Wangpo

Tibetan name
- Tibetan: འཇམ་དབྱངས་མཁྱེན་བརྩེའི་དབང་པོ
Transcriptions
- Wylie: 'jam dbyangs mkhyen brtse'i dbang po
- THL: Jamyang Khyentse Wangpo
- Tibetan Pinyin: Jamyang Kyênzê Wangbo
- Lhasa IPA: [tɕamtɕaŋ cʰẽtse waŋpo]

Chinese name
- Traditional Chinese: 妙吉祥智悲自在
- Simplified Chinese: 妙吉祥智悲自在
Transcriptions
Standard Mandarin
- Hanyu Pinyin: Miào Jíxiáng Zhìbēi Zìzài

Jamyang Khyentse Wangpo (Tibetan: འཇམ་དབྱངས་མཁྱེན་བརྩེའི་དབང་པོ, 1820–1892), also known by his tertön title, Pema Ösel Dongak Lingpa, was a teacher, scholar and tertön of 19th-century Tibet. He was a leading figure in the Rimé movement.

Having seen how the Gelug institutions pushed the other traditions into the corners of Tibet's cultural life, Jamyang Khyentse Wangpo and Jamgön Kongtrül Lodrö Thayé compiled together the teachings of the Sakya, Kagyu and Nyingma, including many near-extinct teachings, thus creating the Rimé movement. Without their collection and printing of rare works, the suppression of Buddhism by the Communists would have been much more final.

== Biography ==
Jamyang Khyentse Wangpo was born in 1820 on the 5th day of the 6th month of the Iron Dragon year of the 14th Rabjung, in the region of Yaru Khyungchen Drak in The Valley of Taerlung( treasure/spiritual)in Derge to a family named Dilgo of Dilgo village, Kham. His father was Rinchen Namgyal, the secretary of the king of Derge belonging to the Nyö clan, and a descendant of Drikung Changchub Lingpa. His mother Sönam Tso was a daughter of Gerab Nyerchen Göntse of the Sogmotsang family, from a Mongol background.

At twelve, he was recognized by Thartse Khenchen Jampa Kunga Tendzin as the incarnation of Jampa Namkha Chimé, and was given the name Jamyang Khyentse Wangpo Kunga Tenpé Gyaltsen Palzangpo. At twenty-one, he received full ordination from Minling Khenchen Rigdzin Zangpo at Mindrolling Monastery. In all, he had more than one hundred and fifty teachers, who were masters from all four major Tibetan Buddhist schools from the regions of Ü and Tsang as well as Kham, including Minling Trichen Gyurme Sangye Kunga, Shechen Gyurme Thutob Namgyal, Sakyapa Dorje Rinchen and the khenpo brothers of Thartse, Ngorpa Thartsé Khenpo Jampa Kunga Tendzin (1776–1862) and Thartsé Pönlop Naljor Jampal Zangpo (b. 1789).

In time, his fame spread throughout Tibet and he became known by the name of Pema Ösel Dongak Lingpa, and renowned as a holder of the seven special transmissions (ka bab dün).

== Disciples ==
His many disciples included Jamgön Kongtrul, Jamgon Ju Mipham Gyatso, Dodrupchen Jikmé Tenpé Nyima, Orgyen Chokgyur Lingpa, Tertön Sogyal, Ayu Khandro and many other masters of the Nyingma school; the Sakya Trizin Tashi Rinchen, the fourth Zimwock Rinpoche of Nalendra Monastery, many of the khenpos of Ngor and many other masters of the Sakya tradition; the fourteenth and fifteenth Karmapas, the tenth and eleventh Tai Situpas, Taklungma Rinpoche and other holders of the Kagyü teachings; Könchok Tenpa Rabgyé, the Nomihan of Drakyab, Lithang Khenchen Jampa Phuntsok, Horkhang Sar Gyalwa and other geshes of the Gelug tradition, and also followers of the Bon tradition.

== Tulkus ==
Several tulkus of Jamyang Khyentse Wangpo, including those of body (sku), speech (gsung), mind (thugs), qualities (yon tan) and activity (Wylie: 'phrin las), were recognized in Tibet. Of these, the body incarnation was Dzongsar Khyentse Jamyang Chökyi Wangpo, who was enthroned at Jamyang Khyentse Wangpo's main seat at Dzongsar Monastery but died in an accident c. 1909. The activity incarnation Dzongsar Khyentse Chökyi Lodrö, who was originally enthroned at Katok Monastery succeeded him. The speech incarnation was the Second Beru Khyentse and the mind incarnation Dilgo Khyentse. Since the early 1960s, Dilgo Khyentse, single-handedly upholding the unique tradition of Khyentse incarnations, propagated Buddhism tirelessly in India, Bhutan, Nepal, Tibet, and the West.

List of the immediate emanations of Jamyang Khyentse Wangpo:

- Sku
  - Dzongsar Khyentse Jamyang Chökyi Wangpo (1894?–1908)
  - Jamyang Chökyi Wangchug (1909–1960)
- Gsung
  - Karma Khyentse'i Ozer (1896–1945)
  - Second Beru Khyentse (Beru or Palpung Khyentse) (1946–)
- Thugs
  - Sakya Punpo Khyentse (1900–1950)
  - Dilgo Khyentse Rabsal Dawa (1910–1991)
  - Se Phagchog Dorje (1854–1919), a son of Togden Shakya Sri
- Yon tan
  - Dzogchen Khyentse Guru Tsewang (c. 1897 – c. 1945)
  - Nangchen Khyentse Kunzang Drodul (1897–1946)
- Phrin las
  - Katok Khyentse Jamyang Chökyi Lodro (1893–1959), later known as Dzongsar Khyentse Chökyi Lodrö

== Name variants ==
Alternate names by which Jamyang Khyentse Wangpo was known include: Dorje Zijitsal; Jigme Khyentse Nyugu; Khyentse Wangpo; Kunga Tenpai Gyeltsen Pelzangpo; Osel Dorje Tukchoktsal; Osel Tulpai Dorje; Pema Osel Do-ngag Linpa; Tsangse Gyepai Loden; Tsokye Lama Gyepaibang; Tsuglamawai Nyima Tsokye Shonnui Langtso.

== See also ==
- Simhamukha

== Sources ==
- Düjom Jikdrel Yéshé Dorjé (1988), The Nyingma School of Tibetan Buddhism: Its Fundamentals and History, translated by Dorje, Gyurme; Kapstein, Matthew, Wisdom Book Pub. Inc, ISBN 99953-1-140-2
- Smith, E. Gene (2001), Among Tibetan Texts: History and Literature of the Himalayan Plateau, Studies in Indian and Tibetan Buddhism, Sommerville MA: Wisdom Publications, ISBN 0-86171-179-3
- Orgyen Tobgyal Rinpoche (1996), The Life of Jamyang Khyentse Wangpo
- Tulku Thondup (1996), Masters of Meditation and Miracles, Shambhala, ISBN 1-57062-113-6
