= Shardza Tashi Gyaltsen =

Tibetan buddhist scholar

- ཤར་རྫ་བཀྲ་ཤིས་རྒྱལ་མཚན

Personal life
- Born: 1859
- Died: 1933/1935

Religious life
- Religion: Bon

Senior posting
- Based in: Tibet
- Students: Nyala Rinpoche Rigdzin Changchub Dorje

Shardza Tashi Gyaltsen (Tibetan: ཤར་རྫ་བཀྲ་ཤིས་རྒྱལ་མཚན, Wylie: shar rdza bkra shis rgyal mtshan) (1859–1933 or 1935) was a great Dzogchen master of the Bon tradition of Tibet who took not only Bon disciples, but gathered students from all traditions of Tibetan Buddhism.

== Biography ==
Shardza was born in 1859 in Kham. He took ordination at age 30. He wrote philosophical works and became an influential Bon scholar.

Shardza has been cited as a vegetarian as he refused to eat the meat of any animal that was slaughtered. However, Shardza would eat meat from animals that died naturally from accidents or attacked by wolves as the consumer has no involvement in the death of the animal.

According to tradition, Shardza Tashi Gyeltsen famously realized the rainbow body.

Chaoul (2006) opened the discourse of Bon traditions of Trul khor into Western scholarship in English with his thesis from Rice University, which makes reference to writings of Shardza Tashi Gyaltsen, particularly the Most Profound Heavenly Storehouse None Other than the Oral Transmission of Trul Khor Energy Control Practices (Wylie: yang zab nam mkha' mdzod chen las snyan rgyud rtsa rlung 'phrul 'khor).

== Literary works ==
- 'The Self-Dawning of the Three Bodies' (Tibetan: སྐུ་གསུམ་རང་ཤར, Wylie: sku gsum rang shar)
- byang zab nam mkha' mdzod chen las snyan rgyud rtsa rlung 'phrul 'khor (a Commentary on Trul Khor)

== See also ==
- Tapihritsa
- Tonpa Shenrab Miwoche
