= Rewalsar Lake =

Lake in Himachal Pradesh, India

Rewalsar Lake (Tso Pema)
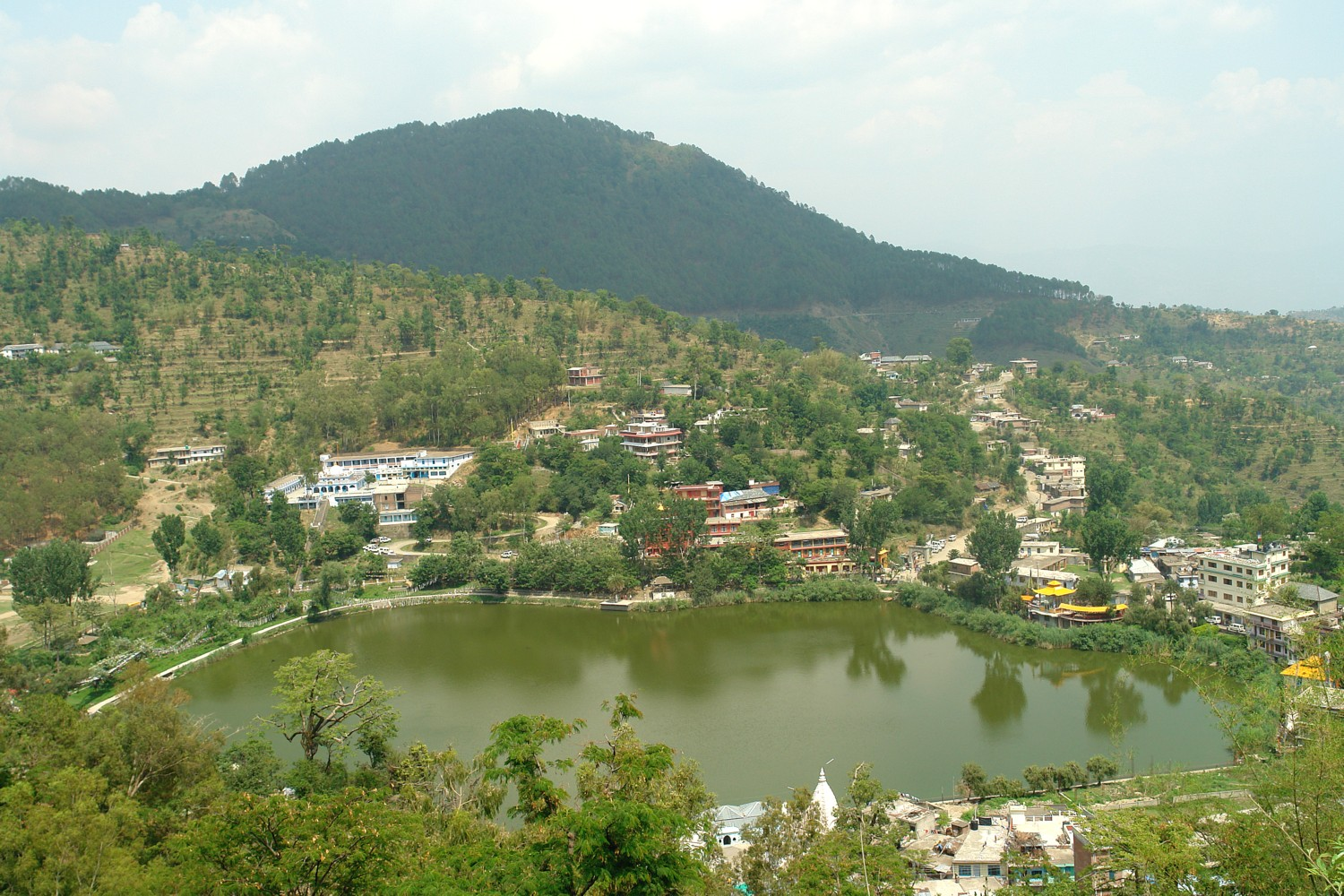
- Rewalsar lake

- Location within Himachal Pradesh Location within India
- Location: Mandi district, Himachal Pradesh, India
- Coordinates: 31.63389°N 76.83333°E
- Type: Mid altitude lake
- Basin countries: India
- Surface area: 160 square kilometres (62 sq mi)
- Average depth: 10–20 metres (33–66 ft)
- Max. depth: 25 metres (82 ft)
- Shore length^{1}: 735 m (2,411 ft)
- Surface elevation: 1,360 m (4,460 ft)
- Settlements: Rewalsar
- References: Himachal Pradesh Tourism Dept.
- ^{1} Shore length is not a well-defined measure.

Rewalsar Lake, also known as Tso Pema, is a mid-altitude lake located in the mountains of the Mandi district in Himachal Pradesh, India. It is located 22.5 km south-west from the town of Mandi, at an elevation of about 1,360 metres (4,460 ft) above sea level, with a shoreline of about 735 m. Rewalsar Lake is a sacred spot for Hindus, Sikhs and Buddhists, and sacred to Tibetan Buddhists for the Vajrayana practices of Padmasambhava and Mandarava, which are credited for the lake's creation.

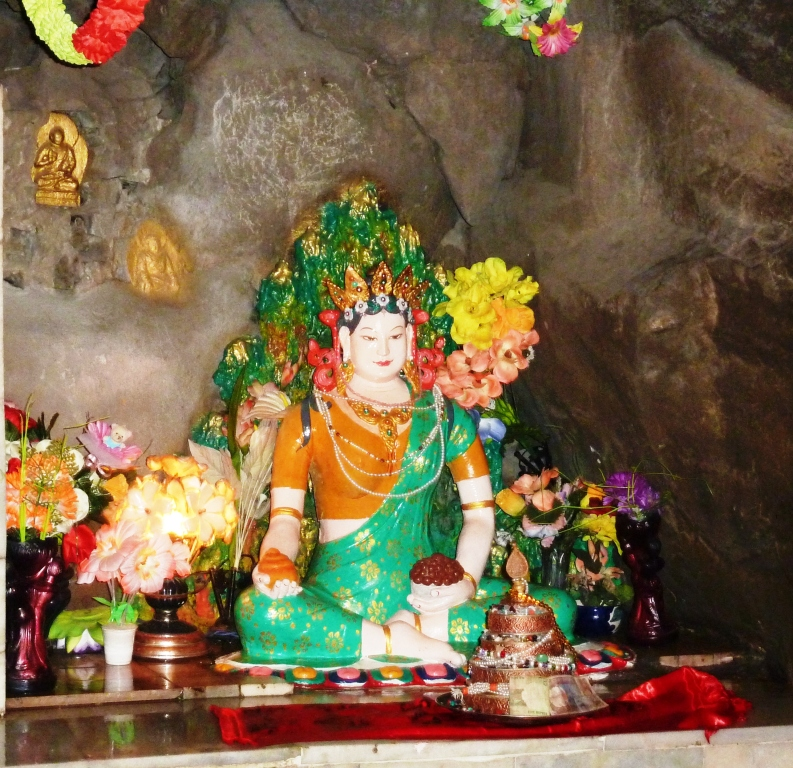
Shrine to Mandarava in cave above Lake Rewalsar.

There is a Colossus of Padmasambhava, a shrine to Mandarava, and three Buddhist monasteries at Rewalsar Lake. The Rewaksar Lake also has three Hindu temples, dedicated to Lord Krishna, Lord Shiva and to the sage Lomasha. Another holy lake, Kunt Bhyog, which is about 1,750 metres (5,740 ft) above sea level, lies above Rewalsar. It is associated with the escape of 'Pandavas' from the burning palace of wax—an episode from the epic Mahabharata.

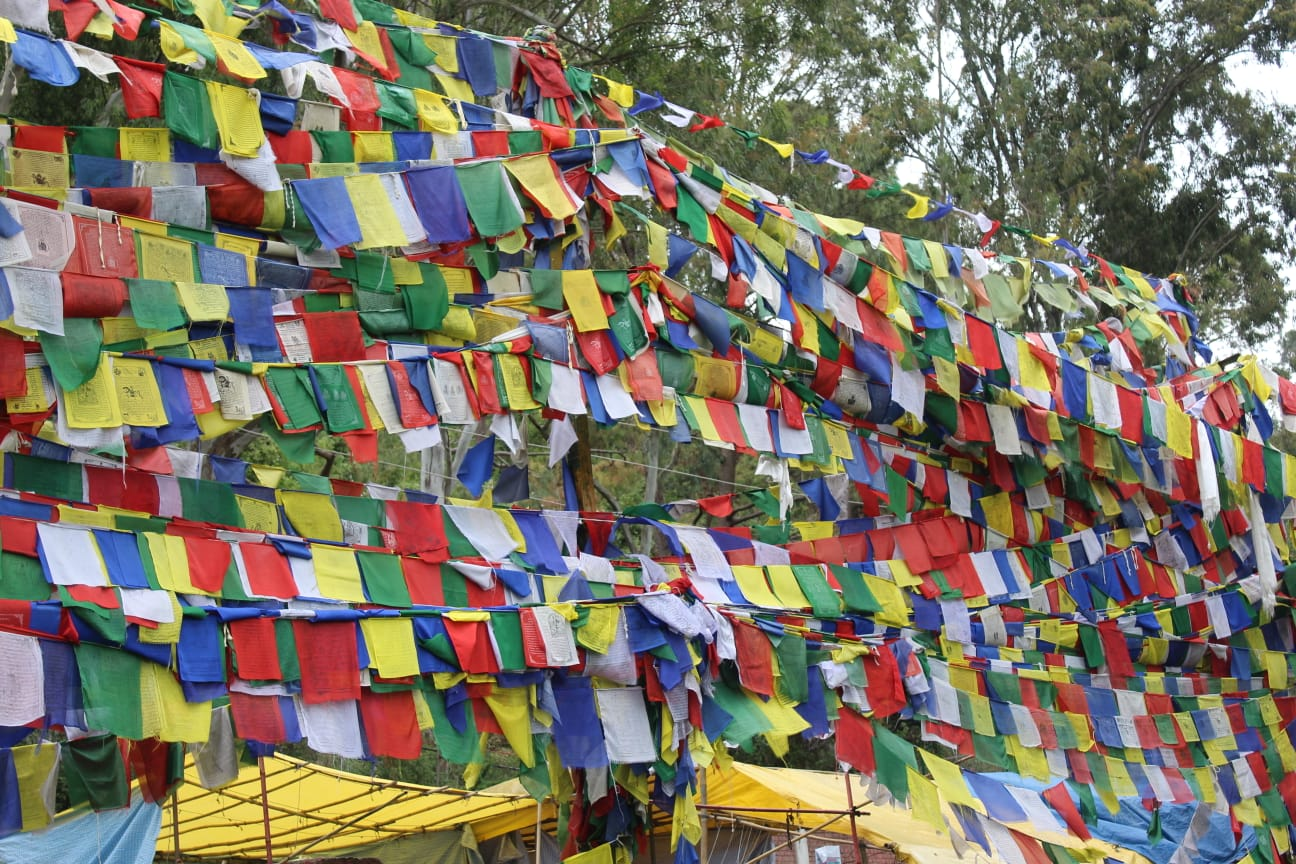
Buddhist Prayer Flags at Rewalsar lake, Mandi

After practicing with the local Relwasar king's daughter Mandarava, Padmasambhava and Mandarava departed for Nepal, from which Padmasambhava travelled to Tibet. Known to Tibetans as Guru Rinpoche (the "Precious Master"), Padmasambhava revealed the teachings of Vajrayana Buddhism in Tibet. There are islands of floating reed on Rewalsar lake and the spirit of Padmasambhava is said to reside in them. It is also here that the sage Lomas did penance in devotion to Lord Shiva; and, the Sikh Guru Gobind Singh (22 December 1666 – 7 October 1708), the tenth Guru of Sikhism, also resided here for one month.

The Sisu fair held in late February/early march, and the festival of Baisakhi are important events at Rewalsar.

== Legend of Padmasambhava and Princess Mandarava of Mandi (Zahor) ==
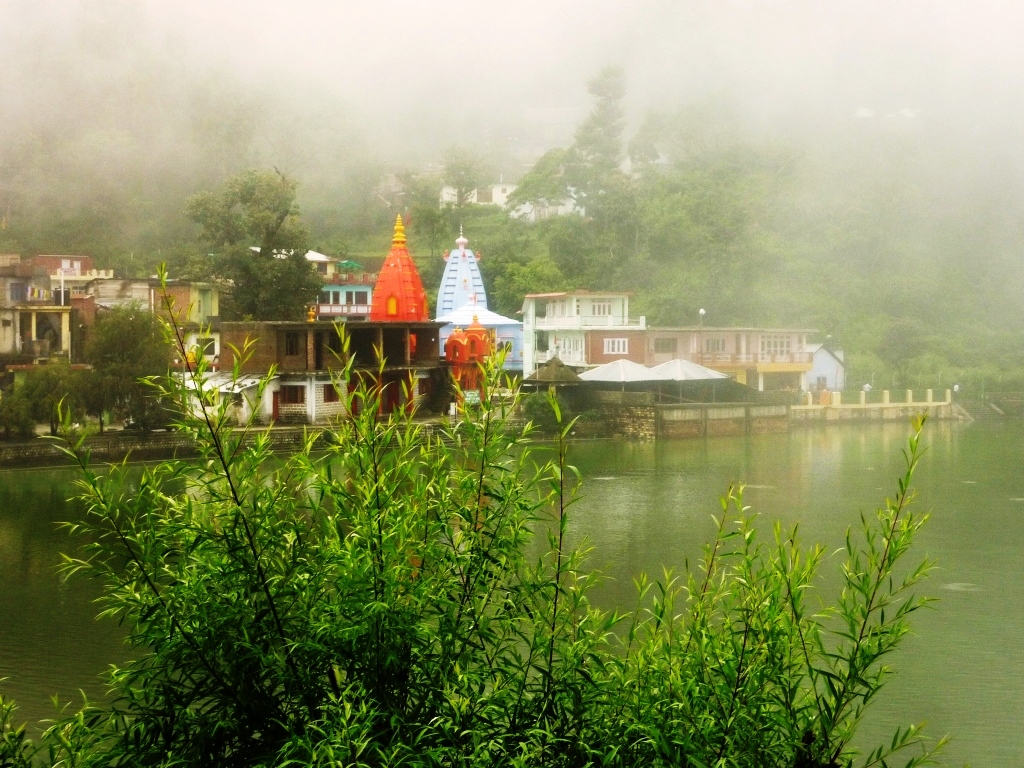
Morning mist, Lake Rewalsar

Mandarava and Padmasambhava were energetically drawn to one another. The local king Vihardhara, fearful of the contamination of the royal bloodline and what he perceived as Mandarava's apostasy, endeavoured to have Mandarava and Padmasambhava purified by immolation through the flames of a pyre. Instead of finding their corpses incensed and charred, Vihardhara finds that the fire of the pyre has been transformed into Lake Rewalsar, out of which arises a blooming lotus that supports the unharmed Mandarava and Padmasambhava who through this manifestation of their realisation have achieved their secret names of Vajravarahi and Hayagriva, respectively, after which Vihardhara furnishes the union with his unreserved blessings.

Legend has it that the great teacher Padmasambhava (Guru Rinpoche) used his enormous power to take flight to Tibet from Rewalsar. In Rewalsar, his spirit is said to reside in the tiny island of floating reed that drifts over the water.

== Colossus of Padmasambhava ==
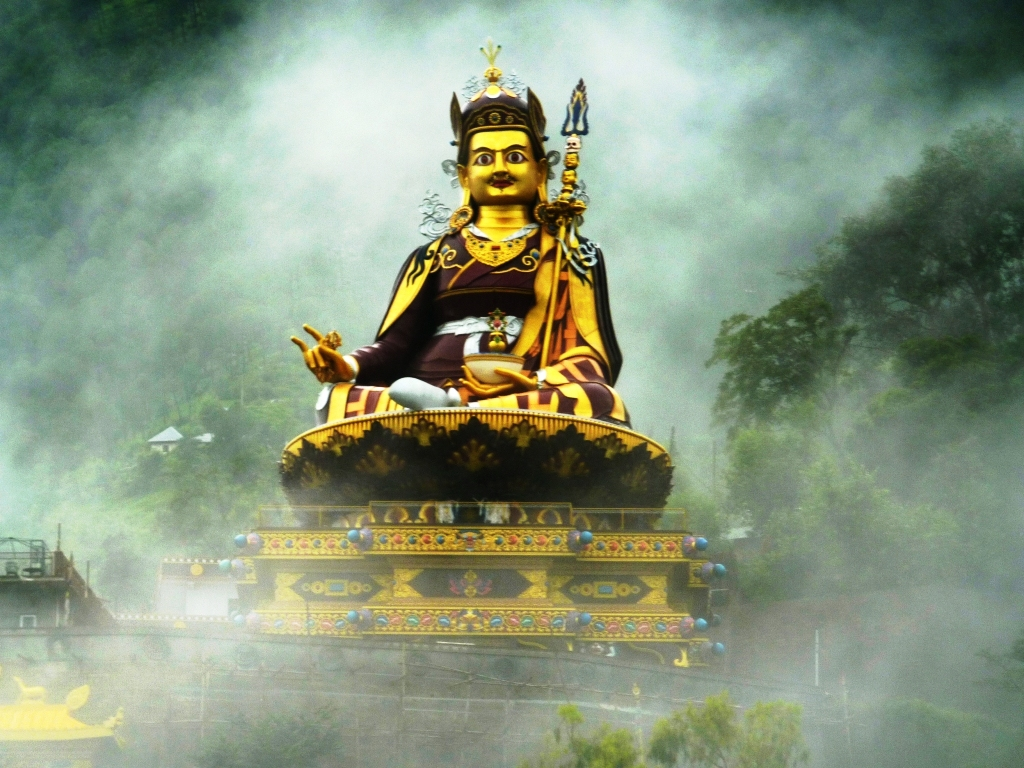
Statue of Padmasambhava above Rewalsar Lake (Tso Pema).

On April 1, 2012, a monumental statue of Padmasambhava, measuring 37.5 m (123 ft), was consecrated, blessed and inaugurated by the 14th Dalai Lama. The building project was spear-headed and overseen by Wangdor Rinpoche and funded by donations. It took nearly 10 years to complete, with the foundation alone taking three years.

The statue was constructed almost entirely by hand by tradespeople from the immediate Rewalsar area and by master artists from Nepal and Bhutan. It is made primarily of cement, layered by hand over a skeleton of iron rebar, while the walls are made of hand-cut stone. Bhutanese sculptors carved intricate details into the cement while still wet. It was then painted by masters from Nepal, who finished the delicate details by hand. The building's interior is filled with traditional dzong, tsa tsas, prayer flags and medicine pills made by local craftworkers.

== See also ==
- Rewalsar, India, a village located beside the lake
