= Himalayan Art Resources =

The Himalayan Art Resources (HAR) website is a virtual museum of Himalayan and Tibetan art, cataloging and exhibiting images of paintings, sculptures, textiles, ritual objects, murals, and other art from museums, universities and private collections throughout the world.

== History ==
Himalayan Art Resources started out as a digital library known as the Tibet Art Project. The website was created with funding from the Shelley & Donald Rubin Foundation in 1997, as an education and research database of Himalayan Art. Since 1998, Jeff Watt, a Himalayan and Tibetan art scholar, has been the director and chief Curator of the HAR website.

By 2013, the website included about 45,000 images from public and private collections; this number of images more than doubled by 2018, and included images from about 1000 collections and repositories.

Scholars of Himalayan art make regular use of the web site during their research. The site also makes available hundreds of resources for educational and interpretation purposes. These include curriculum, essays, glossaries, and organizational outlines to help users navigate the material on the site.
