= Tare Lhamo =

Tibetan Buddhist teacher (1938–2002)

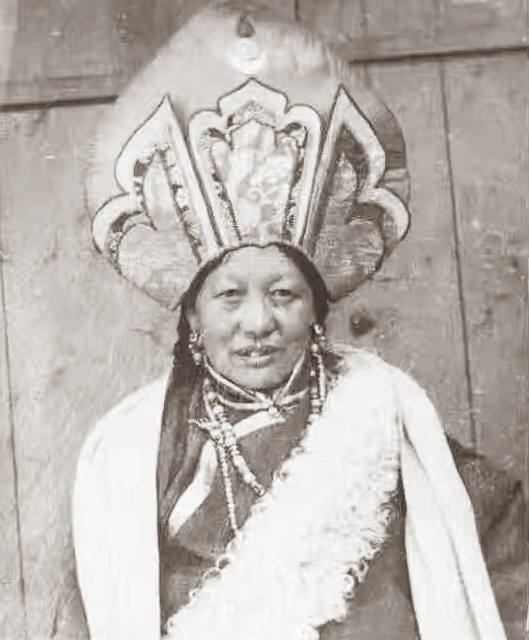
- Photograph of Khandro Tāre Lhamo

Tibetan name
- Tibetan: ཏཱ་རེ་ལྷ་མོ།
Transcriptions
- Wylie: tA re lha mo
- THL: taré lhamo

Tāre Lhamo, a.k.a. Tāre Dechen Gyalmo (1938–26 March 2002), was a Tibetan Buddhist master, visionary, and treasure revealer (gter ston) who gained renown in eastern Tibet. She was especially praised for her life-saving miracles during the hardships of the Cultural Revolution and for extending the life-span of many masters. Local legends claim that her activities to benefit others swelled like a lake in spring.

According to Tulku Orgyen Zangpo Rinpoche, one of her treasures was tying different types of knots with string as a skillful means to fulfill wishes or activities to benefit others.

== Early life ==
=== Biographies ===
Spiraling Vine of Faith: The Life of Liberation of the Supreme Khandro Tare Lhamois the official biography of her early life written by Pema Osal Thaye, a heart-son of Namtrul Rinpoche and Tare Lhamo.

Another biography is Jewel Lamp of Blessings (gter ston grub pa'i dbang phyug gzhi chen nam sprul dang mhka' 'dro tva re bde chen lha mo zung gi mdzad rnam nyer bsdud byin rlabs norbu'i sgron me), written by Abu Karlo and published in 2001.

After Tare Lhamo's marriage to Namtrul Rinpoche, her biography is continued in Pema Osal Thaye's biography of Namtrul Rinpoche, Jewel Garland: The Life of Liberation of Namtrul Jigme Phuntsok.

=== Later youth and familial ties ===
At age fourteen, Tāre Lhamo and her mother were traveling by foot to Dodrupchen Monastery when a pack of wild dogs attacked them in an open field. They threw stones at the dogs, including one dark stone that Tare Lhamo picked up from the top of a boulder. Later that night, when she went to bed, she found that dark stone in her jacket. On closer examination, it was a treasure casket marked with the syllable of Yeshe Tsogyal. Her mother understood once again that her daughter was an emanation of Yeshe Tsogyal and told her, "This stone is very important. You must wear it next to your body." Tāre Lhamo placed it inside a locket and wore it at all times. She later learned that it contained a treasure destined to be revealed by Dodrupchen Rigdzin Jalu Dorje and she offered it to him.

When she was 19, Tāre Lhamo was advised to marry Tulku Mingyur Dorje (1934–1959), an alleged reincarnation of Vairocana and the son of Dzongter Kunzang Nyima.

== Teachers ==
In 1990, from Dola Tulku Jigme Chökyi Nyima Rinpoche, one of Dudjom Rinpoche's sons who remained in Tibet, Tāre Lhamo and Namtrul Rinpoche received the complete cycle of the Dudjom New Treasures. Later she recognized his son as a rebirth of Dudjom Jigdral Yeshe Dorje.

== During the Cultural Revolution ==
At age 22, Tāre Lhamo was caught up in the Cultural Revolution. In eastern Tibet, religious institutions were destroyed and practicing Buddhism was banned.

During the Cultural Revolution, Tāre Lhamo was subjected to manual labor. Her first husband, Tulku Mingyur Dorje, and her three brothers all died in prison. According to stories passed down by mouth, she was spared imprisonment, but endured beatings and torture. On one occasion, officials placed her bare chest on a hot wood-burning stove.

== Life with Namtrul Rinpoche ==
=== 1978–1988 ===
During the 80s and 90s, Tāre Lhamo and Namtrul Rinpoche guided and taught many people throughout Eastern Tibet, freely disseminating the treasures of Dudjom, Apang Terton, and their own. According to Tulku Orgyen Zangpo Rinpoche, when revealing their treasures, it was customary for Tāre Lhamo to write in a symbolic script and for Namtrul Rinpoche to transcribe the symbols.

== Final years ==
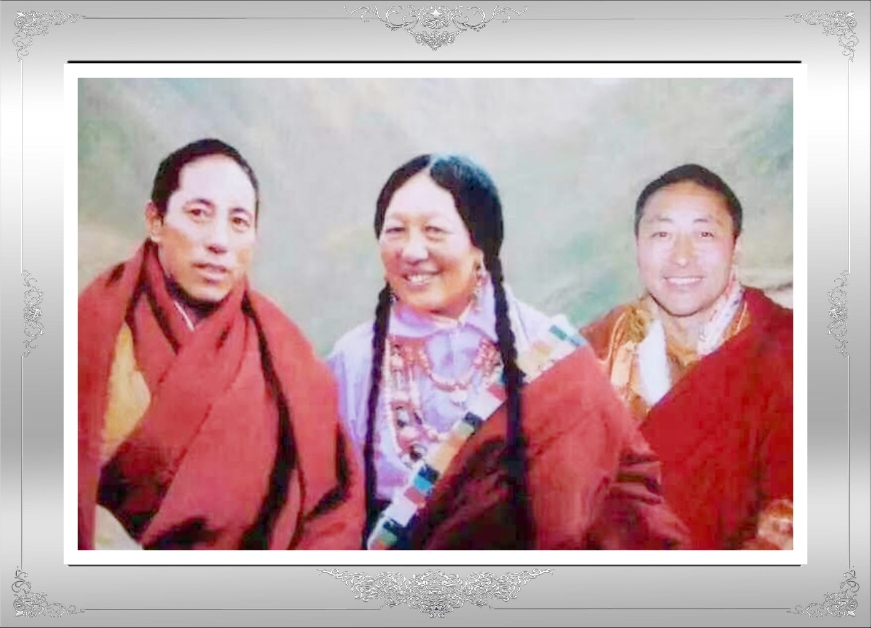
Namtrul Rinpoche, Khandro Tare Lhamo, Tulku Lhaksam Namdak

Tāre Lhamo died on March 26, 2002, in a Chengdu hospital. She had been healthy and strong throughout her life. However, according to Tulku Orgyen Zangpo Rinpoche, in 2000, she started feeling that she would soon die.
