= Rainbow body =

Level of realization within Tibetan Buddhism

In Dzogchen, rainbow body (Tibetan: འཇའ་ལུས་, Wylie: 'ja' lus, Jalü or Jalus) is a level of realization where the physical body transmutes into light and vanishes. This may or may not be accompanied by the 'rainbow body phenomenon'. The rainbow body phenomenon is pre-Buddhist in origin and is related to the indigenous Tibetan Bon religion. It is a topic which has been treated fairly seriously in Tibet for centuries past and into the modern era. Other Vajrayana teachings also mention rainbow body phenomena which occur during or after the dying process.

== Rigpa ==
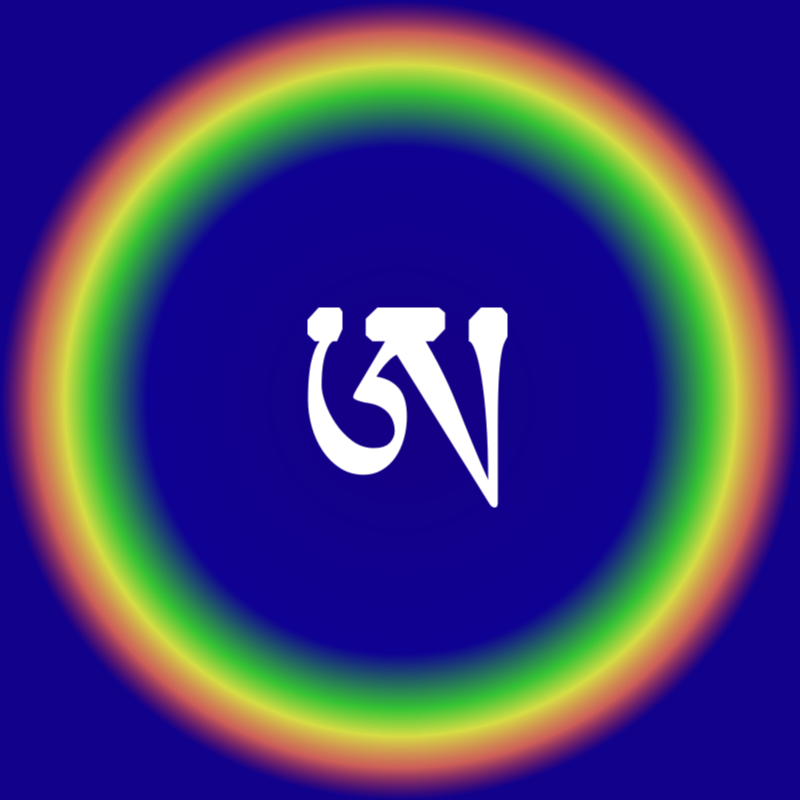
Tibetan letter "A" inside a thigle. The "A", which corresponds to the sound 'ahh', represents kadag while the thigle represents lhun grub.

The rainbow body phenomenon is a third person perspective of someone else attaining complete knowledge (Tibetan: རིག་པ, Wylie: rigpa). Knowledge is the absence of delusion and clinging regarding the display (visions) of the basis.

Rigpa has three wisdoms, which are kadag, lhun grub and thugs rje. Kadag deals with trekchö. The lhun grub aspect has to do with esoteric practices, such as (but not limited to) tögal, that self-liberate the human body into a Sambhogakāya (rainbow body phenomenon). The symbol of Dzogchen is a Tibetan "A" wrapped in a thigle. The "A" represents kadag while the thigle represents lhun grub. The third wisdom, thugs rje (compassion), is the inseparability of the previous two wisdoms.

In Dzogchen, the fundamental point of practice to attain the rainbow body is to distinguish rigpa (natural state) from sems (mind).

The ultimate fruition of the tögal practices is a body of pure light and the dissolution of the physical body at death, this is called a rainbow body (Wylie 'ja' lus, pronounced ja lü.) If the four visions of tögal are not completed before death, then during death, from the point of view of an external observer, the dying person starts to shrink until he or she disappears or "vanish into light". Usually fingernails, toenails and hair are left behind (see e.g. Togden Ugyen Tendzin, Ayu Khandro, Changchub Dorje).

The attainment of the rainbow body is typically accompanied by the appearance of lights and rainbows around the body.

Exceptional practitioners are held to realize a higher type of rainbow body without leaving behind "the hair or fingernails" or dying, a state named the Rainbow Body of Great Transference, or jalu powa chemo. Having completed the four visions before death, the individual focuses on the lights that surround the fingers. His or her physical body self-liberates into a non-material body of light (a Sambhogakāya) with the ability to exist and abide wherever and whenever as pointed by one's compassion.

== Eyewitness account ==
Shardza Tashi Gyaltsen's Heart Drops of Dharmakaya, a Kunzang Nyingtik Dzogchen meditation manual commentated on by Lopon Tenzin Namdak, contains an eyewitness account of his main students' bodies shrinking and rainbows appearing in the sky at death.

== Reported accomplishments ==
- Shardza Tashi Gyaltsen (1935)
- Sodnam Namgyal (1952)
- Ayu Khandro (1953)
- Togden Ugyen Tendzin (1962)
- Khenpo A-chos (1998)

== See also ==
- Tukdam – Buddhist post-mortem meditation
