= Lomasha =

Sage in Hinduism

- Other names: Romasha
- Affiliation: Rishi
- Texts: Mahabharata, Puranas

Lomasha (Sanskrit: लोमश, romanized: Lomaśa) is a sage featured in Hindu texts. He is most prominently featured in the Mahabharata, where he narrates a number of legends to the Pandavas during their period of exile in the forest.

== Literature ==
=== Mahabharata ===
In the Mahabharata, Lomasha is described to have visited Indraloka to pay his respects to Indra. He observed the Pandava Arjuna seated upon half of the deity's throne. Indra explained to the sage that Arjuna shared the throne with him due to the virtue of being his son, and described the circumstances of the prince's birth and identity. He instructed the sage to return to earth, to the forest of Kamyaka, and offer Yudhishthira reassurance that his brother would return to him after gaining celestial weapons, and ask him to bathe in pilgrimage sites along with the other Pandavas. The deity also bade the sage to protect Yudhishthira from the rakshasas that resided in the forest. Accordingly, Lomasha visited Yudhishthira and conveyed the aforementioned message of Indra, and offered to accompany him during his pilgrimage. Hearing Yudhishthira's grievances about the success of his unrighteous foes, Lomasha preached to the prince regarding the nature of dharma. Citing the example of the superiority of the devas over the asuras, the sage assured him that those who did not adhere to dharma would be destroyed. The sage regaled the tales of a number of personages to the Pandavas, such as those of Agastya, Rama, Parashurama, and Rishyashringa. He accompanied them during their visits to a number of holy sites such as the Naimisha forest, Gaya, and the river Yamuna, and explained their significance to them.

The legend of Indra slaying Vritra is narrated by Lomasha.

=== Padma Purana ===
In the Padma Purana, the legend of Lomasha coming across five maidens of the gandharva race who had fallen in love with the son of a sage is described by Narada. The young man rejected their advances, and when they attempted to claim him by force, he turned them into pishachas, and they responded in kind. Feeling sorry for their plights, the sage had them bathe in the holy waters of the Narmada river, which returned them to their original forms. Lomasha advised the young man to take the five maidens as his wives and live together by the banks of the river.

=== Skanda Purana ===
In the Skanda Purana, Lomasha narrates a number of legends, such as that of the Samudra Manthana and the conflict between the asuras, led by Virochana, and the devas, led by Indra.

=== Tulasi Ramayana ===
In the Tulasi Ramayana, Lomasha is stated to have once engaged in a discourse on the merits of nirguna (non-qualified Absolute) worship over that of saguna (qualified Absolute) worship of Brahman. The sage Bhushundi refused to accept these views. In his fury, Lomasha cursed him to become a crow, thus being renamed Kakabhushandi.
