= Tertön =

Tibetan Buddhist master

In Tibetan Buddhism, a Tertön (Tibetan: གཏེར་སྟོན་, Wylie: gter ston) is a person who is a discoverer of ancient hidden texts or terma. Many tertöns are considered to be incarnations of the twenty five main disciples of Padmasambhava (Guru Rinpoche), who foresaw a dark time in Tibet. He and his consort Yeshe Tsogyal hid teachings to be found in the future to benefit beings. A vast system of transmission lineages developed. Scriptures from the Nyingma school were updated by terma discoveries, and terma teachings have guided many Tibetan Bon and Buddhist practitioners.

The termas are sometimes objects like statues, and can also exist as dharma texts and experiences. Tertöns discover the texts at the right time and place. The teachings can be relatively simple transmissions as well as entire meditation systems. Termas are found in rocks, water and the minds of incarnations of Guru Rinpoche's students.

== Prominent Nyingma tertöns ==
According to generally accepted history, the rediscovering of terma began with the first tertön, Sangye Lama (1000–1080).

=== The Five Tertön Kings ===
Throughout the centuries, many Nyingmapas were known as tertöns. Five of them were widely recognized as very important ones and called the "five tertön kings":

1. Nyangral Nyima Özer (1124–1192)
2. Guru Chöwang (1212–1270), also known as Guru Chökyi Wangchuk
3. Dorje Lingpa (1346–1405)
4. Pema Lingpa (1445/50–1521)
5. Jamyang Khyentse Wangpo (1820–1892)
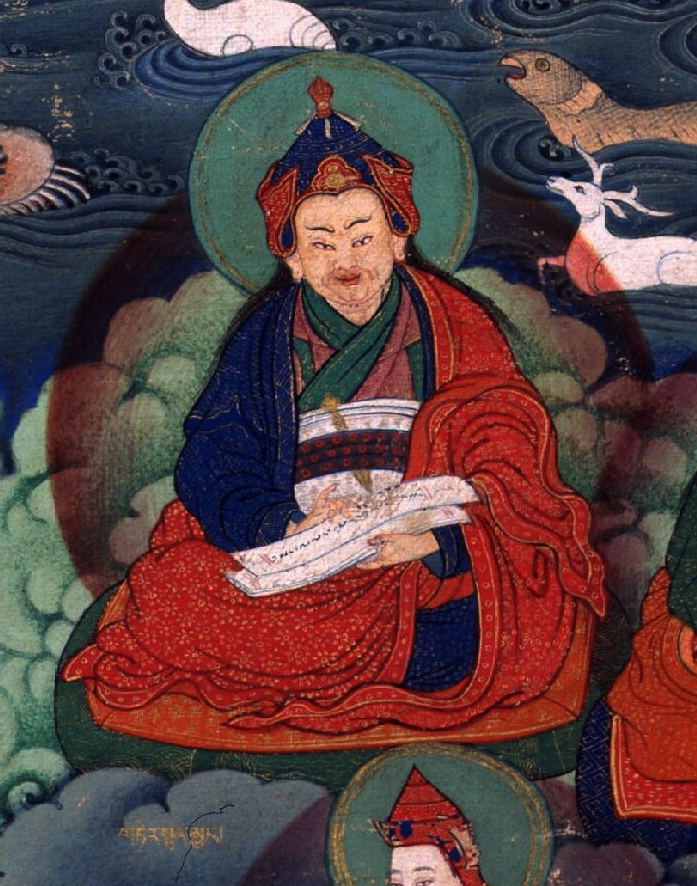
Nyangrel Nyima Ozer

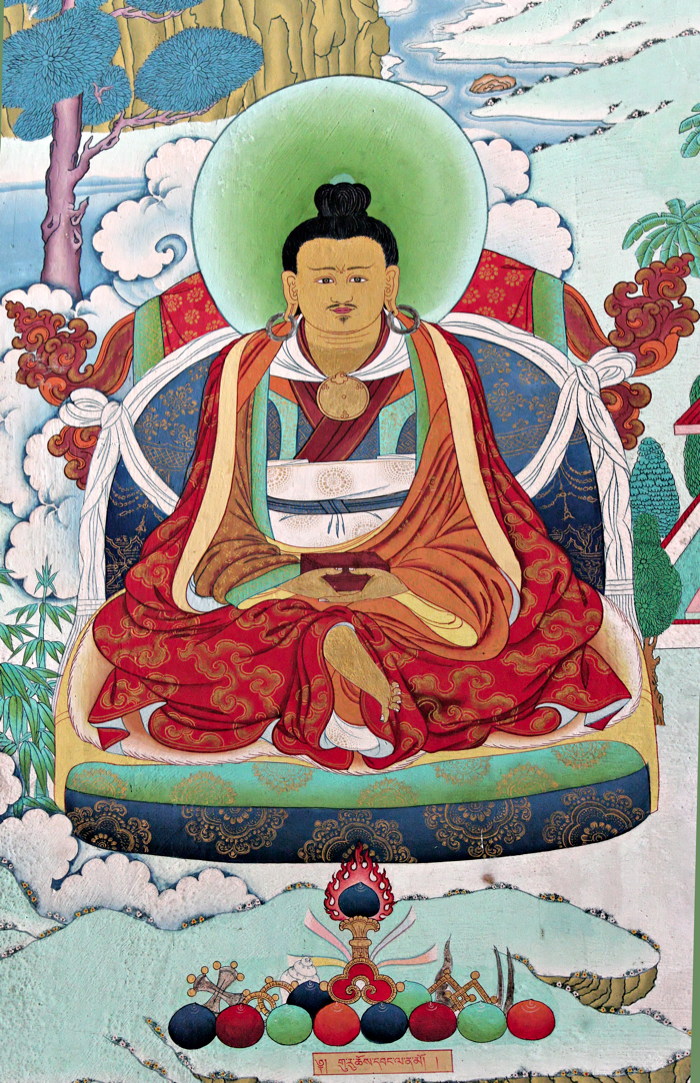
Guru Chöwang

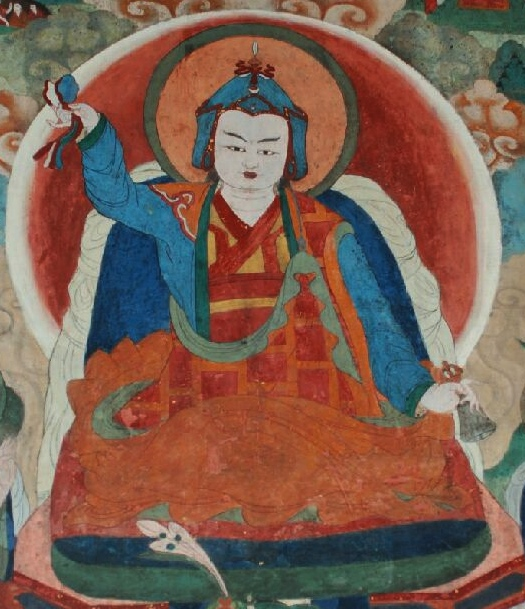
Dorje Lingpa

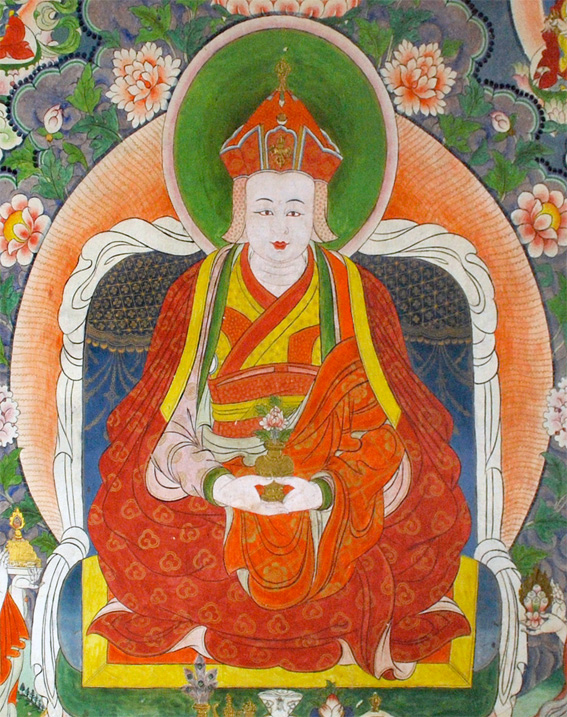
Pema Lingpa

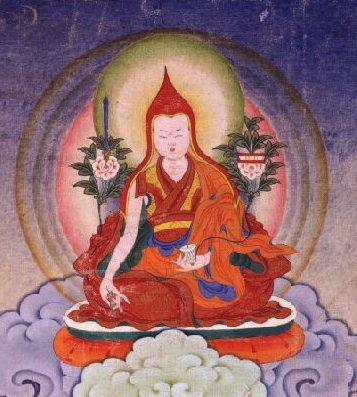
Jamyang Khyentse Wangpo

=== Female Tertöns ===
Some influential female tertöns have all been considered to be emanations of Yeshe Tsogyal:

- Jomo Menmo (13th century), the consort of Guru Chöwang
- Mingyur Paldrön
- Sera Khandro (1892–1940)

Other influential female tertöns include:

- Tāre Lhamo (1938–2003)
- Ayu Khandro (Long Life Dakini, 1839–1953)
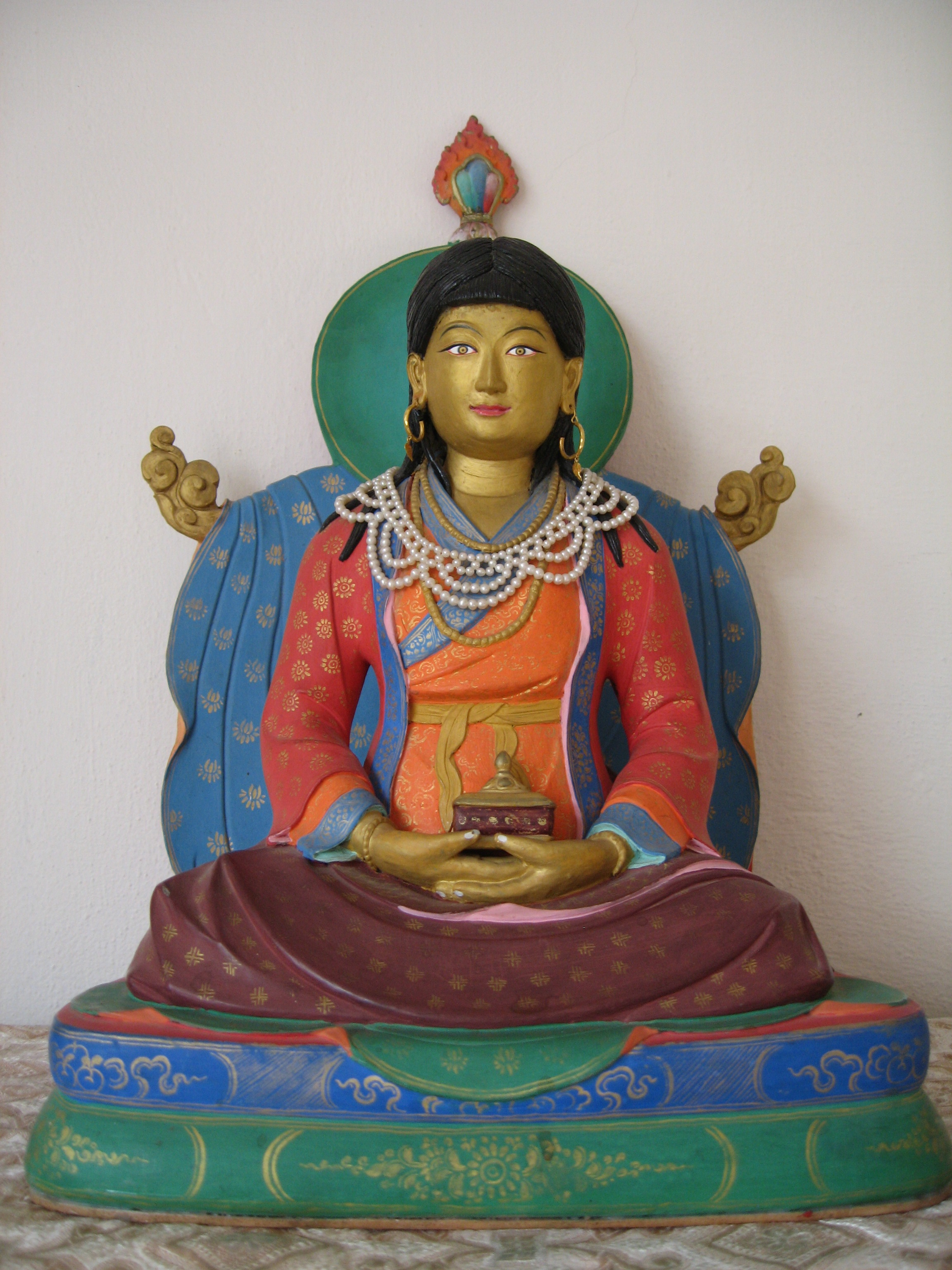
Sera Khandro

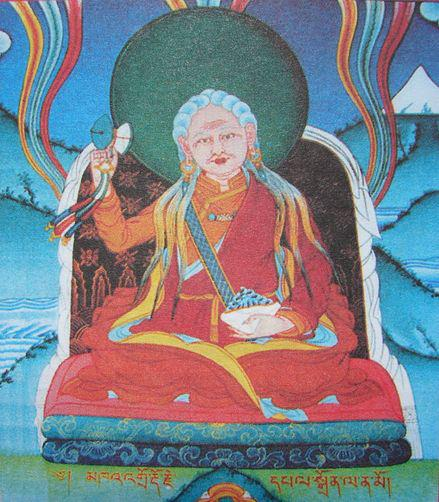
Ayu Khandro

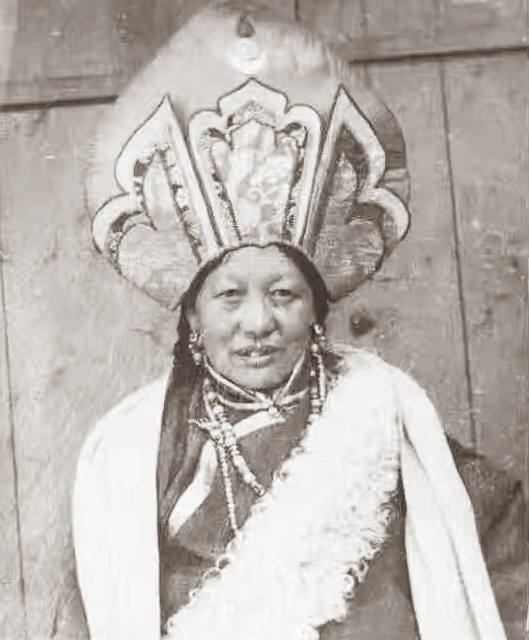
Tare Lhamo

=== Other Nyingma tertöns ===
Other important Nyingma tertöns include:

- Zhangtön Tashi Dorjé (1097–1167), revealed the Vima Nyingthig
- Rinchen Lingpa (1295–1375)
- Sangye Lingpa (1340–1396)
- Rigdzin Gödem (1307–1408), revealed the Northern Treasures
- Karma Lingpa (14th. century), revealed the Kar-gling zhi-khro, which includes the Bardo Thödrol
- Thangtong Gyalpo (1385–1510)
- Ratna Lingpa (1403–1471)
- Kunkyong Lingpa (1408–1489)
- Tennyi Lingpa Padma Tsewang Gyalpo (1480–1535)
- Lhatsün Namkha Jikmé (1597 – c. 1650)
- Jatsön Nyingpo (1585–1656), revealed the Könchok Chidü
- Namchö Mingyur Dorje (1645–1667), known for the Namchö (Sky Dharma)
- Terdak Lingpa (1646–1714)
- Jigme Lingpa (1729–1798), known for the Longchen Nyingthig
- Orgyen Chokgyur Lingpa (1829–1870)
- Dudjom Lingpa (1835–1904), revealed part of the Dudjom Tersar
- Dudjom Jigdral Yeshe Dorje (10 June 1904 – 17 January 1987), reincarnation of Dudjom Lingpa, revealed part of the Dudjom Tersar
- Jigme Phuntsok (1933 – 7 January 2004)
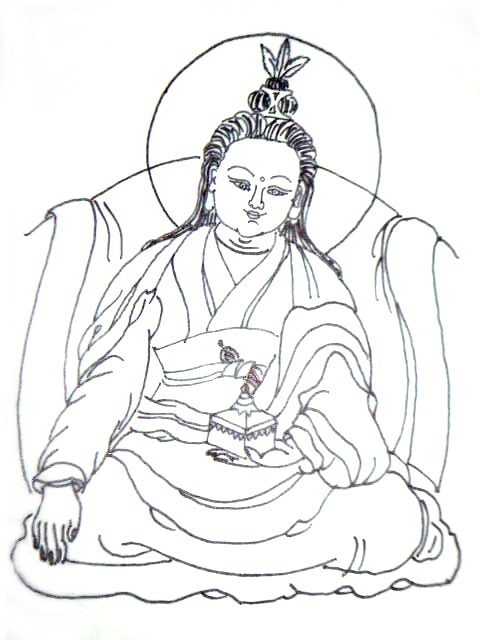
Ridzin Gödem

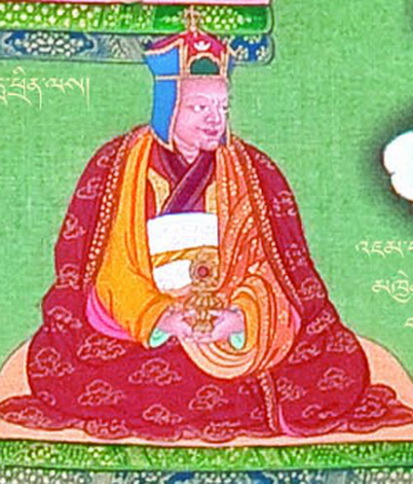
Ratna Lingpa

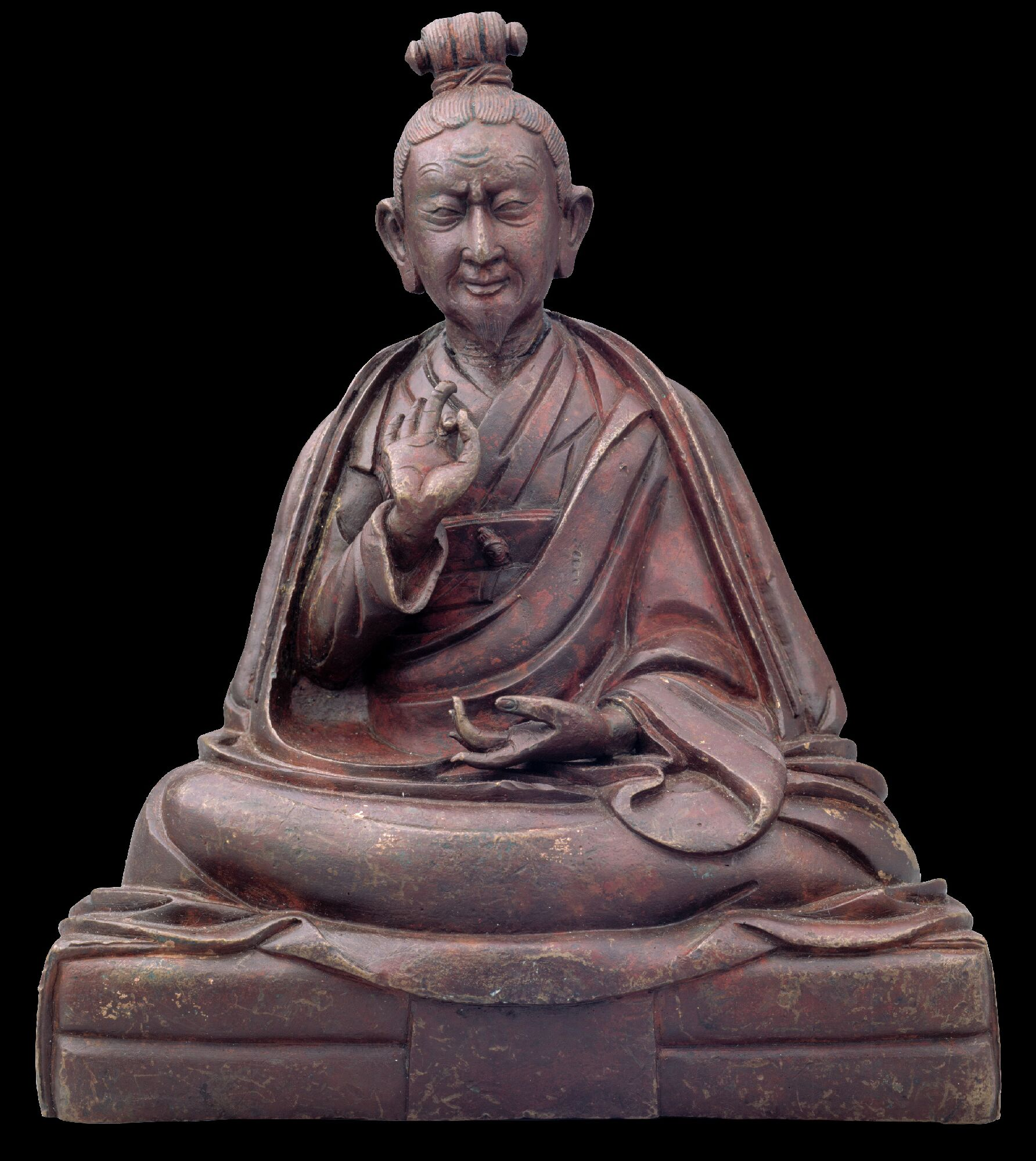
Jigme Lingpa

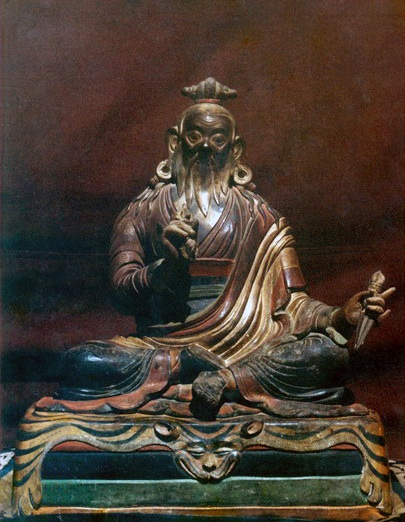
Dudjom Lingpa

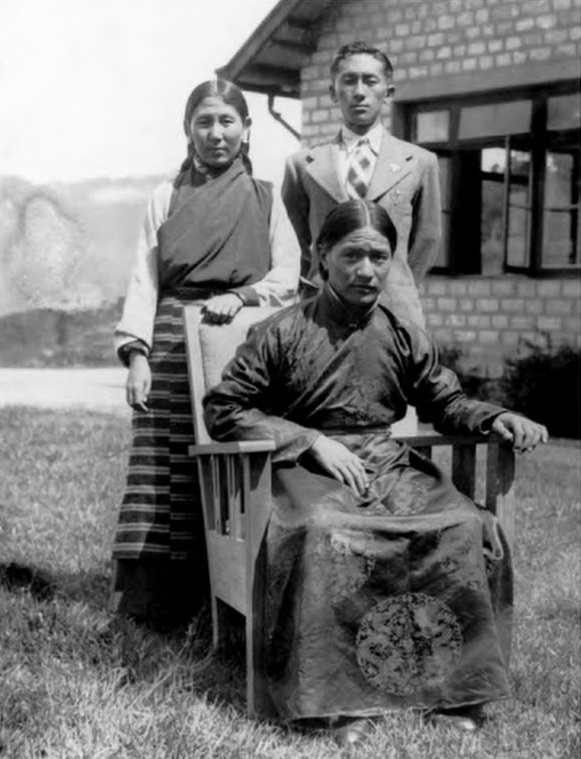
Dudjom Rinpoche

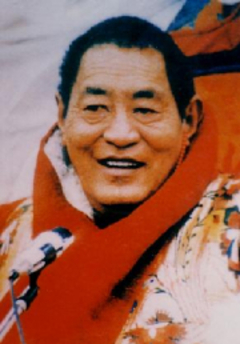
Jigme Phuntsok

== In other Tibetan Buddhist schools ==
The 15th Karmapa Khakyab Dorje of the Karma Kagyu Lineage was a tertön. There was a prophecy from Yeshe Tsogyal that he should take tantric consorts. Initially, he wished to stay a monk, but his health was failing. Meditation masters told him he would die if he didn't fulfill his functions as a tertön. In 1892, he was convinced to marry when he was 20 years old. By the time the 15th karmapa died, he had accumulated 40 boxes of termas, texts and objects.

Another noteworthy tertön is Tsangpa Gyare, founder of the Drukpa Lineage (12th century).

The Drikung Kagyu also have a Dzogchen terma tradition, the Yangzab Dzogchen, based on termas revealed by Rinchen Phuntsog (16th century).

The 5th Dalai Lama was a tertön who revealed a Dzogchen terma cycle through his pure visions known as the Sangwa Gyachen (Bearing the Seal of Secrecy). The Fifth Lelung Jedrung, Lobzang Trinle (1697–1740) was also a terton.

== Tertön practices ==
Consorts, with whom they practice sexual yoga or karmamudra to accelerate and enhance their capacity for realization, are thought to be very important to tertöns. Fremantle (2001: p. 19) states that:

One of the special requirements for the discovery of termas is the inspiration of the feminine principle, just as it was necessary for their concealment. The great majority of tertöns have been men, and generally they are accompanied by their wives or female companions (who need not necessarily have a sexual relationship with them). Alternatively, something representing the tertön's complementary energy, whether male or female, must be present.

Yet, even very realized female practitioners bring forth terma, sometimes with a living male consort and sometimes alone. Dakini Sera Khandro is a notable example of a woman tertön.

Although the authenticity and value of a terma may be questioned or debated, tertöns are exempt from being judged according to their behavior and lifestyle, with Guru Rinpoche having cautioned that "hidden enlightened beings appear in uncertain form" and, by contrast, "fool-deceivers are great hypocritical mimics of the dharmic practitioner".
