= Kyabgön Phakchok Rinpoche =

Tibetan Buddhist abbot

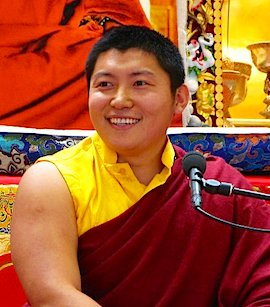
- Title: Tulku; Rinpoche

Personal life
- Born: May 1981 Nepal
- Education: Dzongsar Shedra

Religious life
- Religion: Buddhism
- School: Vajrayana
- Lineage: Taklung Kagyu and Nyingma

Senior posting
- Based in: Nepal
- Predecessor: Ngawang Jigmey Drakpa Thupten Namgyal
- Website: https://www.phakchokrinpoche.org

Phakchok Rinpoche (born 1981) is a teacher of the Nyingma lineage and chief lineage holder of the Taklung Kagyu lineage of Tibetan Buddhism. He is Vajra Master of Ka-Nying Shedrup Ling monastery, abbot of several monasteries in Nepal, and assists monasteries and practice centers in Tibet. In addition, he serves as Director of the Chokgyur Lingpa Foundation, a nonprofit organization engaged in a wide range of humanitarian projects.

== Background ==
Phakchok Rinpoche is the first-born grandson of Tulku Urgyen Rinpoche, and his father, Tsikey Chokling Rinpoche, was the fourth reincarnation of Terchen Chokgyur Lingpa. His mother is Sangyum Dechen Paldon. His uncles Chokyi Nyima Rinpoche, Tsoknyi Rinpoche, and Mingyur Rinpoche are active teachers in Asia and the West.

Phakchok Rinpoche oversees the Chokgyur Lingpa Foundation along with an international network of Buddhist meditation centers.

== Early life ==
Before he was four, Phakchok Rinpoche was recognized by the Kagyu regents as being seventh in the line of the Riwoche Phakchok incarnations. Rinpoche entered the Dzongsar Institute of Advanced Buddhist Studies in Bir, India, where he received the Khenpo title, comparable to a PhD in Buddhist Philosophy, from Dzongsar Khyentse Rinpoche and the 14th Dalai Lama. Phakchok Rinpoche has received instructions and ripening empowerments from many teachers, including Dilgo Khyentse Rinpoche, Tulku Urgyen Rinpoche, Chogye Trichen Rinpoche, Taklung Tsetrul Rinpoche, Trulshik Rinpoche, Nyoshul Khen Rinpoche, Tsikey Chokling Rinpoche, and others.

== Current work ==
Phakchok Rinpoche has a growing number of centers and Dharma groups around the world as well as students in over fifty countries including Malaysia, United States, Poland, Singapore, Hong Kong, Indonesia, Taiwan, Thailand, Germany, Canada, Mexico, Brazil, Austria, Scotland, Great Britain and Israel. In the United States, his main retreat center is Rangjung Yeshe Gomde Cooperstown in upstate New York.

Through his various foundations, Phakchok Rinpoche directs a number of projects, including a Monastic Education Fund that serves monks in two monasteries in the Kathmandu Valley, the Vajra Varahi Healthcare Clinic in Kathmandu, and dental and medical camps to serve remote areas of Nepal with the help of doctors from Singapore, Malaysia and Germany. Phakchok Rinpoche sits on the board of the non-profit organisation Rangjung Yeshe Shenpen, also based in Nepal.

In addition, Phakchok Rinpoche supports the translation and publication of Buddhist texts through the Lhasey Lotsawa translation group, which focuses especially on the teachings of the Chokling Tersar and the Taklung Kagyu traditions.

== Publications ==
- In the Footsteps of Bodhisattvas: Buddhist Teachings on the Essence of Meditation, Shambala Publications (October 27, 2020)
- Radically Happy: A User's Guide to the Mind, Shambala Publications (October 2018)
- Eightfold Supreme Path of Mind Training, Lhasey Lotsawa Publications (December 4, 2012)
- Keys to Happiness and a Meaningful Life, Lhasey Lotsawa Publications (June 27, 2012)
