= John D. Dunne =

American author and professor of Buddhist Studies

- Born: 15 May 1961 (age 65); New York City
- Occupation: Professor of Buddhist philosophy
- Website: www.johnddunne.net

John D. Dunne (born 1961) is the Distinguished Chair in Contemplative Humanities through the Center for Investigating Healthy Minds at the University of Wisconsin-Madison. He also holds a co-appointment in the Department of East Asian Languages and Literature. Until January 2016, he was Associate Professor in the Department of Religion and the Graduate Division of Religion at Emory University.

== Education and career ==
Dunne went to Amherst College and received his Ph.D. in the Study of Religion from Harvard University in 1999. According to his faculty profile, his work "focuses on Buddhist philosophy and contemplative practice, especially in dialog with Cognitive Science. His publications range from technical works on Buddhist epistemology to broader works on the nature of Buddhist contemplative practices such as Mindfulness." He occasionally teaches for Buddhist communities, most notably the Upaya Institute and Zen Center. He was a student of Tulku Urgyen Rinpoche and now studies with Tulku Urgyen's sons Chökyi Nyima Rinpoche and Yongey Mingyur Rinpoche.

Dunne is the author of Foundations of Dharmakīrti's Philosophy, part of Wisdom Publications' "Studies in Indian and Tibetan Buddhism Series," a study of the thought of the important 7th century Buddhist philosopher Dharmakīrti.
