= Chokgyur Lingpa Foundation =

US-based non-profit organization

The Chokgyur Lingpa Foundation is a 501(c)(3) non-profit organization associated with a Tibetan Buddhist monastery, Ka-Nying Shedrub Ling, near Boudhanath, on the outskirts of Kathmandu, Nepal. Tsikey Chokling Rinpoche, along his son, Kyabgön Phakchok Rinpoche, serve as Spiritual Heads and Directors of the Chokgyur Lingpa Foundation. Their family contains many of the most popular modern Tibetan lamas, including Chokyi Nyima Rinpoche, Tsoknyi Rinpoche, and Mingyur Rinpoche.

The Chokgyur Lingpa Foundation was first founded in the US in 2006 by Tsikey Chokling Rinpoche together with Kyabgön Phakchok Rinpoche. Since then they have expanded their presence, and are now officially organized as a nonprofit organization in Nepal, the US and Hong Kong.

== Activities ==
The Chokgyur Lingpa Foundation supports both religious and secular education through the Monastic Education Fund and alliances with overseas universities to provide for scholarships to deserving young people from low-income backgrounds.

The Foundation also supports a variety of healthcare projects aimed at providing immediate delivery of treatments where needed, as well as sustaining a longer-term healthcare improvement within Nepal, through our Vajra Varahi Healthcare Clinic, annual Dental and Medical Camps, as well as an ongoing Tibetan Medicine Training Program.

The Foundation also hosts Lhasey Lotsawa Translations & Publications, a growing team of translators working under the guidance of Kyabjé Tsikey Chokling Rinpoche and Kyabgön Phakchok Rinpoche. Committed to making more of the Buddha’s and other great masters’ teachings accessible to fellow students worldwide, their mission is to produce authentic and accessible translations in English, Spanish, Chinese, Nepalese, Polish and other languages.

The Chokgyur Lingpa Foundation has been engaged in building an outer representation of Zangdok Palri in Vajravarahi, outside Kathmandu, Nepal.

== Earthquake relief and rebuilding effort ==
Nepal suffered a devastating earthquake and numerous aftershocks. Thousands of people died and many tens of thousands of others were left without housing, food or water, livelihood, and at serious health risk.

Under the direction of Phakchok Rinpoche and senior monks, the community in Nepal organized to aid many areas of Nepal and was very involved in rebuilding efforts throughout Nepal.
