= Tergar Meditation Community =

Buddhist meditation community

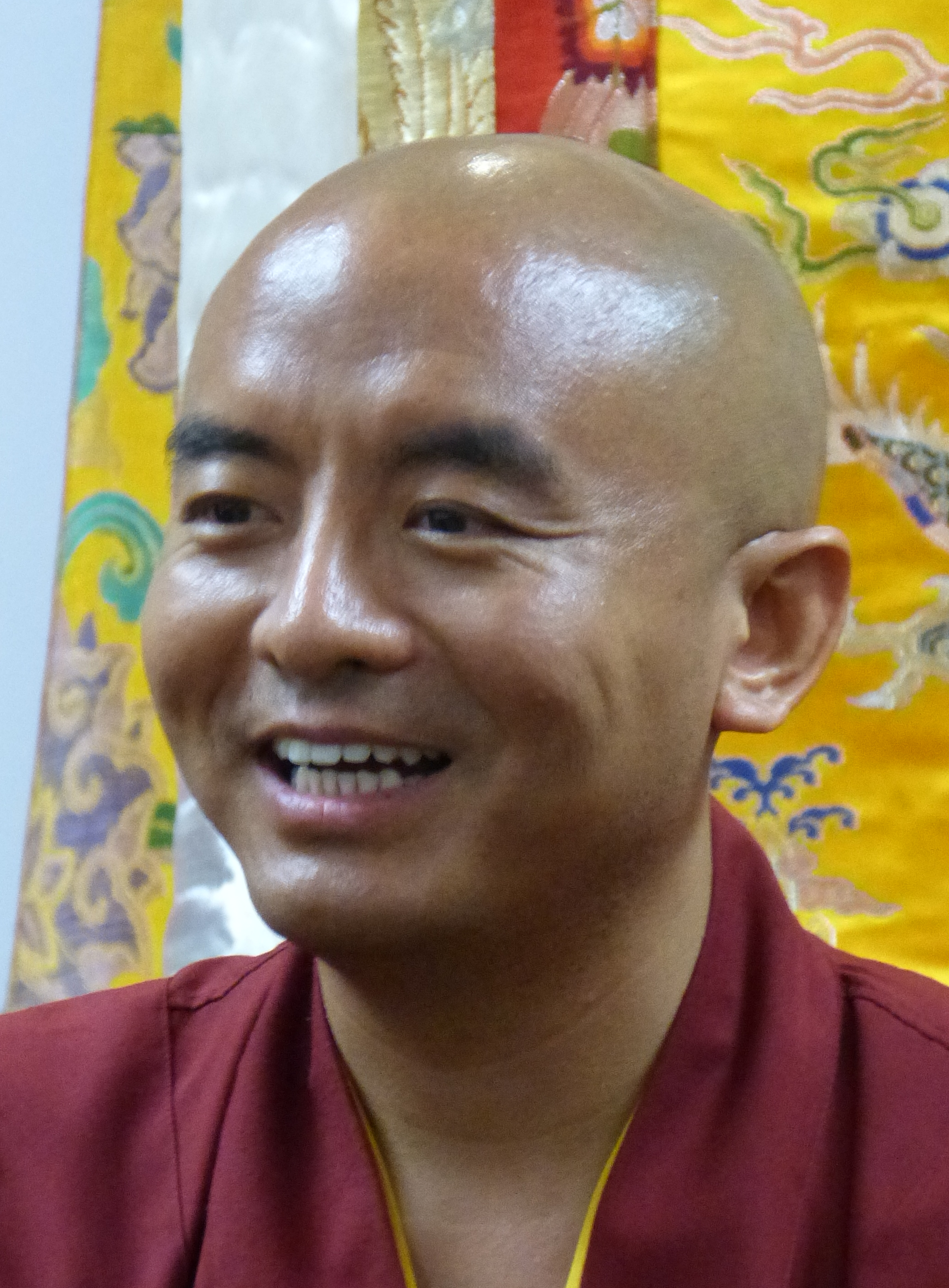
Yongey Mingyur Rinpoche in 2016.

Tergar Meditation Community is a Buddhist meditation community led by Tibetan meditation master and writer Yongey Mingyur Rinpoche.

Tergar (tib. གཏེར་སྒར་ gter sgar) means "encampment of the treasure revealer".

== Lineage ==
The Tergar largely descends from the Tibetan Buddhist Karma Kagyu lineage, and to a lesser extent the Nyingma lineage. "Ter" means treasure in the Tibetan language - meaning the practices and wisdom to obtain our greatest potential, alleviate suffering and attain enlightenment. "Gar" means gathering. "Tergar" then is the place where people assemble to enable transformation.

The Karma Kagyu lineage was passed down through Karmapas, Tai Situ Rinpoches and incarnations of Mingyur Rinpoche. The Nyingma lineage was transmitted through the treasure teachings (terma) of Kagyu and Nyingma masters.

The first school of the Tergar lineage began in the late 1600s by the 1st Mingyur Rinpoche, a wandering yogi, and his two sons who were tulkus. They first gathered in a tent in a camp (gar) and then in a monastery they built, Tergar Rigdzin Kacholing in eastern Tibet near Derge. His sons ran the monastery and the 1st Mingyur Rinpoche traveled and taught the Kagyu termas Pema Benza, Dorje Drolo, and the Union of Wisdom and Method Longevity Practice. These termas have been held and passed down by incarnations of Tai Situ Rinpoche and Karmapa. Tibetan texts have been destroyed by the Chinese government, so that the early Tergar lineage and history has been lost in the process.

The Tergar Rigdzin Kacholing monastery grew in the 18th and 19th centuries to include a nunnery, a small shedra, and 2 retreat centers. Another monastery, Namlong Gompa was established. The 6th Mingyur Rinpoche oversaw the studies of more than 100 monks and 60 nuns at the Tergar monasteries before he left Tibet and went into exile with the 16th Karmapa. The Chinese government looted the monastery buildings and jailed Gase Rinpoche, the reincarnation of the eldest son of the 1st Mingyur Rinpoche, who had remained at Tergar. He was released from jail in 1982 and with Pema Karpo Rinpoche, began rebuilding the monastery, with a retreat center and shrine room.

Tulku Urgyen Rinpoche continued the teachings of the Tergar tradition, including Dzogchen Desum and Chokgyur Lingpa's termas, with masters, lamas and major regents of the Kagyu and Nyingma traditions. His family line was the main holder of the Barom Kagyu lineage and was also linked to the Karma Kagyu lineage. He held the teachings of three great Nyingma masters Jamgön Kongtrul Lodrö Taye, Jamyang Khyentse Wangpo and Terchen Chokgyur Lingpa.

The 7th Mingyur Rinpoche (b. 1975) received Nyingma transmissions through his father Tulku Urgyen Rinpoche and Nyoshul Khen Rinpoche and Kagyu teachings from Tai Situ Rinpoche and Saljey Rinpoche. He also integrated modern ways of presenting Buddhist philosophy and practices of mindfulness, compassion and loving-kindness to people from a wide range of beliefs and backgrounds.

== Mission ==
The Tibetan Buddhist community's mission is "to make the ancient practice of meditation accessible to the modern world", leveraging meditation practices that have been used for centuries to "transform suffering into joy and confusion into wisdom."

== Meditation and study programs ==
Programs are offered to Buddhists and non-Buddhists in Tergar practice groups and meditation centers. The foundational study begins with three seminars on the "Joy of Living", which teaches how meditation "can be used to calm the mind, open the heart, and develop insight." Next is the "Path of Liberation" which is "designed to strip away the causes of suffering and uncover the radiant awareness that underlies all experience."

== Organizations ==
=== Programs, seminars and practice groups ===
Tergar Meditation Communities and Practice Groups provide seminars, study and meditation sessions. Tergar International manages training programs and development of study and practice materials outside of Asia. The Yongey Foundation was established by Rinpoche in 2003 to international activities, programs and publication of materials.

It has groups in the United States, Canada and Mexico in North America; Brazil in South America; Denmark, France, Germany, Spain, the United Kingdom, Russia, Ukraine in Europe; India, Nepal, Malaysia, Hong Kong, Indonesia, Taiwan, Singapore, and Australia.

=== Monasteries ===
Since Tergar International was founded in 2009, the Yongey Foundation focuses on the development and maintenance of the Kathmandu Tergar Ösel Ling Monastery in Nepal, Tergar Monastery in Eastern Tibet, and Tergar Monastery in Bodh Gaya in India, where Buddha achieved awakening. It also supports the development of a monastery for Tergar nuns.

=== Publications ===
==== Joy of Living ====
- Yongey Mingyur Rinpoche; Eric Swanson (2007). The Joy of Living: Unlocking the Secret and Science of Happiness. Crown Publishing Group. ISBN 978-0-307-38151-4.
- Joy of Living I Student Handbook: Calming the Mind. Tergar International. 2012. ISBN 978-1-937991-16-6.
- Joy of Living II Student Handbook: Opening the Heart. Tergar International. 2012. ISBN 978-1-937991-17-3.
- Joy of Living III Student Handbook: Awakening Wisdom. Tergar International. 2012. ISBN 978-1-937991-18-0.

==== Other publications ====
- Chariot for Traveling the Noble Path Insert. Tergar International. 2010. ISBN 978-1-937991-21-0.
- Daily White Tara Practice. Tergar International. 2010. ISBN 978-1-937991-27-2.
- Nectar of the Simple Yogi Insert. Tergar International. 2010. ISBN 978-1-937991-25-8.
- Pointing Out the Dharmakaya. Tergar International. 2011. ISBN 978-1-937991-20-3.
- Sublime Path to Enlightenment. Tergar International. 2010. ISBN 978-1-937991-28-9.
- Tergar Daily Chants. Tergar International. 2010. ISBN 978-1-937991-23-4.
- Yongey Mingyur Rinpoche; Torey L. Hayden (2009). Ziji, the Puppy who Learned to Meditate. Tergar International. ISBN 978-0-9563858-0-2.
