= Tsikey Chokling Rinpoche =

Tibetan teacher and religious ritual master

- Title: Tulku; Rinpoche

Personal life
- Born: Lungtok Gyatso; 1953 Tibet
- Died: 18 December 2020 (aged 66–67) Singapore
- Spouse: Sangyum Dechen Paldon
- Children: Phakchok Rinpoche, Mingyur Paldron, Kelsang Bhuti and Dilgo Khyentse Rinpoche
- Other name: Gyurmey Dewey Dorje

Religious life
- Religion: Buddhism
- School: Vajrayana
- Lineage: Kagyu and Nyingma

Senior posting
- Predecessor: Chokgyur Lingpa

Tsikey Chokling Rinpoche was a Tibetan teacher, writer, religious ritual master, and meditation master of the Nyingma school of Tibetan Buddhism.

Tsikey Chokling Rinpoche has been recognized by the 16th Karmapa as the fourth reincarnation of the 19th-century "treasure-discoverer" (tertön) Chokgyur Lingpa and is a holder of his Chokling Tersar lineage of teachings. He was the master of Vajrayana ceremonies at Ka-Nying Shedrup Ling monastery and of several other monasteries in Nepal. He also oversaw monasteries, nunneries, and practice centers in Tibet, India, Bhutan, and Sikkim. He published two books.

Chokling Rinpoche was the second son of Tulku Urgyen Rinpoche, a Tibetan Dzogchen meditation teacher who counted the 16th Karmapa among his students. His brothers are Chokyi Nyima Rinpoche, Tsoknyi Rinpoche, and Mingyur Rinpoche. Like his father, his grandfather and himself, Chokling Rinpoche's two sons have been recognized with the title "Rinpoche" based on their reincarnation lineage: Phakchok Rinpoche, the reincarnation and the lineage holder of the Taklung Kagyu lineage and the reincarnation of Dilgo Khyentse Rinpoche, Khyentse Yangsi Rinpoche.

His brother Chokyi Nyima Rinpoche, the abbot of Ka-Nying Shedrub Ling, made the announcement that, at 10:12 AM local time on 18 December 2020 in Singapore, Tsikey Chokling Rinpoche "had entered a state of tukdam (Tib: ཐུགས་དམ་)—an advanced meditative state practiced by Buddhist masters during the intermediate post-death period." He was additionally survived by his wife and four children.

== Activities ==
Tsikey Chokling Rinpoche, through his foundation, The Chokgyur Lingpa Foundation, supports both many different projects including religious, humanitarian, and educational projects through the Monastic Education Fund. The healthcare projects are aimed at providing treatments throughout Nepal where needed, as well as longer-term healthcare improvement, through the Vajra Varahi Healthcare Clinic, the annual Dental and Medical Camps. The Foundation hosts publication teams through Lhasey Lotsawa Translations & Publications, a growing team of translators. Committed to making more of the Dharma accessible to fellow students worldwide, the mission is to produce authentic and accessible translations in many languages.

The Chokgyur Lingpa Foundation is also building Zangdok Palri (a model of Padmasambhava's pure land, Copper-Colored Mountain) in Vajravarahi, outside Kathmandu, Nepal. The Chokgyur Lingpa Foundation has a growing number of organizations around the world as well as students in many countries, more than fifty, including Malaysia, United States, Poland, Singapore, Hong Kong, Indonesia, Taiwan, Thailand, Germany, Canada, Mexico, Brazil, Austria, Scotland, Great Britain and Israel. Chokling Rinpoche was on the board of the non-profit organization Rangjung Yeshe Shenpen, also based in Nepal.

== Earthquake and rebuilding ==
On Saturday, 25 April 2015, Nepal suffered a major earthquake that registered 7.8 on the Richter scale. This was the largest earthquake for at least 80 years. Large and numerous aftershocks by the hundreds followed in the weeks following that earthquake. Many thousands of people died and hundreds of thousands were left homeless and in need of medical care. Under the direction of Tsikey Chokling Rinpoche and Phakchok Rinpoche and senior monks, everyone associated with Tsikey Chokling Rinpoche, his monastery, and his foundation in Nepal have organized to help rebuild Nepal.

== Publications ==
- Chokling Rinpoche (2001). Lotus Ocean: Seeds of the Sublime Dharma. Rangjung Yeshe Publications.
- Chokling Rinpoche (2008). The Great Gate: A Guidebook to the Guru's Heart Practice, Dispeller of All Obstacles. Rangjung Yeshe Publications. ISBN 978-962-7341-04-8.
