= Longde =

Longde may refer to:

- Longdé, one of three scriptural divisions within Dzogchen
- Longde County, county in Ningxia, China
