= Tsoknyi Rinpoche =

Tibetan Buddhist teacher and author

- Title: Rinpoche

Personal life
- Born: 1966 (age 59–60) Nubri, Nepal
- Website: tsoknyirinpoche.org

Religious life
- Religion: Tibetan Buddhism
- School: Kagyu
- Lineage: Drukpa Lineage

Senior posting
- Teacher: Tulku Urgyen Rinpoche, Adeu Rinpoche, Dilgo Khyentse Rinpoche, Nyoshul Khen Rinpoche, Eighth Khamtrul Rinpoche Dongyud Nyima
- Reincarnation: Drubwang Tsoknyi II
- Students: Richard Gere, Daniel Goleman

Tsoknyi Rinpoche (Wylie tshogs gnyis rin po che) or Ngawang Tsoknyi Gyatso (born 13 March 1966) is a Tibetan Buddhist teacher and author, and the founder of the Pundarika Foundation. He is the third Tsoknyi Rinpoche, having been recognized by the 16th Karmapa as the reincarnation of Drubwang Tsoknyi Rinpoche. He is a tulku of the Drukpa Kagyü and Nyingma traditions and the holder of the Ratna Lingpa and Tsoknyi lineages., and a son of great master Tulku Urgyen Rinpoche.

At the age of thirteen, he began his education at Khampagar Monastery at Tashi Jong in Himachal Pradesh, India. His main teachers are Khamtrul Rinpoche Dongyu Nyima, his father Tulku Urgyen Rinpoche, Dilgo Khyentse Rinpoche, Nyoshul Khen Rinpoche and Adeu Rinpoche.

Rinpoche has overseen the Tergar Osel Ling Monastery, founded in Kathmandu, Nepal by his father, Tulku Urgyen Rinpoche. His brothers are Chokyi Nyima Rinpoche, Tsikey Chokling Rinpoche, and Mingyur Rinpoche and his nephews are Phakchok Rinpoche and the reincarnation of Dilgo Khyentse Rinpoche, known popularly as Khyentse Yangsi Rinpoche. He has overseen the monastery's operations and introduced studies for non-Tibetans. Under his leadership it has "thrived and grown into a mature sangha of dedicated practitioners."

In 2005, he led a group of students to Nangchen in Eastern Tibet to meet the Tsoknyi Nangchen nuns, who live and practice meditation in remote nunneries and hermitages. This trip became the subject of a documentary called "Blessings: The Tsoknyi Nangchen Nuns of Tibet" narrated by Richard Gere.

== Publications ==
- Tsoknyi Rinpoche, Open Heart, Open Mind—Awakening the Power of Essence Love, New York: Harmony, 2012 ISBN 978-0-307-88820-4
- Tsoknyi Rinpoche, Carefree Dignity: Discourses on Training in the Nature of Mind (Boudhanath, Hong Kong & Esby: Rangjung Yeshe Publications, 1998)
- Tsoknyi Rinpoche, Fearless Simplicity: The Dzogchen Way of Living Freely in a Complex World, (Boudhanath, Hong Kong & Esby: Rangjung Yeshe Publications, 2003) ISBN 962-7341-48-7
- Tsokyni, Rinpoche, Sylvia Boorstein, Norman Fischer, "Solid Ground: Buddhist Wisdom for Difficult Times," (Berkeley: Parallax Press, 2011)
- Goleman, Daniel and Tsoknyi Rinpoche, Why We Meditate: The Science and Practice of Clarity and Compassion, New York: Atria Books, 2022 ISBN 978-1-9821-7845-1
