= Padma Gargyi Wangchug =

Padma Gargyi Wangchug or Padma Gargyi Wangchuk is a Tibetan name which may refer to one of the following people:

- Jamgön Kongtrül Lodrö Thayé (1813–1899), a Tibetan Buddhist scholar, poet, artist, physician, tertön and polymath.
- Chagdud Tulku Rinpoche (1930–2002), a Tibetan teacher of the Nyingma school of Tibetan Vajrayana Buddhism.
