= Neten Chokling =

Bhutanese actor and director (born 1973)

Neten Chokling Rinpoche (Tibetan: གནས་བརྟན་མཆོག་གླིང་རིན་པོ་ཆེ, Wylie: gnas brtan mchog gling rin po che, THL: né-ten chok-ling rin-po-ché), is also referred to as the 4th Neten Chokling Rinpoche. He is also known for acting and directing films, including a 2006 feature film about Milarepa.

== Life ==
Neten Chokling was born on August 10, 1973, into a farming family in Wangdue Phodrang in Bhutan. He was recognized by the 16th Karmapa and Dilgo Khyentse Rinpoche as being the reincarnation of Neten Chokling Pema Gyurme. At the age of four, he was taken to his monastery — the Pema Ewam Chögar Gyurme Ling Monastery — in Bir, India, and enthroned by Dilgo Khyentse Rinpoche in Clement Town at the Ngedön Gatsal Ling monastery. Before arriving in his home monastery, Rinpoche was also enthroned in Rumtek by H.H. 16th Karmapa, who gave him the name Rigdzin Gyurme Dorje. He has received the transmissions of the Kangyur, Nyingma Gyübum, Nyingma Kama, Rinchen Terdzö and Chokling Tersar, as well as many other teachings from Dilgo Khyentse Rinpoche. Orgyen Tobgyal Rinpoche, one of the sons of the previous Neten Chokling Rinpoche, participated in the education of his father's reincarnation before transferring to him the full responsibility of his monastery in 2004.

Neten Chokling, along with Tsikey Chokling Rinpoche, is one of the four reincarnations of Chokgyur Lingpa. This lineage traces back to Trisong Detsen, a Tibetan king who invited Padmasambhava to Tibet.

Neten Chokling Rinpoche is married to Tenzing Choyang Gyari, the second eldest daughter of Gyari Rinpoche. Their son is Tulku Urgyen Yangsi Rinpoche.

Rinpoche acted in Dzongsar Khyentse Rinpoche's films The Cup (1999) and Travellers and Magicians (2003). In 2006, he directed his own film, The Life of Milarepa - Part I, about the adventurous years of the legendary Buddhist mystic, Milarepa (1052–1135). Milarepa, who initially set out for vengeance and retribution, is one of the best known Tibetan saints .
