= Yongey Mingyur Rinpoche =

Tibetan teacher

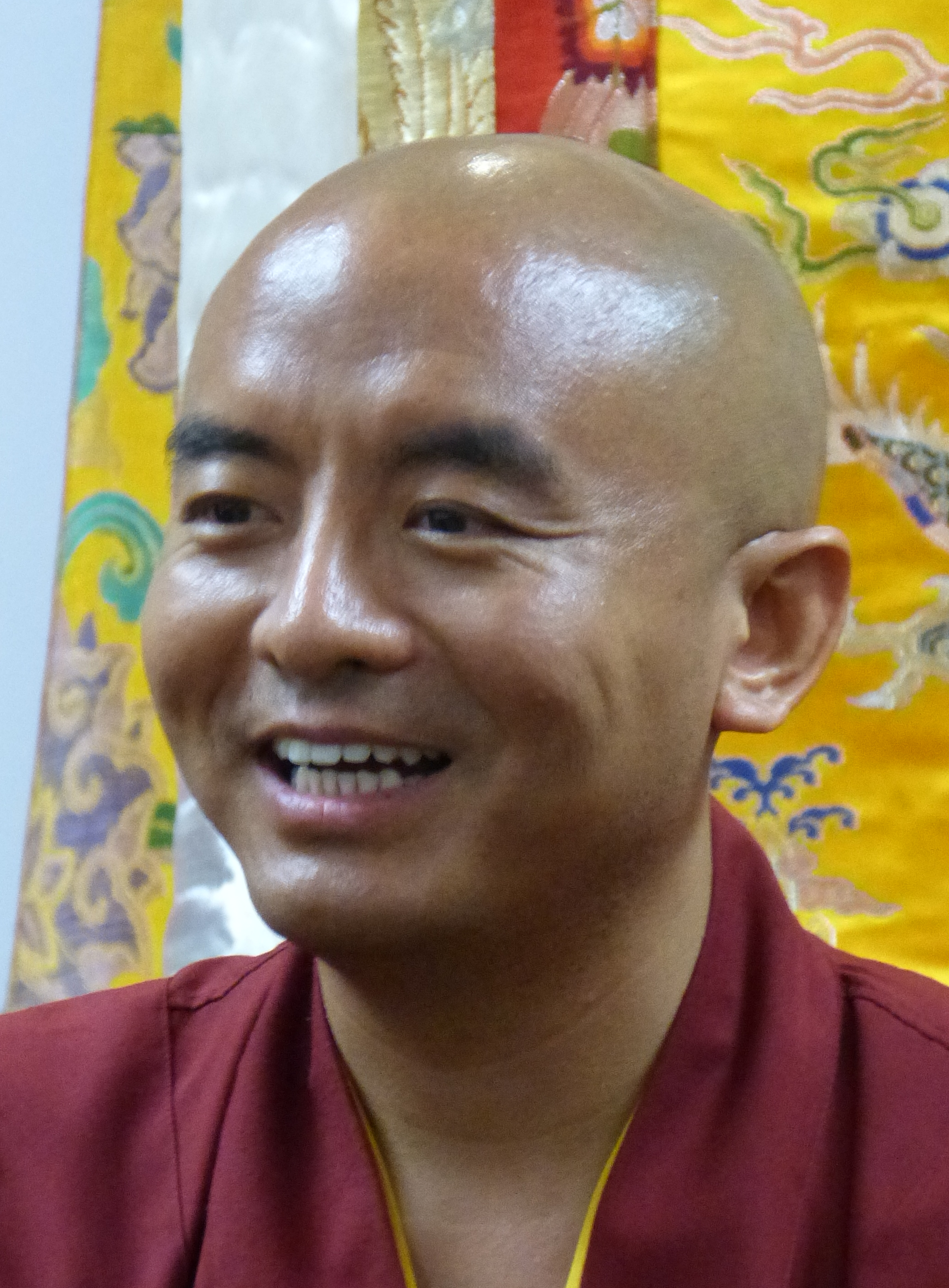
- Mingyur Rinpoche in 2016
- Title: Rinpoche

Personal life
- Born: 1975 (age 50–51) Nepal

Religious life
- Religion: Kagyu Nyingma

Yongey Mingyur Rinpoche (Tibet: ཡོངས་དགེ་མི་འགྱུར་རིན་པོ་ཆེ། Wylie: yongs dge mi 'gyur rin po che) is a Tibetan Nepali teacher and master of the Karma Kagyu and Nyingma lineages of Tibetan Buddhism. He has written five books, including the 2007 bestseller The Joy of Living, and oversees the Tergar Meditation Community, an international network of Buddhist meditation centers and programs.

== Life ==
Mingyur Rinpoche was born in Nepal in 1975 the youngest of four brothers. His mother is Sönam Chödrön, a descendant of the two Tibetan kings Songtsen Gampo and Trisong Deutsen. His brothers are Chokyi Nyima Rinpoche, Tsikey Chokling Rinpoche, and Tsoknyi Rinpoche and his nephews are Phakchok Rinpoche and the reincarnation of Dilgo Khyentse Rinpoche, known popularly as Khyentse Yangsi Rinpoche. From the age of nine, his father, Tulku Urgyen Rinpoche, taught him meditation, passing on to him the most essential instructions of the Dzogchen and Mahamudra traditions.

At the age of eleven, Mingyur Rinpoche began studies at Sherab Ling Monastery in northern India, the seat of Tai Situ Rinpoche. Two years later, Mingyur Rinpoche began a traditional three-year retreat at Sherab Ling. At the age of nineteen, he enrolled at Dzongsar Institute, where, under the tutelage of the renowned Khenpo Kunga Wangchuk, he studied the primary topics of the Buddhist academic tradition, including Middle Way philosophy and Buddhist logic. At age twenty, Mingyur Rinpoche became the functioning abbot of Sherab Ling. At twenty-three, he received full monastic ordination. During this time, Mingyur Rinpoche received important Dzogchen transmissions from Nyoshul Khen Rinpoche.

In 2007, Mingyur Rinpoche completed the construction of Tergar Monastery in Bodhgaya, India, which will serve large numbers of people attending Buddhist events at this sacred pilgrimage site, serve as an annual site for month-long Karma Kagyu scholastic debates, and serve as an international study institute for the Sangha and laity. The institute will also have a medical clinic for local people.

Mingyur Rinpoche has overseen the Kathmandu Tergar Osel Ling Monastery, founded by his father, since 2010. He also opened a shedra (monastic college) at the monastery.

In June 2011, Mingyur Rinpoche left his monastery in Bodhgaya to begin a period of extended retreat. Rinpoche left in the middle of the night, taking nothing with him, but leaving a farewell letter. He spent four years as a wandering yogi.

During the first few weeks of this retreat, Rinpoche had a near-death experience, likely due to a severe form of botulism. This may have been the result of choosing to eat only the meals that were free and available to him after allowing himself to run out of money. The near-death experience, according to Rinpoche, was one of the most pivotal and transformative experiences of his life. After continuing with his retreat for four years, he later returned to his position as abbot.

== Books ==
- The Joy of Living: Unlocking the Secret and Science of Happiness. Harmony Books. 2007. ISBN 978-0-307-34625-4. (with Eric Swanson)
- Joyful Wisdom: Embracing Change and Finding Freedom. Harmony Books. 2009. ISBN 978-0-307-40779-5. (with Eric Swanson)
- Ziji: The Puppy Who Learned to Meditate. Tergar International. 2009. ISBN 978-0-95638580-2. (with Torey Hayden and Charity Larrison)
- Turning Confusion into Clarity: A Guide to the Foundation Practices of Tibetan Buddhism. Snow Lion. 2014. ISBN 978-1-61180-121-7. (with Helen Tworkov)
- Ziji and the Very Scary Man. Wisdom Publications. 2018. ISBN 978-1614294733. (with Torey Hayden and Charity Larrison)
- In Love with the World: A Monk's Journey Through the Bardos of Living and Dying. Random House. 2019. ISBN 978-0-525-51253-0. (with Helen Tworkov)

== See also ==
- Namchö Mingyur Dorje
