= Tergar Osel Ling Monastery =

Tibetan Buddhist monastery in Kathmandu, Nepal

- Location within Nepal

Religion
- Affiliation: Tibetan Buddhism

Location
- Location: Kathmandu
- Country: Nepal
- Interactive map of Tergar Osel Ling Monastery
- Coordinates: 27°43′4.67″N 85°16′36.02″E

Architecture
- Founder: Tulku Urgyen Rinpoche

Tergar Osel Ling Monastery or Tergar Lungrik Osel Targyé Ling Monastery is a Tibetan Buddhist monastery in Kathmandu, Nepal of the Tergar Meditation Community.

== History ==
The Tergar Osel Ling Monastery was founded in Kathmandu, Nepal by Tulku Urgyen Rinpoche. His son Tsoknyi Rinpoche has overseen the monastery's operations and introduced studies for non-Tibetans. Under his leadership it has "thrived and grown into a mature sangha of dedicated practitioners." Another son, Yongey Mingyur Rinpoche, a fully ordained monk, has formally overseen the monastery since 2010. He also opened a shedra, a monastic college in February 2010. His brother, Tsoknyi Rinpoche, has continued to be closely involved in the community. He has been quoted as saying: "Simply let experience take place very freely, so that your open heart is suffused with the tenderness of true compassion."

In 2011 Mingyur Rinpoche, a best selling author, left the monastery for a traveling retreat expected to last 3 years or more.

== Overview ==
The monastery is a Tibetan Buddhist monastery located on the outskirts of Kathmandu. More than 100 Himalayan monks study Buddhist meditative practices and philosophical inquiry at the monastery.

== See also ==
- Ka-Nying Shedrub Ling, also founded by Tulku Urgyen Rinpoche
