= Sherab Zangpo =

- Born: November 1963 (age 62); Derge, Garzê Tibetan Autonomous Prefecture, Sichuan, China

Khenpo Sherab Zangpo (Tibetan: ཤེས་རབ་བཟང་པོ།) is a venerable lineage master of the Great Perfection, whose root teacher is late Khenpo Jigme Phuntsok, the founder of the world's largest Buddhist institute Larung Gar Buddhist Institute of Five Sciences in China. His principal Dharma Center is located in Derge of Eastern Tibet (Kham).

== Biography ==
Born in 1963 to a nomadic family in Derge of Kham, Khenchen Sherab Zangpo received his Buddhist education at a very young age from several accomplished masters in the region. At age 13, he studied Buddhist chanting and rituals at Derge's Tashi Monastery under abbot Tulku Genning's tutelage. At 17 Khenchen received the instructions from Dzogchen master Khenpo Tsewang Jigme on the initial stage of and leading practices of Dzogchen.

In 1984, at 21, Khenchen Sherab Zangpo received the full as well as novice ordination. In the same year, he went to Larung Buddhist Institute of Five Sciences and became a close student of Jigme Phunstok Rinpoche. Having received his khenpo degree in 1987, he followed Rinpoche's advice to teach at Larung. Since 1990 he has also been presiding over Larung's administrative affairs.

During the Kalachakra ceremonial gathering held at Larung in 1986, Jigme Phuntsok Rinpoche prophesied that Khenchen Sherab Zangpo, together with his other three principal students, would become the lineage holders and spreaders of the Nyingma school. On a pilgrimage to Mount Wutai one year later, Khenchen Sherab Zangpo received the oral transmission of Dzogchen from Rinpoche. Khenchen had been with Rinpoche for 21 years until his death and has received his entire lineage.

In 1994, Khenchen Sherab Zangpo set up Tashi Triling and, subsequently, its affiliated old people's house and hospital near his birthplace to aid the locals and support monastic education.

from his Dharma activities in the Tibetan region, Khenchen Sherab Zangpo teaches Buddhist Dharma, guides group practices and promotes animal life-release practice in both China's Han region as well as overseas.

== Works ==
- The Path: A Guide to Happiness

Paperback: 224 pages; Publisher: Wisdom Publications
(December,2017); ISBN 9781614294153

- Seeing the World through Buddhism

Paperback: 321 pages; Publisher: CHINA CITIC PRESS
(August __, 2014); ISBN 9787508646978

- How to Play Your Life

Paperback: 255 pages; Publisher: SINO-CULTURE PRESS
(August __, 2013); ISBN 9787507540512

- The Way to Inner Tranquility

Paperback: 357 pages; Publisher: BEIJING WORLD PUBLISHING CORPORATION
(February __, 2012); ISBN 9787510044229

- The Path

Paperback: 280 pages; Publisher: China Hainan Press
(March __, 2011); ISBN 9787544334792

== Tashi Triling ==
Tashi Triling is a Buddhist Dharma center located in Derge of the Tibetan Kham region. The Tibetan words Tashi Triling literally mean “the land of an auspicious throne”, as the sacred mountain of Hayagriva where the center has the shape of a throne. The center is surrounded by stunning peaks, lush trees and clear rivers, which is ideal for Dharma study and spiritual practice.

The center houses the Guru Renpoche Hall, the Mandala Palace of Zangdoc Palri, the Manjushri Hall, the Memorial Hall of the late Khenpo Jigme Phuntsok, the Vajrasattva Palace, various prayer wheels and other sacred objects and representatives. It is one of the main dharma centers where Khenpo Sherab Zangpo teaches and has his own retreat.
