= Longdé =

One of three scriptural divisions within Dzogchen

Longdé (Tibetan: ཀློང་སྡེ།, Wylie: klong sde, Sanskrit: abhyantaravarga) is the name of one of three scriptural divisions within Dzogchen, which is itself the pinnacle of the ninefold division of practice according to the Nyingma school of Tibetan Buddhism.

The name "longdé" is translated as "Space Division" or "Space Series" of Dzogchen and emphasises the emptiness (Tibetan: སྟོང་པ།, Wylie: stong pa) or spaciousness (Tibetan: ཀློང།, Wylie: klong) aspect of the Natural State.

Due to the different approaches of various Dzogchen lineages, three series of teachings have developed, of which longdé is one. The other two divisions or series are semde and menngagde. Penor Rinpoche attributes longdé to Dorje Zampa, Sri Singha and Vairotsana's lineage.

== History ==
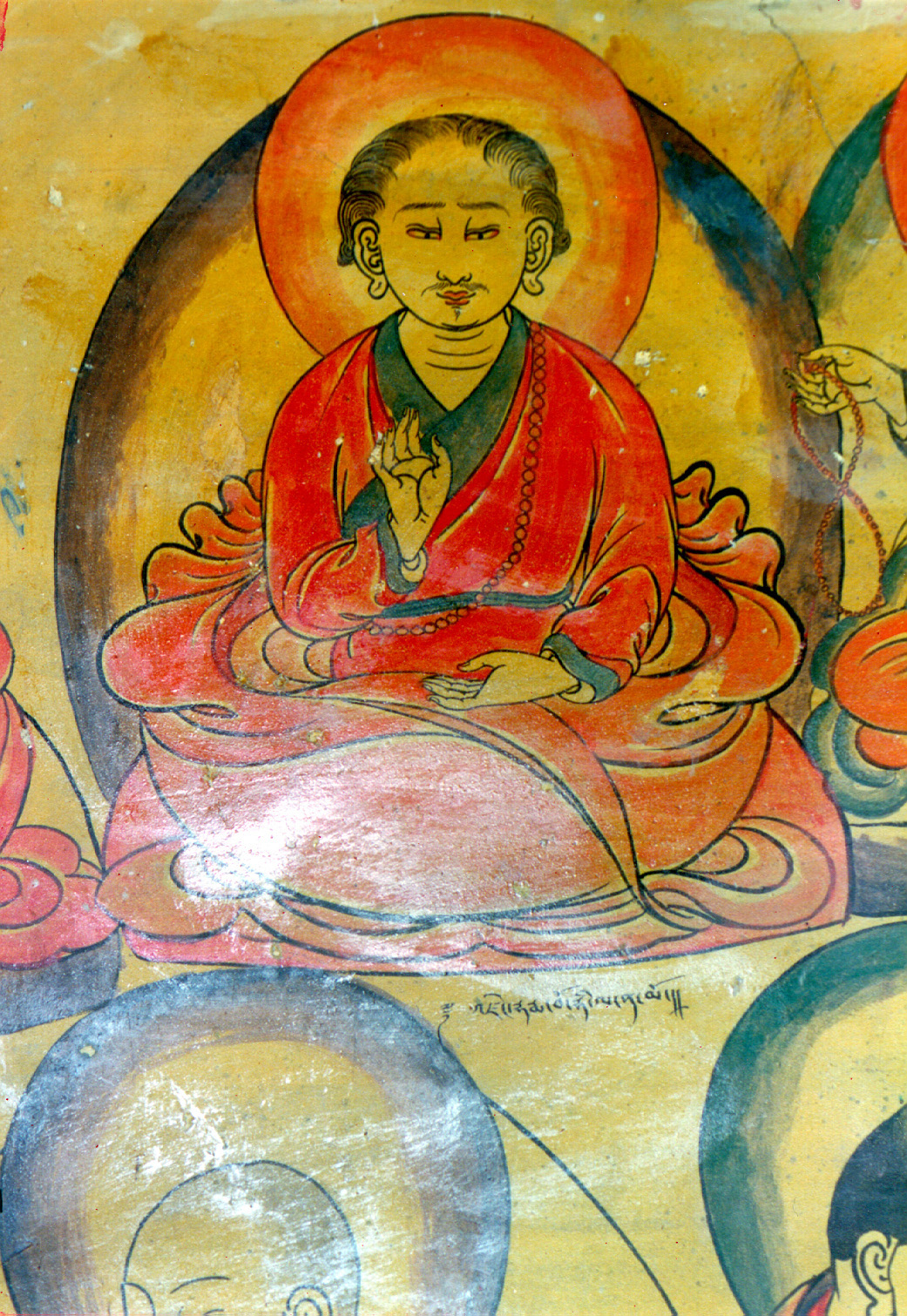
'Dzeng Dharmabodhi, (b.1052 - d.1168), a master of the Vajra Bridge

The series of Space reflects the developments of the 11th–14th centuries and emphasizes "space" or "expanse" (klong). According to Sten Anspal this class of texts "is difficult to define or characterize uniformly" and "were not unified into a single system". Because of this, it has been seen either as nearly identical with the earlier Semde (Mind) Series, or as "occupying doctrinally a position between Mind and lnstruction Section."

According to Anspal, "Space" in these texts "is used to describe aspects in which the individual's true nature of mind is analogous to space. For example, space is present everywhere and no effort is needed to reach it; it cannot be transcended: it is immense. encompassing everything: it is devoid of characteristics and cannot be apprehended; it is without center or periphery; it is eternal and uncaused; there is no support in space and nothing to focus on: and so forth." One of the central themes of these texts is the doctrine of "the Nine Spaces" (The Spaces of View, Behavior, Mandala, Initiation, Commitment, Activity, Accomplishment, Levels - Paths, and Fruition). Each of these practices which refer to features of Buddhist tantra, is said to be spacious and complete within one's true nature and thus gradualist and tantric practices are seen as unnecessary for those who understand their mind's true nature. So, for example, there is no need to create a mandala in one's mind to practice, since when one realizes the true nature of mind, all perceptions are the mandala. Likewise, there is no need to go through ritual initiation, since realizing one's nature is already an initiation. In this sense, Dzogchen is seen as transcending tantra.

As noted by Anspal, some Space Series tantras like Equal to the End of Sky (Nam-mkha'i mtha'-dang mnyam-pa) "do not prescribe any particular techniques for the practitioner, such as physical postures or movements, structured meditative exercises, etc." In this sense, they are similar to Mind Series Tantras.

Another tradition which is often grouped as part of the Space Series is the Vajra Bridge (rdo rje zam pa) tradition. These texts include numerous tantric rites connected with Heruka and three Dakinis. However, the commentaries on Vajra Bridge texts indicate that these tantric rituals are auxiliary practices that "are secondary to the main practice that is Great Perfection contemplation of the nature of mind, and which is not here practiced in the formalized context of Tantric sadhana." A key figure in this tradition is 'Dzeng Dharmabodhi (1052-1168). His student, Kun-bzang rdo-rje, wrote numerous commentaries on Vajra Bridge. The key Tantra of this tradition was entitled Secret Wisdom (Ye-shes gsang-ba). The following verse "was interpreted as the essential summary of the way of contemplation in the rDo-rje zam-pa":

With one's body in a secluded place, cut the attachment to external [sense data] and internal [conceptuality], [assume the posture endowed with] seven characteristics, (chos bdun), and balance the physical elements ('byung-ba) [of the body]. Without blocking the six sense aggregates, settle in mere ordinary awareness. Externally, the elements of the body are balanced; internally, inhalation and exhalation are absent. One arrives at the meaning of uncontrived naturalness. That which is called "human being" is Buddha. There is no Vajrasattva apart from oneself.

In the Vajra Bridge tradition, contemplation of the true nature of mind, which was also referred to as "non-meditation", was introduced through the use of "four signs", which "are the experiences of non-conceptuality (mi-rtog-pa), clarity (gsal-ba), bliss (bde-ba) and the inseparability (dbyer mi-phyed-pa) of the first three as the fourth." Some of the Vajra Bridge texts also make use of subtle body yogas of winds (vayus), though they are relatively simple and "effortless" (rtsol-bral) in comparison to the wind yogas of the completion stage found in the Sarma tantras, which are seen as inferior and coarse by the Vajra Bridge authors such as Kun-bzang rdo-rje.

== Texts ==
"Samantabhadra’s Royal Tantra of All-Inclusive Vastness" (Sanskrit: Mahāvartta prasāraṇi rāja tantra nāma; Wylie: klong chen rab byams rgyal po’i rgyud ces bya ba bzhugs so) is renowned as the “king” of tantras belonging to the Space Section. list the tantric texts belonging to the Space Division thus:

- 'King of Infinite Vast Space' or 'Longchen Rabjam Gyalpo' (Tibetan: ཀློང་ཆེན་རབ་འབྱམས་རྒྱལ་པོ, Wylie: klong chen rab 'byams rgyal po) Skt: mahāvartta prasāraṇi rāja tantra
- 'Total Space of Samantabhadra' or 'Kunto Zangpo Namkhache' (Tibetan: ཀུན་ཏུ་བཟང་པོ་ནམ་མཁའ་ཆེ, Wylie: kun tu bzang po nam mkha' che) Skt: samanta bhadra mahā gagana mūla saṃgraha tantra
- 'Manifestation of the Creative Energy of Spiritual Awareness' or 'Rigpa Rangtsal Sharwa' (Tibetan: རིག་པ་རང་རྩལ་ཤར་བ, Wylie: rig pa rang rtsal shar ba) Skt: bodhicitta samantabhadra vidyā parākramodaya tantra
- 'Wheel of Key Instructions' or 'Dam-ngag Natshog Khorlo' (Tibetan: གདམས་ངག་སྣ་ཚོགས་འཁོར་ལོ, Wylie: gdams ngag sna tshogs 'khor lo) Skt:
- 'Array of the Exalted Path' or 'Phaglam Kodpa' (Tibetan: འཕགས་ལམ་བཀོད་པ, Wylie: 'phags lam bkod pa) Skt: ratnārya patha vyūha tantra
- 'Vajrasattva Equal to the Limits of Space' or 'Dorje Sempa Namkha'i Thatang Nyampa' (Tibetan: རྡོ་རྗེ་སེམས་དཔའ་ནམ་མཁའི་མཐའ་དང་མཉམ་པ, Wylie: rdo rje sems dpa' nam mkha'i mtha' dang mnyam pa) Skt: vajra satvākāśānta sama mahā tantra
- 'Secret Pristine Awareness' or 'Lamp of Secret Pristine Awareness' or 'Yeshe Sangwa Dronma' (Tibetan: ཡེ་ཤེས་གསང་བ་སྒྲོན་མ, Wylie: ye shes gsang ba sgron ma) Skt: jñāna guhya dīpa ratnopadeśa tantra
- 'Wheel of Precious Gems' or 'Rinpoche Khorlo' (Tibetan: རིན་པོ་ཆེ་འཁོར་ལོ, Wylie: rin po che 'khor lo) Skt: ratna cakra nāma tantra
- 'Secret Pristine Awareness' or 'Yeshe Sangwa' (Tibetan: ཡེ་ཤེས་གསང་བ, Wylie: ye shes gsang ba) Skt: jñāna guhya nāma tantra
- 'Perfect Pristine Awareness' or 'Yeshe Dzogpa' (Tibetan: ཡེ་ཤེས་རྫོགས་པ, Wylie: ye shes rdzogs pa) bodhicittāti jñāna sandhi tantra
- 'Total Revelation of the All-Pervasive Mind of Enlightenment' or 'Changchub Kyi Sems Kunla Jugpa Namtag Tonpa' (Tibetan: བྱང་ཆུབ་ཀྱི་སེམས་ཀུན་ལ་འཇུག་པ་རྣམ་དག་སྟོན་པ, Wylie: byang chub kyi sems kun la 'jug pa rnam dag ston pa)
- 'Radiant Vajra of the Mind of Enlightenment' or 'Changchug Kyi Sem Dorje Odthro' (Tibetan: བྱང་ཆུབ་ཀྱི་སེམས་རྡོ་རྗེ་འོད་འཕྲོ, Wylie: byang chub kyi sems rdo rje 'od 'phro) Skt: bodhicitta vajra prabhā spharaṇa tantra paṭala

According to Thondup & Talbott (1997: p. 48) there are only seven extant texts of the Space Class and they are collected in the Nyingma Gyubum.

Additionally, there is one terma text in the Space Class, which is contained in the Chokling Tersar cycle of Orgyen Chokgyur Lingpa. Tulku Urgyen writes,

no other terton has revealed a teaching that includes the Space Section (Longde) of Dzogchen. There are several Mind Section (Semde) revelations and all major tertons have revealed the Instruction Section (Mengagde), but only Chokgyur Lingpa transmitted the Space Section. This is why the Dzogchen Desum is considered the most extraordinary terma that he ever revealed.

== See also ==
- Menngagde (Secret instructions series)
- Semde (Mind series)
