= Tulku Urgyen Rinpoche =

Buddhist master of the Kagyü and Nyingma lineages

- Title: Tulku; Rinpoche

Personal life
- Born: 1920 Nangchen, Kham, Tibet
- Died: February 13, 1996 (aged 75–76)

Religious life
- Religion: Tibetan Buddhism
- School: Kagyu; Nyingma

Senior posting
- Successor: His four sons
- Reincarnation: Chowang Tulku

Tulku Urgyen Rinpoche (1920 – February 13, 1996) (Tibetan: སྤྲུལ་སྐུ་ཨོ་རྒྱན་རིན་པོ་ཆེ་, Wylie: sprul-sku o-rgyan rin-po-che) (Nepali: टुल्कु उर्ग्येन् रिन्पोचे) was a Buddhist master of the Kagyü and Nyingma lineages who lived at Nagi Gompa hermitage in Nepal. Urgyen Rinpoche was considered one of the greatest Dzogchen masters of his time.

== Life ==
Born in Nangchen, Kham in Eastern Tibet in 1920, he was recognized by Khakyab Dorje, 15th Karmapa Lama as the reincarnation of both the Chowang Tulku and Nubchen Sangye Yeshe, one of the 25 principal students of Padmasambhava.

Urgyen's father was Tsangsar Chimey Dorje, a vajrayana instructor who began giving Urgyen transmission for the Kangyur, the Buddha, and "The New Treasures of Chokgyur Lingpa." As he grew older, he studied Dzogchen with Samten Gyatso.

He had four sons, each of whom is now an important Buddhist teacher in his own right (Chökyi Nyima Rinpoche, Tsikey Chokling Rinpoche, Tsoknyi Rinpoche and Mingyur Rinpoche); among his grandchildren are Kyabgön Phakchok Rinpoche and Dilgo Khyentse Yangsi Rinpoche.

Urgyen spent 33 years at Nagi Gompa Hermitage, where he spent two decades in retreat, and eventually established six monasteries and retreat centers in Nepal. This included a monastery close to the Great Jarung Khashor Stupa in Boudhanath (Ka-Nying Shedrub Ling monastery). Another is the Tergar Osel Ling Monastery in Kathmandu, Nepal.

Urgyen Rinpoche died on the morning of February 13, 1996.

== Teaching ==
Tulku Urgyen was the author of the two-volume As It Is, which deals with the subject of emptiness. His main transmissions were the Chokling Tersar and the pointing-out instruction.

Buddhist teacher and writer Marcia Binder Schmidt wrote of him:

Tulku Urgyen Rinpoche's special quality was to begin with the view rather than end with it; to train in devotion, compassion, and renunciation, perfecting the accumulations, and removing obscurations, all within the framework of the view. The practitioner was encouraged to see all these aspects of practice as the very expressions of the view itself. That was Tulku Urgyen's unique style.

Author and neuroscientist Sam Harris was a student of Tulku Urgyen Rinpoche. Describing the Dzogchen instruction he received, Harris wrote:

"The genius of Tulku Urgyen was that he could point out the nature of mind with precision and matter-of-factness of teaching a person how to thread a needle and could get an ordinary meditator like me to recognize that consciousness is intrinsically free of self... I came to Tulku Urgyen yearning for the experience of self-transcendence, and in a few minutes he showed me I had no self to transcend... After a few minutes, Tulku Urgyen simply handed me the ability to cut through the illusion of the self directly, even in ordinary states of consciousness. This instruction was, without question, the most important thing I have ever been explicitly taught by another human being. It has given me a way to escape the usual tides of psychological suffering - fear, anger, shame - in an instant."

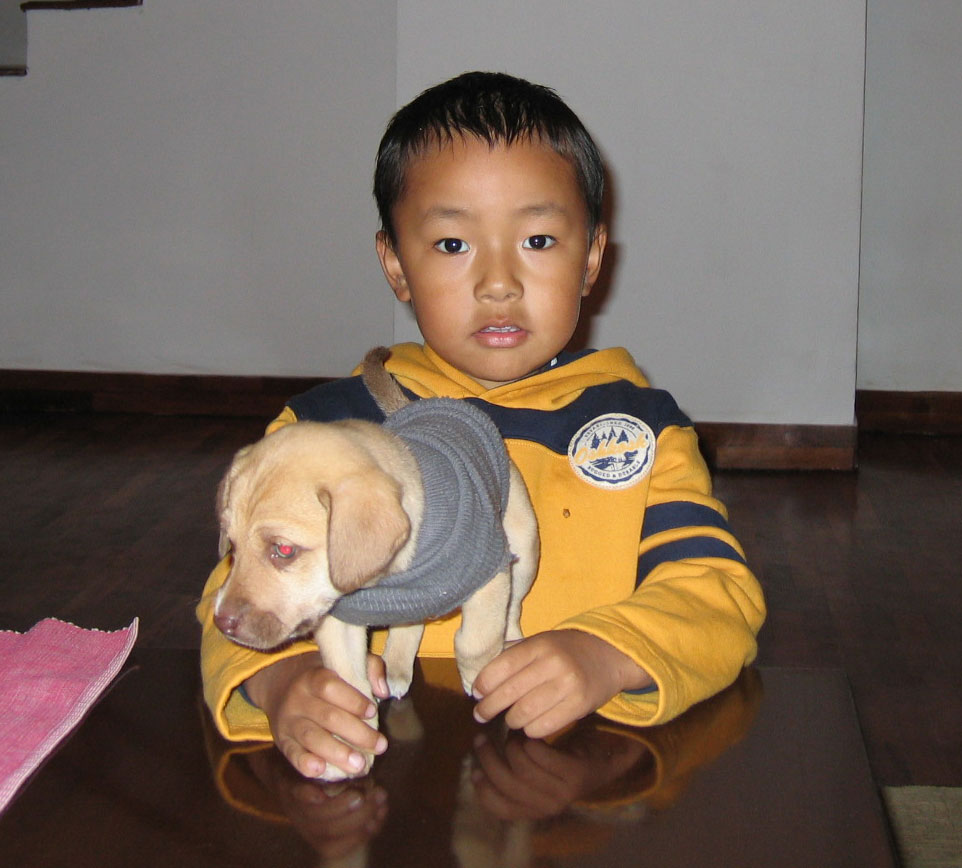
Yangsi Urgyen Rinpoche
