= Chokling Tersar =

Tibetan Buddhist text

In Tibetan Buddhism the Chokling Tersar (Tib. མཆོག་གླིང་གཏེར་གསར་ Wyl: mchog gling gter gsar.) are a collection of formerly hidden teachings or termas revealed by Chokgyur Lingpa, whose current reincarnations are Neten Chokling Rinpoche and Tsikey Chokling Rinpoche, whose foundation to propagate the Chokling Tersar is the Chokgyur Lingpa Foundation. These teachings were often revealed in combination with Jamyang Khyentse and Jamgon Kongtrul.
