= Ka-Nying Shedrub Ling =

Tibetan Buddhist monastery near Kathmandu, Nepal

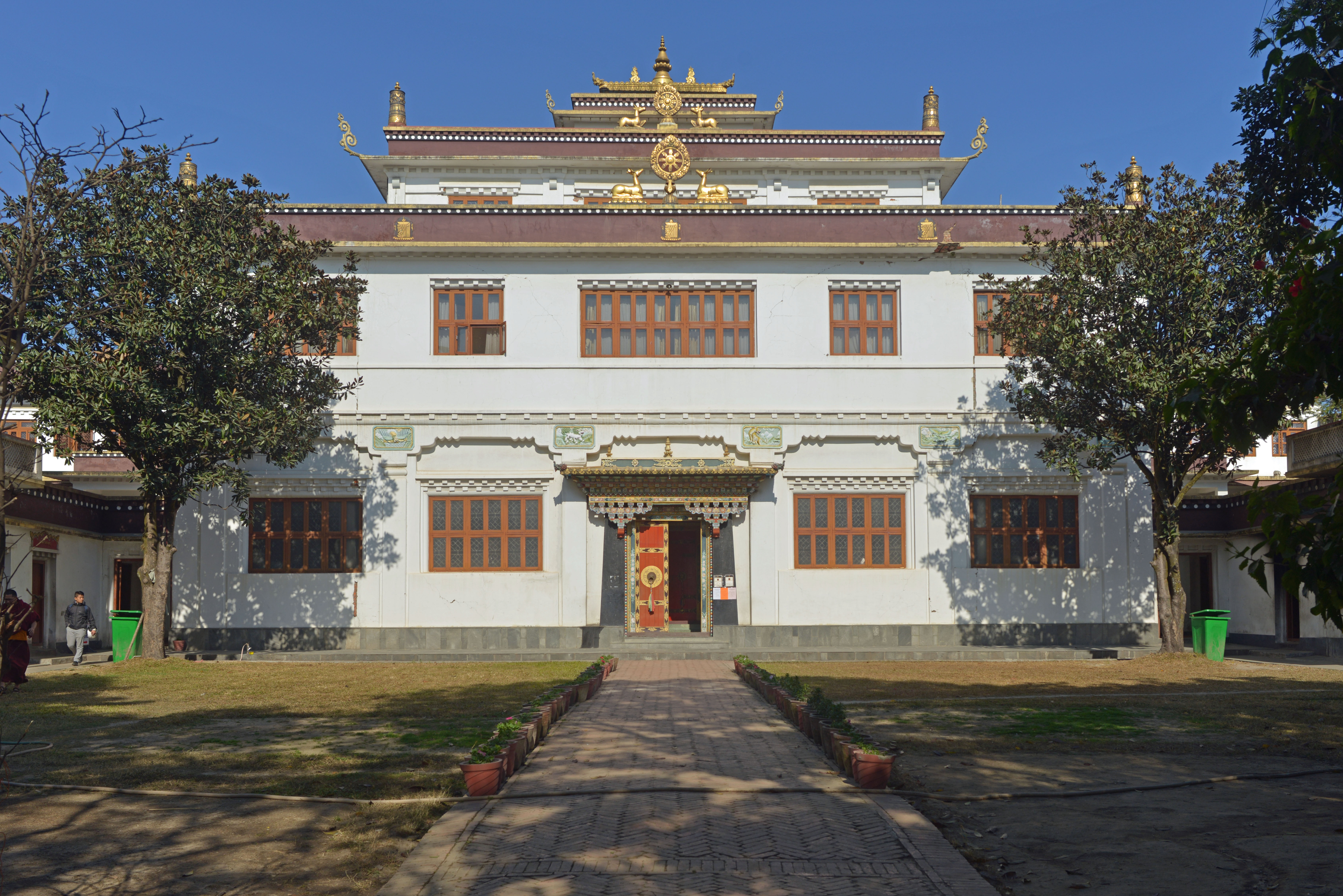
- The main temple at Ka-Nying Shedrub Ling

- Nepal

Religion
- Affiliation: Tibetan Buddhism
- Sect: Kagyu and Nyingma
- Leadership: Chökyi Nyima Rinpoche

Location
- Location: Boudhanath, Kathmandu
- Country: Nepal
- Interactive map of Ka-Nying Shedrub Ling
- Coordinates: 27°43′26.4″N 85°21′45.9″E

Architecture
- Founder: Tulku Urgyen Rinpoche
- Established: 1972

Ka-Nying Shedrub Ling is a Tibetan Buddhist monastery near Boudhanath, on the outskirts of Kathmandu, Nepal. It has ties to both the Kagyu and Nyingma schools, hence the combined Ka-Nying in the name. Shedrub Ling means "sanctuary for learning and practice."

== History ==
Based on the wishes of the 16th Karmapa, Tulku Urgyen Rinpoche and his family began construction of Ka-Nying Shedrub Ling Monastery in 1974. Upon its completion in the spring of 1976, King Birendra of Nepal performed the official inauguration. At that time, the Karmapa appointed Chökyi Nyima Rinpoche as abbot and his brother, Tsikey Chokling Rinpoche, as master of rituals. Gyalwang Karmapa then led the consecration ceremonies. Today, Kyabgön Phakchok Rinpoche - the oldest son of Tsikey Chokling Rinpoche - serves as the master of rituals.

== Rangjung Yeshe Institute ==
In 1997 the monastery established the Rangjung Yeshe Institute, a multi-year course in Tibetan language and Buddhist philosophy designed for Western dharma students. In 2001 RYI entered into a cooperation agreement with Kathmandu University to form the Center for Buddhist Studies whereby its students can be awarded BA, MA, PhD degrees from KU, with a major in "Buddhist Studies with Himalayan Language."

== Affiliated centers ==
Ka-Nying Shedrub Ling has several affiliated monasteries, nunneries, and retreat centers in the Himalayas as well as many projects in Europe, America, and Asia.

=== In Nepal ===
Lumbini's Thousand Buddha Temple, officially known as Pal Thubten Shedrub Ling is a monastery being built at the UNESCO heritage site where Buddha Shakyamuni was born in Lumbini, Nepal. It will have thousand Buddha statues to signify the thousand Buddhas of our time and to provide inspiration and a place for study and practice for many pilgrims.

Asura Cave Retreat Center nested in a cliff above Pharping in the southern part of the Kathmandu Valley. The cave has an ancient history as it was here the tantric master Padmasambhava attained realization. The retreat center in the area around the cave houses traditional three-year retreatants, pilgrim guests and other short-term retreats.

Nagi Gompa Nunnery nestled in the hills of Shivapuri National Park, was Kyabje Tulku Urgyen Rinpoche's main seat for many years. Now it serves as a place to live, study, and engage in short and long term retreats for nuns and lay sangha.

=== In Tibet ===
Drong Gompa located about 150 miles northeast of Lhasa, Drong Gompa is Chokyi Nyima Rinpoche's seat in Tibet. In recent years, it has been restored to its previous glory mostly based on the efforts of local devotees and generous benefactors.

== 2015 earthquake ==
During the two devastating earthquakes of April and May 2015, the original main temple suffered extensive damage and can no longer be used. A new temple has been designed and is planned to be built. During the earthquakes, the continuity of the practice was not interrupted, and the monastics performed the daily rituals and prayers in temporary shelters outside the temple, while also hosting hundreds of locals in need of food and shelter. Until the new temple is built, another building currently serves as the main shrine hall.
