= Dzogchen =

Tradition of teachings in Indo-Tibetan Buddhism

Tibetan name
- Tibetan: རྫོགས་ཆེན་
Transcriptions
- Wylie: rdzogs chen (rdzogs pa chen po)
- THL: Dzokchen
- Tibetan Pinyin: Zogqên
- Lhasa IPA: [tsɔktɕʰẽ]

Chinese name
- Traditional Chinese: 大究竟、 大圓滿、 大成就
- Simplified Chinese: 大究竟、 大圆满、 大成就
Transcriptions
Standard Mandarin
- Hanyu Pinyin: dàjiūjìng, dàyuánmǎn, dàchéngjiù

A white Tibetan letter A inside a rainbow thigle is a common symbol of Dzogchen. The Sanskrit letter A is also a common symbol for non-arising in Mahayana Buddhism.

Dzogchen (Tibetan: རྫོགས་ཆེན་, Wylie: rdzogs chen 'Great Completion' or 'Great Perfection'), also known as atiyoga (utmost yoga), is a tradition of teachings in Indo-Tibetan Buddhism and Bön aimed at discovering and remaining in the ultimate ground of existence. The goal of Dzogchen is the direct experience of this basis, called rigpa (Sanskrit: vidyā), the primordial state of any sentient being. Various Dzogchen lineages across the Nyingma, Sakya, Gelug, and Kagyu traditions teach specific contemplative practices for recognizing and stabilizing this state.

Dzogchen emerged during the first dissemination of Buddhism in Tibet, around the 7th to 9th centuries CE. While it is considered a Tibetan development by some scholars, it draws upon key ideas from Indian Buddhist sources, particularly Buddha-nature (''tathāgatagarbha'') doctrines, Yogācāra, and Madhyamak views on non-dual awareness, and Indian Vajrayāna literature such as the ''Guhyagarbha tantra''.

The earliest Dzogchen texts appeared in the 9th century, attributed to Indian masters. These texts, known as the Eighteen Great Scriptures, form the "Mind Series" and are attributed to figures like Śrī Siṅgha and Vimalamitra. Early Dzogchen was marked by a departure from normative Vajrayāna practices, focusing instead on simple calming contemplations leading to a direct immersion in awareness. During the Tibetan renaissance era (10th to early 12th century), Dzogchen expanded by incorporating new tantric practices and teachings from India. This period saw the emergence of new Dzogchen traditions like the "Instruction Class series" and the "Seminal Heart" (Tibetan: སྙིང་ཐིག་, Wylie: snying thig).

The classification of Dzogchen teachings and texts depends on the tradition. The Nyingma school divides them into three series: the Semdé (Mind Series, Tibetan: སེམས་སྡེ་, Wylie: sems sde), Longdé (Space Series, Tibetan: ཀློང་སྡེ་, Wylie: klong sde), and Menngaggidé (Instruction Series, Tibetan: མན་ངག་གི་སྡེ་, Wylie: man ngag gi sde). The Dzogchen teaching is structured around the Base, the Path, and the Fruit. The Base represents the original state of existence, characterized by emptiness (stong pa nyid), clarity (gsal ba, associated with luminous clarity), and unimpeded compassionate energy (snying rje). The Path involves gaining a direct understanding of the mind's pure nature through meditation and specific Dzogchen methods. The Fruit is the realization of one's true nature, leading to complete non-dual awareness and the dissolution of dualities.

Dzogchen practitioners aim for self-liberation (Tibetan: རང་གྲོལ་, Wylie: rang grol), where all experiences are integrated with awareness of one's true nature. This process may culminate in the attainment of a rainbow body at the moment of death, symbolizing full Buddhahood. Critics point to tensions between gradual and simultaneous practice within Dzogchen traditions, but practitioners argue these approaches cater to different levels of ability and understanding. Overall, Dzogchen offers a direct path to realizing the innate wisdom and compassion of the mind.

== History ==
Dzogchen arose in the era of the first dissemination of Buddhism in Tibet (7th to 9th centuries CE) during the Tibetan Empire and continued during the Era of Fragmentation (9th to 11th centuries). American Tibetologist David Germano argues that Dzogchen is likely a Tibetan Buddhist development. However, numerous ideas key to Dzogchen (like emptiness and luminosity) can be found in Indian sources, like the Buddhist tantras, buddha-nature literature and other Mahāyāna sources like the Laṅkāvatāra Sūtra. Furthermore, scholars like Sam van Schaik see Dzogchen as having arisen out of tantric Buddhist completion stage practices.

The earliest Dzogchen sources appeared in the first half of the 9th century, with a series of short texts attributed to Indian saints. The most of important of these are the "Eighteen Great Scriptures", which are today known as the "Mind Series" (Semdé) and are attributed to Indian masters like Śrī Siṅgha, Vairotsana and Vimalamitra. The later Semdé compilation tantra titled the All-Creating King (Kunjed Gyalpo, kun byed rgyal po) is one of the most important and widely quoted of all Dzogchen scriptures.

Germano sees the early Dzogchen of the Tibetan Empire period as characterized by the rejection of normative Vajrayana practice. Germano calls the early Dzogchen traditions "pristine Great Perfection" since it is marked "by the absence of presentations of detailed ritual and contemplative technique" as well as a lack of funerary, charnel ground and death imagery found in some Buddhist tantras. According to Germano, instead of tantric deity yoga methods, early Dzogchen mainly focused on simple calming (śamatha) contemplations leading to a "technique free immersion in the bare immediacy of one's own deepest levels of awareness". Similarly, Christopher Hatchell explains that since for early Dzogchen "all beings and all appearances are themselves the singular enlightened gnosis of the buddha All Good (Samantabhadra, Kuntu Zangpo)", there is nothing to do but to recognize this inherent awakened mind, relax and let go.

During the Tibetan renaissance era (10th century to the early 12th century) many new Vajrayāna texts, teachings and practices were introduced from India. At this time, the Nyingma school and its Dzogchen traditions reinvented themselves, producing many new scriptures and developing new practices influenced by the Sarma traditions. These new influences were absorbed into Dzogchen through the practice of finding treasure texts (terma) that were discovered by "treasure revealers" (tertons). These tantric elements included subtle body practices, visionary practices like dark retreat, and a focus on death-motifs and practices (such as funerary and relic rituals, bardo teachings, phowa, etc).

These new methods and teachings were part of several new traditions such as the "Secret Cycle" (gsang skor), "Ultra Pith" (yang tig), "Brahmin's tradition" (bram ze'i lugs), the "Space Class Series," and especially the "Instruction Class series" (Menngagde), which culminated in the "Seminal Heart" (snying thig), which emerged in the late 11th and early 12th century. The most influential texts in this period are Seventeen Tantras (rgyud bcu bdun). The most important scholarly figure in the systematization of these new traditions was Longchenpa Rabjampa (1308–1364).

Later figures who also revealed important treasure text cycles include Karma Lingpa, (1326–1386, who revealed the bar-do thos-grol), Rigdzin Gödem (1337–1409), Jigme Lingpa (1730–1798), who revealed the influential Longchen Nyingthig and Dudjom Lingpa (1835–1904).

== Etymology and concepts ==
Dzogchen is composed of two terms:

- rdzogs – perfection, completion
- chen – great

According to the fourteenth Dalai Lama, the term dzogchen may be a rendering of the Sanskrit term mahāsandhi.

The term initially referred to the "highest perfection" of Vajrayāna deity yoga. Specifically, it refers to the stage after the deity visualization has been dissolved and one rests in the natural state of the innately luminous and pure mind. According to Sam van Schaik, in the 8th-century tantra Sarvabuddhasamāyoga, the term refers to "a realization of the nature of reality" which arises through the practice of tantric anuyoga practices which produce bliss. In the 10th and 11th centuries, when Dzogchen emerged as a separate vehicle to liberation in the Nyingma tradition, the term was used synonymously with the Sanskrit term ati yoga (primordial yoga).

=== Rigpa (knowledge) and ma rigpa (delusion) ===
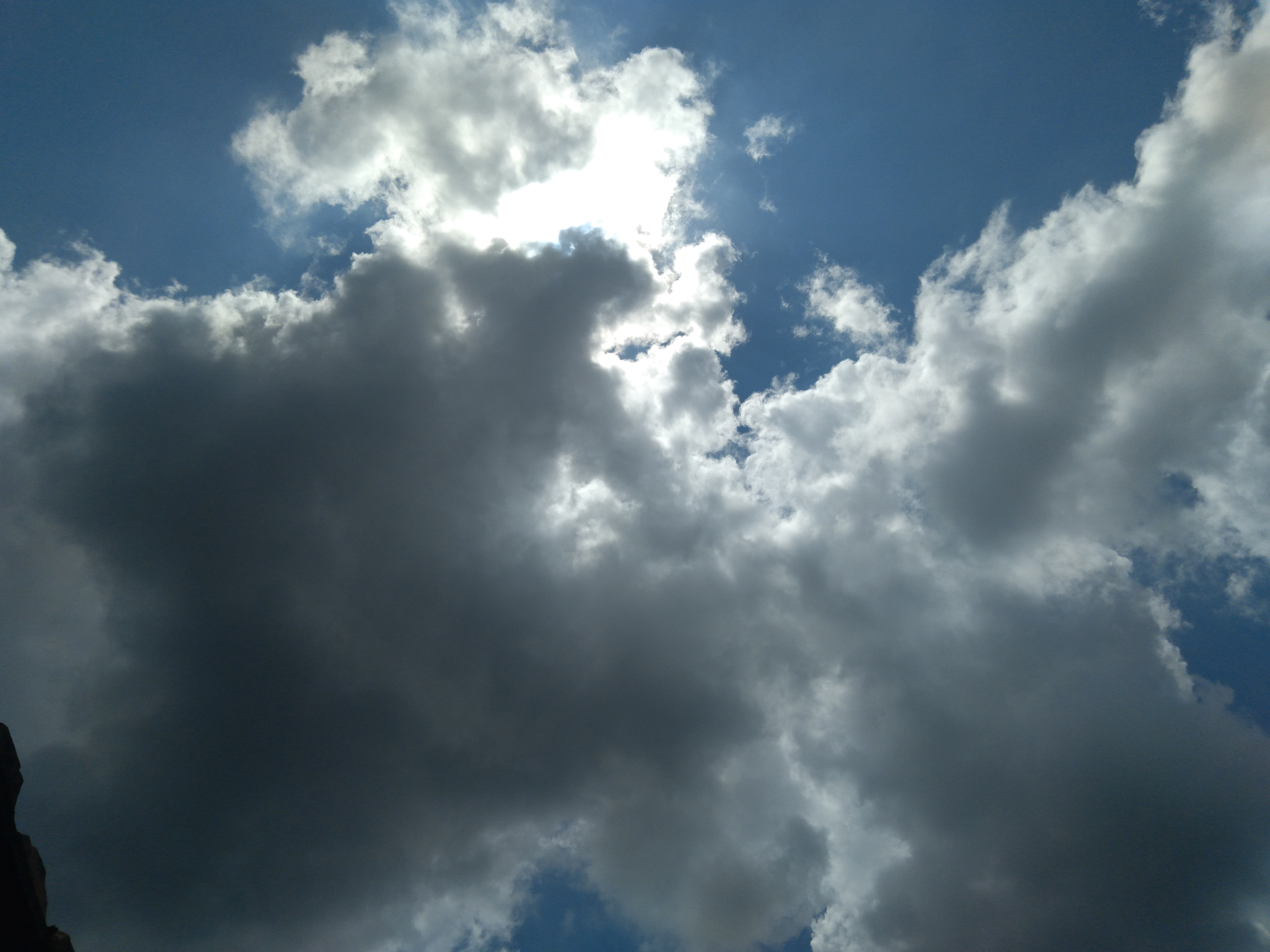
A widespread metaphor for ignorance is the obscuration of the sun by clouds.

Rigpa (Sanskrit: vidyā, "knowledge") is a central concept in Dzogchen. According to Ācārya Malcolm Smith:

A text from the Heart Essence of Vimalamitra called the Lamp Summarizing Vidyā (Rig pa bsdus pa’i sgronma) defines vidyā in the following way: "...vidyā is knowing, clear, and unchanging" In Sanskrit, the term vidyā and all its cognates imply consciousness, knowing, knowledge, science, intelligence, and so on. Simply put, vidyā means unconfused knowledge of the basis that is its own state.

Ma rigpa (avidyā) is the opposite of rigpa or knowledge. Ma rigpa is ignorance, delusion, or unawareness, the failure to recognize the nature of the basis. An important theme in Dzogchen texts is explaining how ignorance arises from the basis or dharmatā, which is associated with ye shes or pristine consciousness. Automatically arising unawareness (lhan skyes ma rig pa) exists because the basis has a natural cognitive potentiality which gives rise to appearances. This is the ground for saṁsāra and nirvāṇa.

=== Traditional exegesis ===
The Mirror of the Heart of Vajrasattva (Dorje Sempa Nyinggi Melong, rdo rje sems dpa' snying gi me long), a major Dzogchen tantra, explains the term Dzog (Perfection) as follows:

Because rigpa is perfect wisdom in the realm beyond effort, it is perfection. Because meditation is perfect stainless wisdom in the realm beyond concepts, it is perfection. Because behavior is perfect universal wisdom in the realm beyond correction, it is perfection. Because view is perfect non-conceptual wisdom in the realm beyond achievement, it is perfection. Because fruit is the perfect twenty-five wisdoms in the realm beyond frame of reference, it is perfection.

The Mirror of the Heart of Vajrasattva explains that Dzogchen is "great" because:

- It is the pinnacle of all vehicles, views, meditations, behaviors, goals.
- It is "never moving from the natural state."
- It functions "without obstacles in the realm beyond change."
- It manifests "beyond concepts in the realm beyond attachment."
- It manifests "without attachment in the realm beyond desire"
- It manifests "in great bliss in the realm beyond speech."
- It is "the source that pervades pure enlightenment."
- It is "non-substantial rigpa beyond action and effort."
- It remains "in equality without moving from the realm of total bliss" and "without moving from the essential meaning."
- It exists "everywhere without being a dimension of grasping."
- It is "the essence of everything without being established with words and syllables."

== Three series ==
The Three Series of Dzogchen (Tibetan: རྫོགས་ཆེན་སྡེ་གསུམ་, Wylie: rdzogs chen sde gsum) are a traditional Tibetan Buddhist classification which divides the teachings of the Nyingma school's Dzogchen tradition into three series, divisions or sections. These three are: the Semde ('Mind Series'), the Longdé ('Space Series') and the Menngagde ('Instruction Series'). Traditional accounts of the Nyingma school attribute this schema to the Indian master Mañjuśrīmitra (c. 8th century).

According to modern Tibetologists, this doxographic schema actually developed in the literature of the Instruction Series (c. 11th century onwards) as a way to distinguish and categorize the various Dzogchen teachings at the time. According to Instruction Series texts, the Mind Series is based on understanding that one's own mind is the basis of all appearances and that this basis, called mind itself, is empty and luminous. The Space series meanwhile is focused on emptiness (Skt. śūnyatā, T. stong-pa nyid). Finally, the Instruction Series itself is seen as the most direct kind of realization, without the need to meditate on emptiness or mind. Over time, the Instruction Series came to dominate the Dzogchen tradition and it remains the series that is most widely practiced and taught while the other two series are rarely practiced today (with the exception of a few masters like Namkhai Norbu).

According to Namkhai Norbu, the three series are three modes of presenting and introducing the state of Dzogchen. Norbu states that Mennagde is a more direct form of introduction, Longde is closely associated with symbolic forms of introducing Dzogchen and Semde is more focused on oral forms of introduction. Germano writes that the Mind Series serves as a classification for the earlier texts and forms of Dzogchen "prior to the development of the Seminal Heart movements" which focused on meditations based on tantric understandings of bodhicitta (byang chub kyi sems). This referred to the ultimate nature of the mind, which is empty (stong pa), luminous ('od gsal ba), and pure. According to Germano, the Space and Instruction Series are associated with later (historical) developments of Dzogchen "which increasingly experimented with re-incorporating tantric contemplative techniques centered on the body and vision, as well as the consequent philosophical shifts his became interwoven with."

== Base, Path, and Fruit ==
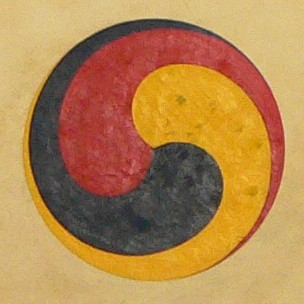
A gankyil, a Tibetan symbol which can symbolize various triple part ideas, such as the ground, path and fruit

In Dzogchen, there are three central aspects: the Base, the Path and the Fruit. The Base represents the original, unchanging state of existence, characterized by emptiness, clarity, and compassionate energy.

The Path comprises three key elements: view, practice, and conduct. The view focuses on gaining a direct understanding of the pure nature of the mind. Practice involves meditation techniques and specific Dzogchen methods. Conduct means integrating these practices into daily life.

The Fruit represents the ultimate goal – realizing one's true nature and achieving Buddhahood. This involves discovering the inherent state of the base and integrating all experiences with one's awareness of it. Ultimately, it leads to complete non-dual awareness, transcending egoic limitations, and dissolving dualities.

=== The Base or Ground ===
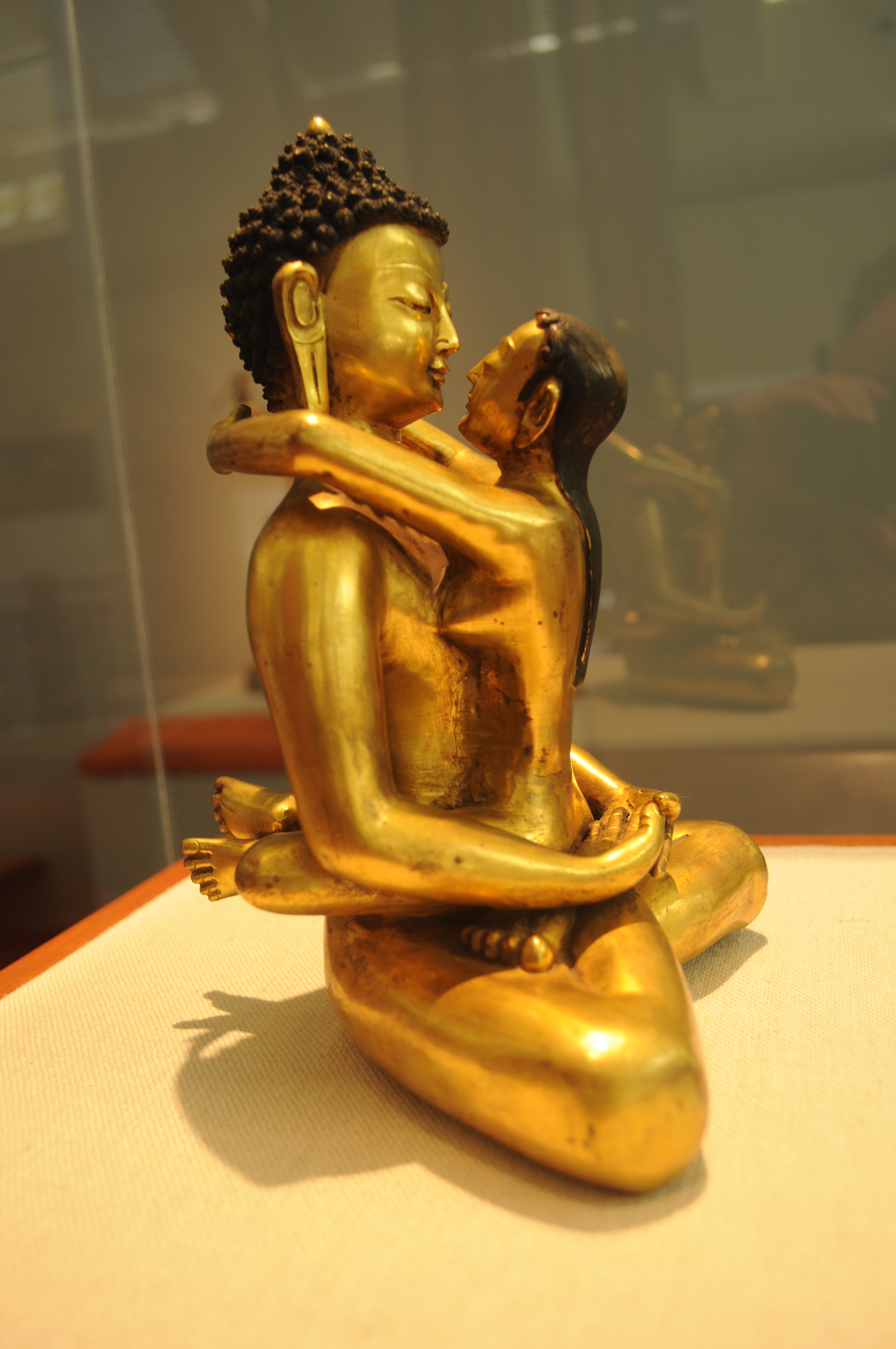
An image of the Primordial Buddha Samantabhadra with his consort Samantabhadri. These images are said to symbolize the union of space (emptiness, the female aspect) and clarity - awareness (male).

A key concept in Dzogchen is the "base", "ground", or "primordial state" (Tibetan: gzhi, Sanskrit: āśraya), also called the general ground (spyi gzhi) or the original ground (gdod ma'i gzhi). The basis is the original state "before realization produced buddhas and nonrealization produced sentient beings". It is atemporal and unchanging and yet it is "noetically potent", giving rise to mind (sems, Skt. citta), consciousness (shes pa, Skt. vijñāna), delusion (ma rig pa, Skt. avidyā) and knowledge (rigpa, Skt. vidyā). Furthermore, Hatchell notes that the Dzogchen tradition portrays ultimate reality as something which is "beyond the concepts of one and many."

==== Three qualities ====
According to the Dzogchen-teachings, the Ground or Buddha-nature has three qualities:

- ngo bo, "essence", oneness or emptiness (Wylie: ngo bo stong pa),
- rang bzhin, "nature", luminosity, lucidity or clarity (as in the luminous mind of the Five Pure Lights) (Wylie: rang bzhin gsal ba),
- thugs rje, "power", universal compassionate energy (Wylie: thugs rje kun khyab), unobstructed (Wylie: ma 'gags pa).

Herbert V. Guenther points out that this Ground is both a static potential and a dynamic unfolding. They give a process-orientated translation, to avoid any essentialist associations, since

ngo-bo (facticity) has nothing to do with nor can even be reduced to the (essentialist) categories of substance and quality; [...] rang-bzhin (actuality) remains open-dimensional, rather than being or turning into a rigid essence despite its being what it is; and that thugs-rje (resonance) is an atemporal sensitivity and response, rather than a distinct and narrowly circumscribed operation.

The 19th–20th-century Tibetan Buddhist scholar, Shechen Gyaltsap Gyurme Pema Namgyal, sees the Buddha-nature as ultimate truth, nirvana, which is constituted of profundity, primordial peace and radiance:

Buddha-nature is immaculate. It is profound, serene, unfabricated suchness, an uncompounded expanse of luminosity; nonarising, unceasing, primordial peace, spontaneously present nirvana.

==== Direct introduction ====
Direct introduction is called the "Empowerment of Awareness" (Wylie: rig pa'i rtsal dbang, pronounced "rigpay sall wahng"), a technical term employed within the Dzogchen lineages for a particular lineage of empowerment propagated by Jigme Lingpa. This empowerment consists of the direct introduction of the student to the intrinsic nature of their own mind-essence, rigpa, by their empowering master.

==== Pointing-out instruction ====
In Dzogchen tradition, pointing-out instruction (Tibetan: ངོ་སྤྲོད་ཀྱི་གདམས་པ་, Wylie: ngo sprod kyi gdams pa, THL: ngo-trö kyi dam-pa) is also referred to as "pointing out the nature of mind" (Tibetan: སེམས་ཀྱི་ངོ་སྤྲོད་, Wylie: sems kyi ngo sprod, THL: sem kyi ngo-trö), "pointing out transmission", or "introduction to the nature of mind". The pointing-out instruction (ngo sprod) is an introduction to the nature of mind.

=== The Path ===
There are three major divisions of the Dzogchen path, known as the "Three Dharmas of the Path." These are tawa, gompa, and chöpa. Namkhai Norbu translates these three terms as 'view,' 'practice,' and 'conduct.'

==== Garab Dorje's three statements ====
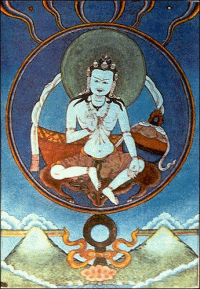
Garab Dorje (c. 665), an Indian sage purportedly from Oddiyana. He is traditionally held to be the first human teacher of Dzogchen.

Garab Dorje (c. 665) epitomized the Dzogchen teaching in three principles, known as "Striking the Vital Point in Three Statements" (Tsik Sum Né Dek), said to be his last words. They give in short the development a student has to undergo:

Garab Dorje's three statements were integrated into the Nyingthig traditions, the most popular of which in the Longchen Nyingthig by Jigme Lingpa (1730–1798). The statements are:

1. Introducing directly the face of rigpa itself (ngo rang tok tu tré). Dudjom Rinpoche states this refers to: "Introducing directly the face of the naked mind as the rigpa itself, the innate primordial wisdom."
2. Deciding upon one thing and one thing only (tak chik tok tu ché). Dudjom states: "Because all phenomena, whatever manifests, whether saṃsāra or nirvāṇa, are none other than the rigpa’s own play, there is complete and direct decision that there is nothing other than the abiding of the continual flow of rigpa."
3. Confidence directly in the liberation of rising thoughts (deng drol tok tu cha). Dudjom comments: "In the recognition of namtok [arising thoughts], whatever arises, whether gross or subtle, there is direct confidence in the simultaneity of the arising and dissolution in the expanse of dharmakāya, which is the unity of rigpa and śūnyatā."

==== View ====
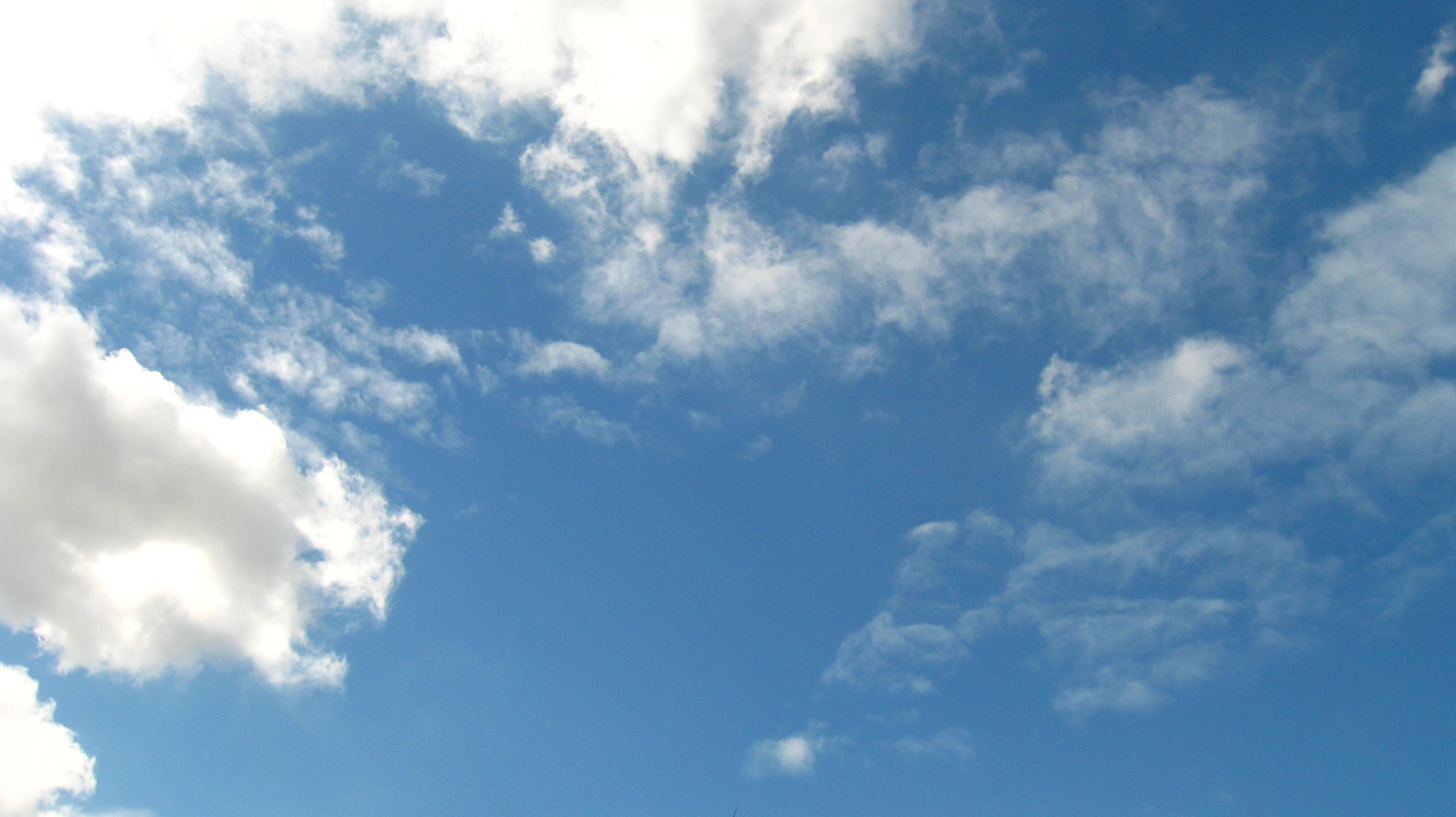
The metaphors of sky and spaciousness are often used to describe the nature of mind in Dzogchen.

Nyingma Dzogchen texts use unique terminology to describe the Dzogchen view (Tib. tawa). Some of these terms deal with the different elements and features of the mind and are drawn from classic Buddhist thought. The generic term for consciousness is shes pa (Skt. vijñāna), and includes the six sense consciousnesses. Worldly, impure and dualistic forms of consciousness are generally referred to with terms such as sems (citta, mind), yid (mānas) and blo (buddhi). On the other hand, nirvanic or liberated forms of consciousness are described with terms such as ye shes (jñāna, 'pristine consciousness') and shes rab (prajñā, wisdom). According to Sam van Schaik, two significant terms used in Dzogchen literature is the ground (gzhi) and gnosis (rig pa), which represent the "ontological and gnoseological aspects of the nirvanic state" respectively.

Nyingma Dzogchen literature also describes nirvana as the "expanse" or "space" (klong or dbyings) or the "expanse of Dharma" (chos dbyings, Sanskrit: Dharmadhatu). The term Dharmakaya (Dharma body) is also often associated with these terms in Dzogchen, as explained by Tulku Urgyen:

Dharmakaya is like space. You cannot say there is any limit to space in any direction. No matter how far you go, you never reach a point where space stops and that is the end of space. Space is infinite in all directions; so is dharmakaya. Dharmakaya is all-pervasive and totally infinite, beyond any confines or limitations. This is so for the dharmakaya of all buddhas. There is no individual dharmakaya for each buddha, as there is no individual space for each country.

The Dzogchen View of the secret instruction series (man ngag sde) is classically explained through the eleven vajra topics. These can be found in the String of Pearls Tantra (Mu tig phreng ba), the Great Commentary by Vimalamitra as well as in Longchenpa's Treasury of Word and Meaning (Tsik Dön Dzö).

==== Practice ====
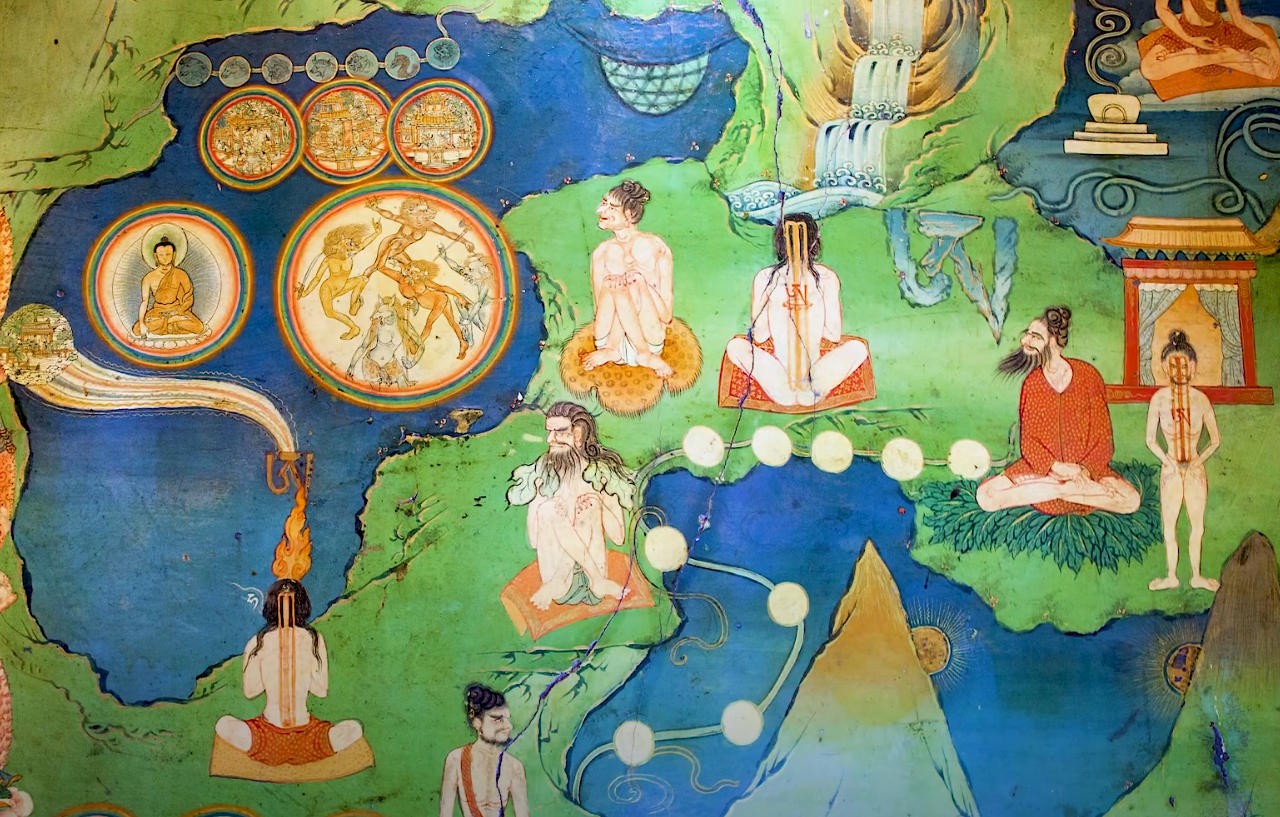
Lukhang Temple mural depicting Dzogchen anuyoga practices such as tummo which work with the subtle body channels

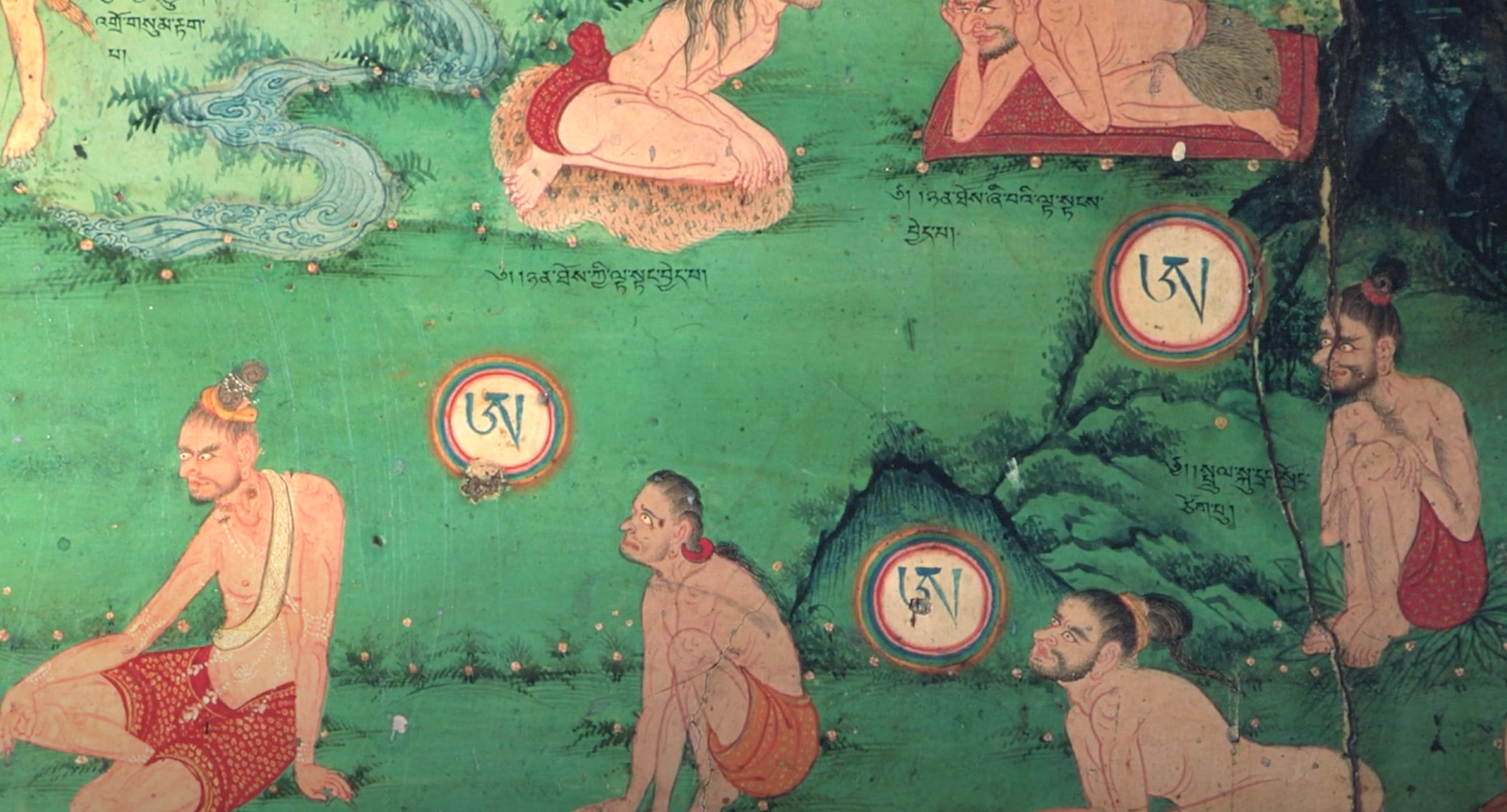
Yogis meditating on the letter A inside a thigle (circular rainbow), Lukhang Temple

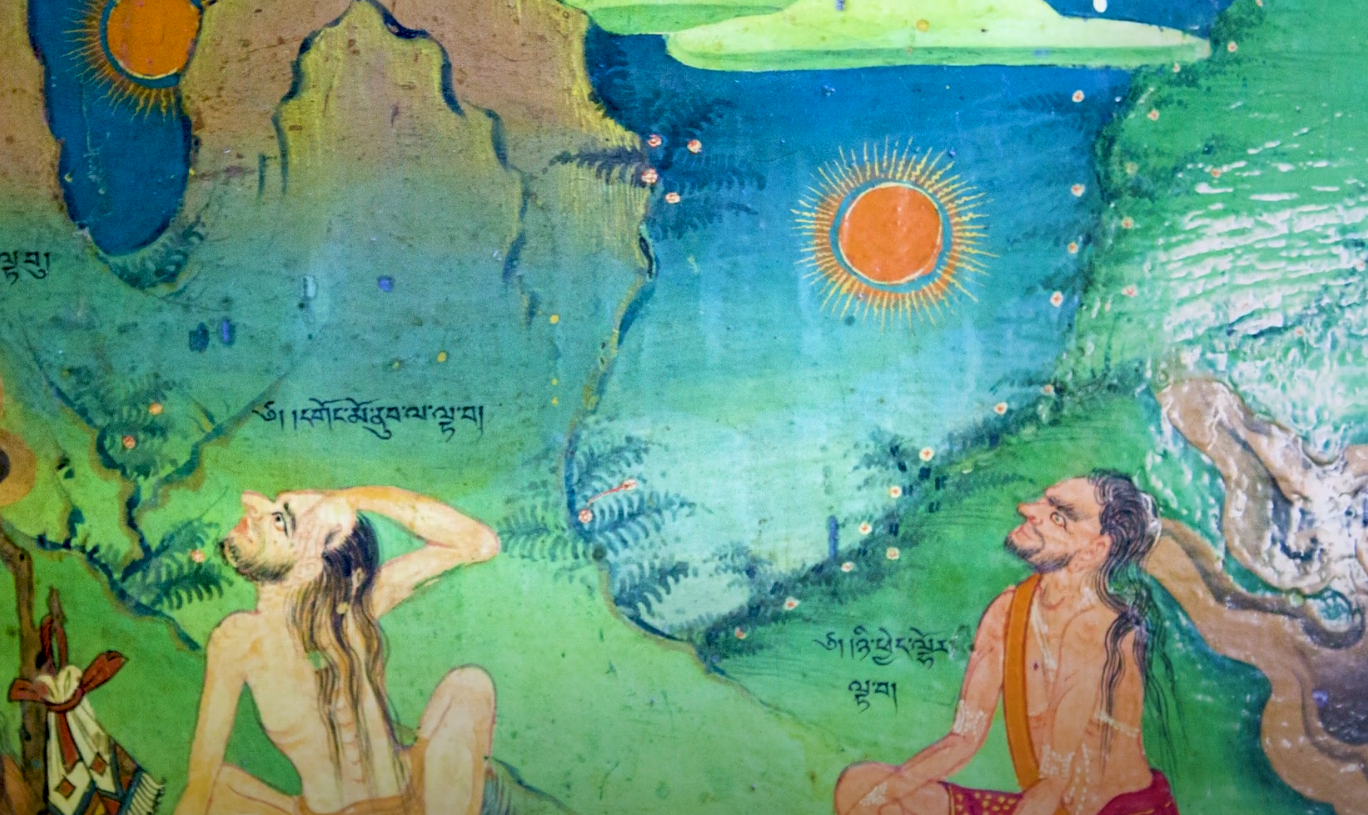
Lukhang Temple mural depicting the visionary tögal practice of sky gazing.

Dzogchen practice (gom) relies on the Dzogchen view which is a "direct, non-dual, non-conceptual knowledge" of the pure nature. This is achieved through one's relationship with a guru or lama who introduces one to our own primordial state and provides instruction on how to practice. This "direct introduction" and transmission from a Dzogchen master is considered absolutely essential.

The Dzogchen tradition contains numerous systems of practices, including various forms of meditation, tantric yogas and unique Dzogchen methods. The earliest form of Dzogchen practice (the Semde, "Mind" series) generally emphasized non-symbolic "formless" practices (as opposed to tantric deity yoga).

Later developments led to the main Dzogchen practices becoming more infused with various preliminary and tantric methods like deity yoga, semdzin (holding the mind), rushen (separating samsara and nirvana), and vipasyana (lhagthong), which are all seen as skillful means to achieve the basic state of contemplation of the primordially pure state.

The key Dzogchen meditation methods, which are unique to the tradition are trekchö ("cutting tension") and tögal, along with unique Dzogchen teachings on awakening in the bardo (intermediate state between death and rebirth). In trekchö, one first identifies the innate pure awareness, and then sustains recognition of it in all activities. In tögal ("crossing over"), a yogi works with various gazes and postures which lead to various forms of visions (in dark retreat or through sky gazing).

The most comprehensive study of sky-gazing meditation, known as tögal or thod rgal, has been written by Flavio A. Geisshuesler. Although the term thod rgal is generally translated as "Direct Transcendence" or "Leap Over," Geisshuesler argues that the expression really means "Skullward Leap" as it consists of the Tibetan words thod ("above," "over," but also "head wrapper," "turban," "skull") and rgal ("to leap over"). In the larger Tibetan cultural area, it is the most elevated part of the human body—the skull or, its extension in the form of a turban-like headdress—that allows the religious practitioner to gain access to the source of vitality located in the heavens. Both the head and the headdress have deep resonances with animals—particularly deer and sheep—which are central for the sky-gazing practice because of their ability to ascend and descend vertically to move in between various realms of existence.

==== Conduct ====
Norbu notes that "Tantric practices may be used as secondary practices by the practitioner of Dzogchen, alongside the principal practice of contemplation." Similarly, physical yoga (Tib. trulkhor) may also be used as supporting practices.

=== The Fruit ===
==== Self-liberation ====
According to Namkhai Norbu, in Dzogchen, "to become realized simply means to discover and manifest that which from the very beginning has been our own true condition: the Zhi (gzhi) or Base." Since the basis, the path of practice and the fruit or result of practice are non-dual from the ultimate perspective, in Dzogchen understands the path as not separate from the result or fruit of the path (i.e. Buddhahood). Once a Dzogchen practitioner has recognized their true nature (and "do not remain in doubt" regarding this), the path consists of the integration (sewa) of all experiences in their life with the state of rigpa. All these experiences are self-liberated ('auto-liberated') through this integration or mixing.

This process is often explained through three "liberations" or capacities of a Dzogchen practitioner:

- Cherdrol ("one observes and it liberates") - This is when an ordinary appearance occurs and one sees its true nature, which leads to its self-liberation. It is compared to how a drop of dew evaporates when the sunlight shines on it.
- Shardrol ("as soon as it arises it liberates itself") - This occurs when any sense contact or passion arises self-liberates automatically and effortlessly. This is compared to how snow melts immediately on falling into the sea.
- Rangdrol ("of itself it liberates itself"), according to Norbu, this is "completely non-dual and all-at-once, instantaneous self-liberation. Here the illusory separation of subject and object collapses of itself, and one's habitual vision, the limited cage, the trap of ego, opens out into the spacious vision of what is". The simile used here is a snake effortlessly unwinding its own body.

Advanced Dzogchen practitioners are also said to sometimes manifest supranormal knowledge (Skt. abhijñā, Tib. mngon shes), such as clairvoyance and telepathy.

==== Rainbow body ====
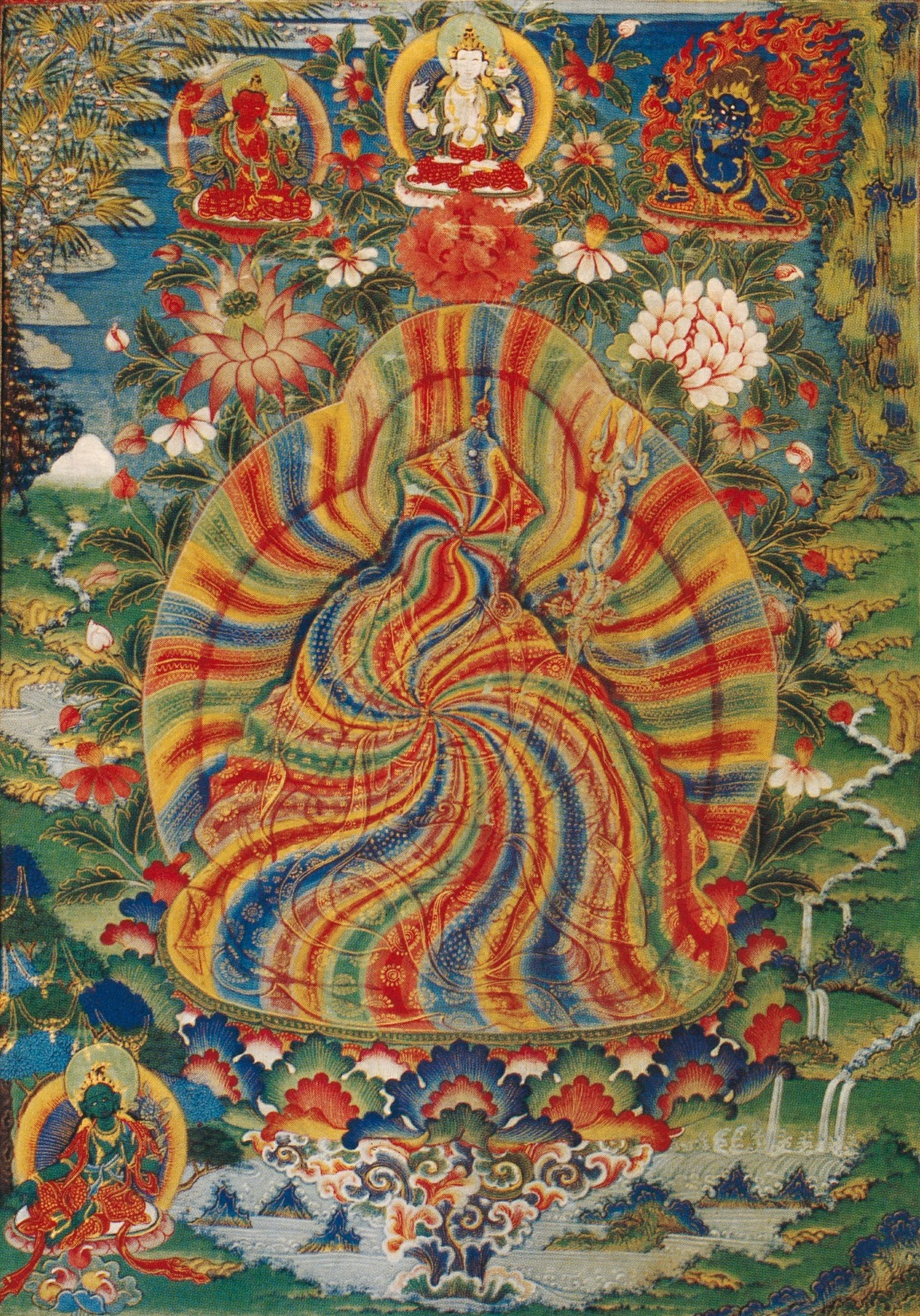
19th century thangka depicting Padmasambhava's rainbow body.

Tögal practice may lead to full Buddhahood and the self-liberation of the human body into a rainbow body (Note: Wylie: 'ja' lus, pronounced Jalü) at the moment of death, when all fixation and grasping has been exhausted. Tibetan Buddhism holds that the rainbow body is a nonmaterial body of light with the ability to exist and abide wherever and whenever as pointed by one's compassion. It is a manifestation of the sambhogakāya and its attainment is said to be accompanied by the appearance of lights and rainbows.

Some exceptional practitioners are held to have realized a higher type of rainbow body without dying (these include the 24 Bön masters from the oral tradition of Zhang Zhung, Tapihritsa, Padmasambhava, and Vimalamitra). Having completed the four visions before death, the individual focuses on the lights that surround the fingers. His or her physical body self-liberates into a nonmaterial body of light with the ability to exist and abide wherever and whenever as pointed by one's compassion.

== Critique ==
=== Simultaneous and gradual practice ===
As noted by van Schaik, there is a tension in the Longchen Nyingtik tradition of Dzogchen between methods which emphasize gradual practice and attainments, and methods which emphasize primordial liberation, simultaneous enlightenment, and non-activity. This seeming contradiction is explained by authors of the tradition as being related to the different levels of ability of different practitioners.

For example, the works of Jigme Lingpa contain criticisms of methods which rely on cause and effect as well as methods that rely on intellectual analysis. Since Buddhahood is uncaused and transcendent of the intellect, these contrived and conceptual meditations are contrasted with "effortless" and "instantaneous" approaches in the works of Jigme Lingpa, who writes that as soon as a thought arises, it is to be seen nakedly, without analysis or examination. Similarly, a common theme of Dzogchen literature is the elevation of Dzogchen above all other "lower" ('og ma) vehicles and a criticism of these lower vehicles which are seen as inferior (dman pa) approaches.

In spite of these critiques, Dzogchen cycles like Jigme Lingpa's Longchen Nyingthig do contain numerous practices which are not instantaneous or effortless, such as tantric Mahayoga practice like deity yoga and preliminary methods such as ngondro (which are equated with the path of accumulation). Furthermore, Jigme Lingpa and Longchenpa also criticize those who teach the simultaneous method to everyone and teach them to dispense with all other methods at once.

In response to the idea that the gradualist teachings found in the Longchen Nyingtik texts contradict the Dzogchen view of primordial liberation, Jigme Lingpa states:

This is not correct because Vajradhara using his skill in means, taught according to the categories of best, middling, and worst faculties, subdivided into the nine levels from sravaka to atiyoga. Although the Great Perfection is the path for those of the sharpest faculties, entrants are not composed exclusively of those types. With this in mind, having ascertained the features of the middling and inferior faculties of awareness holders, the tradition was established in this way.

This division of practices according to level of ability is also found in Longchenpa's Tegchö Dzö. However, as van Schaik notes, "the system should not be taken too literally. It is likely that all three types of instruction contained in the threefold structure of YL [Yeshe Lama] would be given to any one person." Therefore, though the instructions would be given to all student types, the actual capacity of the practitioner would determine how they would attain awakening (through Dzogchen meditation, in the bardo of death, or through transference of consciousness). Jigme Lingpa also believed that students of the superior faculties were extremely rare. He held that for most people, a gradual path of training is what is needed to reach realization.

== See also ==
Teachers

- Chagdud Tulku Rinpoche
- Dilgo Khyentse
- Dudjom Rinpoche
- Dzogchen Rinpoche
- Dzongsar Khyentse Chökyi Lodrö
- Jigme Phuntsok

- Lopön Tenzin Namdak
- Namkhai Norbu Rinpoche
- Nyoshul Khenpo Rinpoche
- Sherab Zangpo
- Sogyal Rinpoche
- Tharchin Rinpoche
- Tulku Urgyen

Terms

- Ganachakra
- Lukhang
- Mahamudra
- Ngagpa
- Trul khor
- Tukdam

== Sources ==
=== Historical Dzogchen texts ===
- Dudjom Rinpoche, Kyabje (2009), "Summary of Striking the Vital Point in Three Statements", Lotsawa House
- Patrul Rinpoche (2008), "The Special Teaching of the Wise and Glorious King", Lotsawa House
- Ricard, Matthieu (2001), The Life of Shabkar: The Autobiography of a Tibetan Yogin, Ithaca: Snow Lion Publications
- Reynolds, John Myrdhin (2005), The Oral Tradition from Zhang-Zhung: An Introduction to the Bonpo Dzogchen Teachings of the Oral Tradition from Zhang-Zhung Known as the Zhang-zhung snyan-rgyud, Vajra Publications, ISBN 978-99946-644-4-3
- Valby, Jim (2016), Ornament of the State of Samantabhadra - Commentary on the All-Creating King - Pure Perfect Presence - Great Perfection of All Phenomena. Volume One, 2nd Edition, Jim Valby Publications, ISBN 978-0-9822854-0-4

=== Contemporary Buddhist sources ===
- Anon (2005), "Biographies: Pramodavajra, Regent of the Divine", Dharma Fellowship of His Holiness the Gwayala Karmapa, archived from the original on 2020-02-04
- Chökyi Nyima Rinpoche (1994), Union of Mahamudra and Dzogchen, Rangjung Yeshe Publications
- Dahl, Cortland (2009), Entrance to the Great Perfection: A Guide to the Dzogchen Preliminary Practices, Snow Lion Publications
- Dalai Lama (2004), Dzogchen | Heart Essence of the Great Perfection, Snow Lion Publications, ISBN 978-1-55939-219-8
- Dudjom Rinpoche (1991), The Nyingma School of Tibetan Buddhism, Vol. 1, Wisdom Publications, ISBN 978-0-86171-087-4
- Dudjom Rinpoche (2005), Wisdom Nectar: Dudjom Rinpoché's Heart Advice, Ithaca: Snow Lion Publications
- Kunsang, Erik Pema (2012), Wellsprings of the Great Perfection: The Lives and Insights of the Early Masters, Rangjung Yeshe Publications, ISBN 978-962-7341-81-9
- Norbu, Namkhai (2000), The Crystal and the Way of Light: Sutra, Tantra, and Dzogchen, Snow Lion Publications
- Norbu, Namkhai (2012). Small Glossary for the Dzogchen Community. Shang Shung Edizioni.
- Nyoshul Khenpo (2016), "Chapter 6", The Fearless Lion's Roar: Profound Instructions on Dzogchen, the Great Perfection, Shambhala Publications
- Rabjam, Shechen (2007), The Great Medicine: Steps in Meditation on the Enlightened Mind, Boston: Shambhala
- Ray, Reginald (2001), Secret of the Vajra World: The Tantric Buddhism of Tibet, Shambhala Publications, ISBN 978-1-57062-772-9
- Stewart MacKenzie, Jampa (2014), The Life of Longchenpa: The Omniscient Dharma King of the Vast Expanse, Shambhala
- Tenzin Wangyal Rinpoche (2000), Wonders of the Natural Mind: The Essence of Dzogchen in the Native Bon Tradition of Tibet, Snow Lion Publications

=== Academic sources ===
- Achard, Jean-Luc (2015), "The View of spyi-ti yoga", Revue d'Études Tibétaines, CNRS: 1–20 ⟨halshs-01244881⟩
- Buswell, Robert; Lopez, Donald S. Jr., eds. (2014). The Princeton Dictionary of Buddhism. Princeton University Press. ISBN 978-0-691-15786-3.
- Geisshuesler, Flavio (2024), Tibetan Sky-Gazing Meditation and the Pre-History of Great Perfection Buddhism, London: Bloomsbury Publishing, ISBN 978-1-350-42881-2
- Germano, David F. (Winter 1994), "Architecture and Absence in the Secret Tantric History of rDzogs Chen", The Journal of the International Association of Buddhist Studies, 17 (2): 203–335
- Germano, David (2005), "Dzogchen", in Jones, Lindsay (ed.), Macmillan Encyclopedia of Religion. Vol.4: Dacian Riders – Esther, MacMillan Reference USA
- Germano, David (October 2005b), "The Funerary Transformation of the Great Perfection (Rdzogs chen)", Journal of the International Association of Tibetan Studies (1): 1–54
- Goodman, Steven D.; Davidson, Ronald M. (1992), Tibetan Buddhism: reason and revelation, SUNY Press, ISBN 0-7914-0785-3
- Hatchell, Christopher (2014), Naked Seeing The Great Perfection, the Wheel of Time, and Visionary Buddhism in Renaissance Tibet, Oxford University Press
- Hayward, Jeremy (2008), Warrior-King of Shambhala: Remembering Chögyam Trungpa, Boston: Wisdom Publications, ISBN 978-0-86171-546-6
- Irons, Edward A. (2008), "Dzogchen", in Irons, Edward A. (ed.), Encyclopedia of Buddhism, Facts On File, Inc. An imprint of Infobase Publishing
- Keown, Damien (2003), A Dictionary of Buddhism, Oxford University Press, ISBN 978-0-19-860560-7
- Pettit, John Whitney (1999), Mipham's beacon of certainty: illuminating the view of Dzogchen, the Great Perfection, Boston: Wisdom Publications, ISBN 978-0-86171-157-4
- Smith, Malcolm (2016), Buddhahood in This Life: The Great Commentary by Vimalamitra, Simon and Schuster
- van Schaik, Sam (2004), Approaching the Great Perfection: Simultaneous and Gradual Methods of Dzogchen Practice in the Longchen Nyingtig, Wisdom Publications
- van Schaik, Sam (August 3, 2011), "Early Dzogchen IV: the role of Atiyoga", EarlyTibet.com
