= Orgyen Chokgyur Lingpa =

- Orgyen Chokgyur Dechen Lingpa
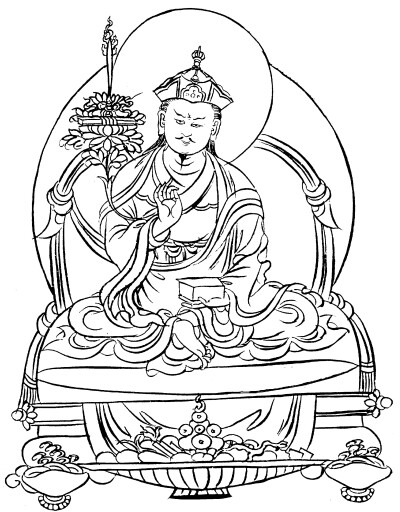

Tibetan name
- Tibetan: ཨོ་རྒྱན་མཆོག་གྱུར་བདེ་ཆེན་གླིང་པ་
Transcriptions
- Wylie: o rgyan mchog gyur bde chen gling pa

Chokgyur Lingpa or Chokgyur Dechen Lingpa (1829-1870) was a tertön or "treasure revealer" and contemporary of Jamyang Khyentse Wangpo and Jamgon Kongtrul. Regarded as one of the major tertöns in Tibetan history, his termas are widely practiced by both the Kagyu and Nyingma schools.

Chokgyur Lingpa was the "manifestation," meaning the reincarnation, of King Trisong Deutsen's son, Prince Damdzin. Another of his former lives was the great terton, Sangye Lingpa, who revealed the Lama Gongdu. Chokgyur Lingpa was the last of the 100 major tertons. He was the owner of seven transmissions and is regarded as the universal monarch of all tertons. One of the reasons for this is that no other terton has revealed a teaching that includes the Space Section (Longdé) of Dzogchen. There are several Mind Section (Semde) revelations and all major tertons have revealed the Instruction Section (Mengagde), but only Chokgyur Lingpa transmitted the Space Section. This is why the Dzogchen Desum is considered the most extraordinary terma that he ever revealed. Chokgyur Lingpa's main consort was Dechen Chodron (Lady Degah) and Padmasambhava predicted that his three children would be emanations of the three family lords: Avalokiteshvara, Manjushri and Vajrapani. I don't like saying this, for it may sound like I'm bragging about my family line, but such a prophecy does exist. The Manjushri emanation was supposed to be Wangchok Dorje, the Avalokiteshvara emanation Tsewang Norbu and the Vajrapani emanation my grandmother, Konchok Paldron.

Chokgyur Lingpa founded Neten Monastery in Nangchen in 1858. It is the seat of the Neten Chokling reincarnation line.

Neten Chokling Rinpoche and Tsikey Chokling Rinpoche are the fourth reincarnations of Chokgyur Lingpa. This lineage traces back to Trisong Detsen, the Tibetan king who invited Padmasambhava to Tibet.

== See also ==
- Lamrim Yeshe Nyingpo
