= Chökyi Nyima Rinpoche =

Tibetan Buddhist teacher and meditation master

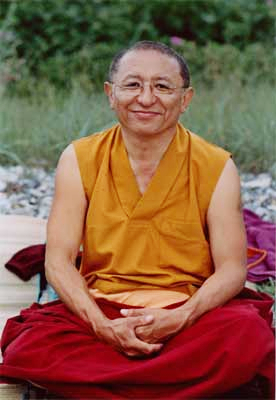
- Title: Rinpoche

Personal life
- Born: 1951 (age 74–75) Nakchukha; Central Tibet
- Occupation: Abbot, teacher, author

Religious life
- Religion: Vajrayana (Drikung Kagyu)

Senior posting
- Teacher: Dilgo Khyentse Rinpoche; Dudjom Rinpoche; Khunu Lama Tenzin Gyaltsen; Kyabje Tulku Urgyen Rinpoche

Chökyi Nyima Rinpoche (Tibetan: ཆོས་ཀྱི་ཉི་མ་རིན་པོ་ཆེ་, Wyl. chos kyi nyi ma rin po che or Nepali: छोकी निमा रिम्पोचे) (b. 1951) is a Tibetan Buddhist teacher and meditation master. He is the abbot of Ka-Nying Shedrub Ling Monastery in Kathmandu, Nepal. He is the author of several books, founder of meditation centers around the world, and an international teacher.

== Life ==
Born in 1951 in Nakchukha, Chökyi Nyima Rinpoche is the eldest son of Kunsang Dechen, a devoted Buddhist practitioner, and Tulku Urgyen Rinpoche, who was considered one of the greatest Dzogchen masters of his time. When he was 18 months old, Chökyi Nyima was recognized as the seventh incarnation Tibetan meditation master Gar Drubchen from Drikung Kagyu lineage. Not long after being recognized as tulku, he was enthroned at Drong Gon Tubten Dargye Ling, in Nakchukha, north of the capital city Lhasa.

Chökyi Nyima and his family fled Tibet due to the Chinese invasion. He and his younger brother, Tsikey Chokling Rinpoche, soon enrolled at the Young Lamas Home School in Dalhousie, India. At age thirteen, he entered Rumtek Monastery and spent 11 years studying under the care of the 16th Gyalwang Karmapa. In his youth he studied the Karma Kagyu, Drikung Kagyu, and Nyingma traditions. He also studied under Dilgo Khyentse Rinpoche, Dudjom Rinpoche, Khunu Lama Tenzin Gyaltsen, and his father, Kyabje Tulku Urgyen Rinpoche.

Chökyi Nyima Rinpoche left Rumtek in 1974. Upon completion of the monastery in 1976, the Karmapa enthroned Chokyi Nyima Rinpoche as the abbott of Ka-Nying Shedrub Ling Monastery in Kathmandu, Nepal. To this day the monastery is the center of Chökyi Nyima Rinpoche's activities and his main place of residence.

== Projects and centers ==
Chokyi Nyima Rinpoche is the founder and spiritual head of numerous centers for Buddhist study and meditation in Asia, Europe, and North America.

=== In Nepal ===
Ka-Nying Shedrub Ling Monastery at Boudhanath - a study and practice center for Tibetan Buddhism.

== Bibliography ==
- Chökyi Nyima Rinpoche (1996). The Indisputable Truth. Translated by Erik Pema Kunsang. Rangjung Yeshe Publications. ISBN 962-7341-27-4.
- Chökyi Nyima Rinpoche (2004). The Bardo Guidebook. Erik Pema Kunsang (trans.). Rangjung Yeshe Publications. ISBN 962-7341-11-8.
- Chökyi Nyima Rinpoche (2004). Present Fresh Wakefulness: A Meditation Manual on Nonconceptual Wisdom. Rangjung Yeshe Publications. ISBN 962-7341-47-9.
- Chökyi Nyima Rinpoche (2004). Union of Mahamudra and Dzogchen: A Commentary on The Quintessence of Spiritual Practice, The Direct Instructions of the Great Compassionate One. Erik Pema Kunsang (trans.). Rangjung Yeshe Publications. ISBN 962-7341-21-5.
- Chökyi Nyima Rinpoche; David R. Shlim M.D. (2006). Medicine and Compassion: A Tibetan Lama's Guidance for Caregivers. Wisdom Publications. ISBN 0-86171-512-8.
- Chökyi Nyima Rinpoche; Tsikey Rinpoche Chokling; Dudjom Rinpoche; Tulku Urgyen Rinpoche (2008). The Great Gate: A Guidebook to the Guru's Heart Practice, Dispeller of All Obstacles. Rangjung Yeshe Publications. ISBN 978-962-7341-04-8.
- Chokyi Nyima Rinpoche (2018). Sadness, Love, Openness: The Buddhist Path of Joy. Shambhala Publications. ISBN 9781611804881.
