= Rinpoche =

Honorific term used in the Tibetan language

Rinpoche, also spelled Rimpoche (Tibetan: རིན་པོ་ཆེ་, Wylie: rin po che, THL: Rinpoché, ZYPY: Rinboqê), is an honorific term used in the Tibetan language. It literally means "precious one", and may refer to a person, place, or thing—like the words "gem" or "jewel" (Sanskrit: Ratna).

The word consists of rin (value), po (nominalizing suffix) and chen (big).

The word is used in the context of Tibetan Buddhism as a way of showing respect when addressing those recognized as reincarnated, older, respected, notable, learned and/or an accomplished Lamas or teachers of the Dharma. It is also used as an honorific for abbots of Buddhist monasteries.

== See also ==
- Rinpoches, a partial list of a few spiritual teachers of past and present commonly addressed as Rinpoche.
- Tulku, someone who is recognized as the rebirth of a previous practitioner of Tibetan Buddhism.
- Mount Kailash is often called in the Tibetan language Gang Rinpoche.
