= Garab Dorje =

Purported founder of Dzogchen tradition

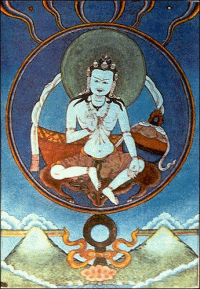
An illustration of Garab Dorje

Garab Dorje (c. 665) (Tibetan: དགའ་རབ་རྡོ་རྗེ་, Wylie: dga’ rab rdo rje) was a nomad and said to be the first human to receive the complete direct transmission teachings of Sutra, Tantra and Dzogchen. The circumstances of his birth are shrouded in different interpretations, with some accounts describing a miraculous birth by a virgin daughter of the king of Uddiyana. He has been described as "historically problematic" and at best a "mythical figure".

Garab Dorje became the first teacher of Dzogchen ("Great Perfection", also called Ati Yoga) teachings. Garab Dorje's core teachings revolve around understanding the nature of the mind as the original Buddha and Ultimate Reality, beyond birth and cessation, emphasizing meditation as a practice of allowing this natural state without seeking, letting it be as it is, this is the highest teaching in Buddhism.

According to the Nyingma school tradition of Tibetan Buddhism, he transmitted the profound empowerments of Dzogchen to his chief disciple, Manjushrimitra, and is also believed to have imparted these teachings to Padmasambhava.

His legacy includes the encapsulation of Dzogchen's essence in the "Three Words that Strike to the Heart of the Essential Point". This teaching is considered the pinnacle of Dzogchen wisdom, focusing on direct recognition of the nature of mind, single-pointed concentration, and confidence in liberating thoughts. Garab Dorje's writings, attributed to him, are essential texts in the Dzogchen tradition, further solidifying his influence and significance in Tibetan Buddhism's Nyingma school.

== Etymology ==
Garab Dorje (or Garap Dorje) is his only attested name. The Sanskrit offerings are reconstructions. No Sanskrit name has been found in a colophon. That said, John Myrdhin Reynolds cited Prahevajra or Pramodavajra in his book Self-Liberation Through Seeing with Naked Awareness [rig pa ngo sprod gcer mthong rang grol].

== Detail ==
According to the Nyingma school of Tibetan Buddhism, Garab Dorje transmitted the complete empowerments of Dzogchen to Manjushrimitra, who was regarded as his chief disciple. Padmasambhava is said to have received Garab Dorje's transmission of the Dzogchen tantras through an unbroken lineage via Mañjuśrīmitra, Śrī Simha, Jñānasūtra, and Vimalamitra.

Garab Dorje received the empowerment and transmission of the Mahayoga teachings of the Secret Matrix Tradition (Guhyagarbha tantra) from Mahasiddha Kukuraja.

== Birth ==
Garab Dorje's birth is interpreted in different ways by different people: In one interpretation, he was born as a son of Su-dharmā and an island-dwelling daughter of king Upa-rāja of Dhana-koṣa, in the land of Uddiyana, also the birthplace of Padmasambhava. In another interpretation, his mother is named as Pāraņī, located on the banks of lake Kutra.

The Nyingmapa lineage conveys Garab Dorje's birth to be a miraculous birth by a virgin daughter of the king of Odiyana (Uddiyana), and that he recited Dzogchen tantras at his birth. A detailed interpretation of the hagiographic nativity of Garab Dorje briefly contextualizes his mother, a bhikṣuṇī whose sadhana was Yoga tantra, and her parents. The bhiksuni daughter has a dream in which a man holds the vase of the Astamangala, the 'threefold world', with the syllables 'oṃ ā hūṃ' and svāhā:

The Lord of Secrets (gSang-ba'i-bdag-po) instructed the Holders of Wisdom (Rig-'dsin) in Dhanakośa in Uḍḍiyāna the contemporary Swat valley. There was a large temple, called bDe-byed-brtsegs-pa; it was surrounded by 1608 (Note: 1608 may or may not be a typographical error. Usually, such numbers are multiples of 9 such as 108.) smaller chapels. King Uparāja, and Queen sNang-ba-gsal-ba'i-od-ldan-ma resided there. They had a daughter called Sudharmā; she took the novice vows, and soon afterwards the full monastic vows. Sudharmā, together with her maidens, stayed on an island and meditated about the Yoga Tantra (rnal-'byor-gyi rgyud). One night the Bhikṣuṇī Sudharmā dreamed that a white man had come, who was utterly pure and beautiful. He held a crystal vessel in his hand which had the letters oṃ ā hūṃ svāhā engraved upon it. Three times he set the vessel upon the crown of her head, and light then shone from it. While this happened, she beheld the threefold world perfectly and clearly. Not long after this dream the Bhikṣuṇī gave birth to a true son of the gods.

== Teachings ==
In the tradition of the oral transmission lineage, Garab Dorje's teachings are also shared through quotations.

Before becoming Garab Dorje's student, Manjushrimitra heard of Garab Dorje's Dzogchen teachings, and sought a debate to defeat the heretical views. Manjushrimitra lost the debate and realized his errors. Garab Dorje then gave Manjushrimitra the complete Dzogchen empowerments, and summarized his teaching as follows:

The nature of mind is the original Buddha without birth or cessation, like the sky! When you understand that, all apparent phenomena are beyond birth and cessation. Meditating means letting this condition be as it is, without seeking.

As Garab Dorje attained paranirvana, his body dissolved into a mist of rainbow light. Manjushrimitra called to his teacher and Garab Dorje responded by handing his last teaching to Manjushrimitra, which was enclosed in a golden casket the size of a thumbnail. Inside, the three precepts known as the Three Words that Strike to the Heart of the Essential Point, or Tsig Sum Nèdek, (Wylie: tshig gSum gNad brDeg) contain the whole of the Dzogchen teachings, and are a universal introduction to Dzogchen. Garab Dorje became the wellspring for the body of instructions eventually known as the mind teachings of Tibet associated with Dzogchen of the Nyingma lineages.

Garab Dorje's "Three Words that Strike to the Heart" are considered the essential teaching by Dilgo Khyentse Rinpoche, and the infallible key point by Patrul Rinpoche. "The Three Statements that Strike the Vital Point" teaching, as translated by Lotsawa House:

Introducing directly the face of rigpa itself. (ngo rang tok tu tré)
Deciding upon one thing and one thing only. (tak chik tok tu ché)
Confidence directly in the liberation of rising thoughts. (deng drol tok tu cha)

== Writings ==
Though not his writings the tradition holds that the Seventeen Tantras were directly revealed to Garab Dorje. The following texts are attributed to Garab Dorje:

- "Cutting Through the Three Times" (Tibetan: དུས་གསུམ་ཆིག་ཆོད, Wylie: dus gsum chig chod)
- "Overwhelming the Six Modes of Consciousness with Splendour" (Tibetan: ཚོགས་དྲུག་ཟིལ་གནོན, Wylie: tshogs drug zil gnon)
- "Natural Freedom That Underlies Characteristics" (Tibetan: མཚན་མ་རང་གྲོལ, Wylie: mtshan ma rang grol)
- "Direct Encounter with the Three Kayas" (Tibetan: སྐུ་གསུམ་ཐུག་ཕྲད, Wylie: sku gsum thug phrad)
- "Vajra Fortress" (Tibetan: རྡོ་རྗེ་མཁར་རྫོང, Wylie: rdo rje mkhar rdzong)
- "Deep Immersion in Awareness" (Tibetan: རིག་པ་སྤྱི་བླུགས, Wylie: rig pa spyi blugs)

== See also ==
- Atiyoga – Tradition of teachings in Indo-Tibetan Buddhism
- Vimalamitra – 8th-century Indian Buddhist monk
