= Nyingma Gyubum =

Collection of Vajrayana texts

Nyingma Gyubum (Tibetan: རྙིང་མ་རྒྱུད་འབུམ, Wylie: rnying ma rgyud ‘bum, Collected Teachings of the Ancients) is a collection of Vajrayana texts reflecting the teachings of the Nyingma ("Ancient") school of Tibetan Buddhism.

The contents of this collection comprises the Inner Tantras common to the Nyingma: the Mahayoga, Anuyoga, and Atiyoga (Dzogchen) tantras. An important facet of Bhutanese culture, studying the Nyingma Gyubum is considered honorable.

== Canonization ==
Nyingma Gyubum texts are generally excluded from the Kangyur and Tengyur sections of the Tibetan canon by the Sarma (New Translation) traditions (Sakya, Kagyu, Gelug). It is theorized that the formation of the first edition of the Nyingma Gyubum began in the twelfth century, with certain texts drawn from the Terma literature.

There are only seven extant texts of the Space Class of Dzogchen, each of which is contained in the Nyingma Gyubum.

== Extant versions ==
Cantwell and Mayer have, since 1996, published four monographs on the rNying ma'i rGyud 'bum, and have critically edited a number of its texts. Their work has established that the nine easily available extant versions fall into three distinct lines of descent. Thus, the four Bhutanese versions of Tshamdrag, Gangteng-A and -B, and Drametse form one line of descent, all from a Lhalung original. The Rigzin, Tingkye, Kathmandu and Nubri versions all hail from a common ancestor in South Central Tibet, but Kathmandu and Nubri are of a slightly different sub-branch to the Tingkye and Rigzin. Dege is unique in itself.

Harunaga & Almogi (July 2009) hold that there are, at minimum, seven extant versions of the Nyingma Gyubum of different sizes, ranging from 26 to 46 volumes in length.

=== Degé (Wylie: sde dge) Edition ===
The terton Ratna Lingpa (1403–1471) was important in the compilation of the Nyingma Gyubum's first evocation and Jigmed Lingpa (1729–1798) built upon this compilation and it was published with the impetus of Getse Mahapandita (1761–1829), one of Jigme Lingpa's disciples, through patronage of the royal house of Degé. Further to this, Rigpa Shedra (2009) hold that the Nyingma Gyubum:

"...was first compiled by the great tertön Ratna Lingpa after similar compilations of texts made in the 14th century, such as the Kangyur and the Tengyur, had omitted many of the Nyingma tantras. It was first published towards the end of the 18th century under the guidance of the Omniscient Jigmed Lingpa, in Derge, thanks to the patronage of the regent queen Tsewang Lhamo."

Jigme Lingpa gathered Nyingma texts that had become rare, starting with Nyingma tantras held in the manuscript collection of the Mindrolling Monastery. This collection of the Nyingma tantras led to the amassing of the 'Collection of Nyingma Tantras', the Nyingma Gyübum (Wylie: rNying-ma rgyud-'bum) for which Getse Mahapandita wrote the catalogue, proofread and arranged for its printing by soliciting the expensive and labour-intensive project of carving the wood blocks for the block printing. The wood block carving was forded through the patronage of the 'Degé' (Wylie: sDe-dge) Royal Family of Kham who favoured and honoured Jigme Lingpa. Getse Mahapandita proof read the Nyingma Gyübum.

- Catalogue of the Nyingma Gyubum, Degé Edition: Table of Contents by Major Genres and Volumes @ THL Tibetan Literary Encyclopedia

=== Collected Tantras of Vairochana (Wylie: bai ro’i rgyud ’bum) ===
The 'Collected Tantras of Vairochana' (Tibetan: བཻ་རོའི་རྒྱུད་འབུམ, Wylie: bai ro’i rgyud ’bum) is collection of ancient tantras and esoteric instructions compiled and translated by the eighth century Tibetan master Vairochana.

- Catalogue of the Collected Tantras of Vairochana @ THL Tibetan Literary Encyclopedia

=== Tingkyé (Wylie: gting skyes) Edition ===
- In late last century, Dil mgo mkhyen brtse rin po che (顶果钦哲仁波切) (1910–1991) discover more manuscripts in Bhutan, 46 boxes in Mtshams brag monastery (禅扎寺) and 36 boxes in Gting skyes monastery (定切寺). This version is more complete. The texts were published by The National Library of Bhutan (不丹皇家政府国家图书馆) in 1982.

An admirable pioneering catalogue of this collection, including all titles, chapters and colophons, was made by Kaneko in Japan. Some years later, this was usefully rendered into a digital version by THDL.

=== Tsamdrak (Wylie: mtshams brag) Edition ===
- Catalog of The Collected Tantras of the Ancients, Tsamdrak Edition @ THL Tibetan Literary Encyclopedia

Anthony Hanson-Barber provided the first title and colophons catalog of this collection. His work was then expanded into a fuller catalog including chapter headings by the THDL team.

Importantly, the Kunjed Gyalpo is the first text in the Tsamdrak edition of the Nyingma Gyubum.

=== Catalog of the Master Edition ===
Though not a true extant edition, the THL Tibetan Literary Encyclopedia under the directive of Germano has distilled a Master Edition taking the above mentioned editions into account.

- Catalog of the Master Edition of the Nyingma Gyubum @ THL Tibetan Literary Encyclopedia

=== Rig 'dzin Tshe dbang nor bu Edition ===
Cantwell, Mayer and Fischer (2002) in association with their partnerships document the Rig 'dzin Tshe dbang nor bu Edition of the Nyingma Gyubum.

- The Catalogue of the Rig 'dzin Tshe dbang nor bu rNying ma'i rgyud 'bum
- The Rig 'dzin Tshe dbang nor bu Edition of the rNying ma'i rgyud 'bum: An Illustrated Inventory

=== 'Gangteng' (Wylie: sgang steng) Edition ===
Cantwell, Mayer, Kowalewski & Achard (2006) have published a catalogue in English of this edition of the Nyingma Gyubum.

== Indigenous Himalayan discourse rendered in English: an emic narrative ==
=== What constitutes a tantra according to the Nyingma? ===
Early in the naturalization and acclimatization of Indian and Chinese tantric Buddhadharma and siddha traditions into the Himalaya and Greater Tibet in general, the Guhyagarbha Tantra (Wylie: gsang ba snying po) of the Mahayoga class of literature "represents the most normative vision of what constitutes a tantra for these Nyingma lineages". Indigenous Tibetan exegetical works discuss what constitutes a 'tantra' in an enumeration of ten or eleven "practical principles of tantra" (Wylie: rgyud kyi dngos po) understood as defining the distinctive features of mainstream tantric systems as understood and envisioned at that point in time:

1. 'A view of the real' (Wylie: de kho na nyid lta ba)
2. 'Determinate conduct' (Wylie: la dor ba spyod pa)
3. 'Mandala array' (Wylie: bkod pa dkyil 'khor)
4. 'Successive gradation of empowerment' (Wylie: rim par bgrod pa dbang)
5. 'Commitment which is not transgressed' (Wylie: mi 'da' ba dam tshig)
6. 'Enlightened activity which is displayed' (Wylie: rol pa phrin las)
7. 'Fulfillment of aspiration' (Wylie: don du gnyer ba sgrub pa)
8. 'Offerings which bring the goal to fruition' (Wylie: gnas su stobs pa mchod pa)
9. 'Unwavering contemplation' (Wylie: mi g.yo ba ting nge 'dzin), and
10. 'Mantra recitation' (Wylie: zlos pa sngags) accompanied by 'the seal which binds the practitioner to realization' (Wylie: 'ching ba phyag rgya).

These are the ten aspects of the tantric path, and also the ten primary topics to be explained.

== Modern 'Western' discourse in English: an etic narrative ==
=== Timeline of salient scholarship ===
Germano (1992) discussed the Atiyoga tantras in his thesis. Ehrhard (1995) documents the discovery of manuscripts of the Nyingma Gyubum from Nepal. In 1996 at the University of Leiden, Mayer completed the first PhD that was specifically on the rNying ma'i rGyud 'bum and its different editions. In his thesis he established for the first time the various branches of transmission of the rNying ma'i rGyud 'bum by stemmatic analysis. These three branches he identified as the East Tibetan, the Bhutanese, and the South Central Tibetan (which subdivides into two sub-branches). This remains the standard method to categorise the various rNying ma'i rGyud 'bum editions, since all editions subsequently discovered have been found to fall within one or another of these lines of transmission. Mayer's PhD also identified the first irrefutable proof of the sources of Mahāyoga texts, and reviewed what was then known of the rNying ma'i rGyud 'bum's history. Germano's earlier work was further appended with Germano (2000) specifically related to the Nyingma Gyubum. Cantwell, Mayer and Fischer (2002) in association with the British Library documented the Rig 'dzin Tshe dbang nor bu Edition of the Nyingma Gyubum. Cantwell and Mayer subsequently published their third monograph on the rNying ma'i rGyud 'bum, discussing its history and its various editions and providing critical editions of two sample texts: "The Kīlaya Nirvāṇa Tantra and the Vajra Wrath Tantra: Two Texts from the Ancient Tantra Collection". Vienna, 2006. Derbac (2007) tendered an MA thesis on the Nyingma Gyubum as a whole. In 2008, Mayer and Cantwell published their fourth monograph relating to the rNying ma'i rGyud 'bum, in which they showed that virtually all Dunhuang text on Phur pa subsequently reappeared within various parts of the rNying ma'i rGyud 'bum, thus proving that the rNying ma tantric materials are definitely contemporaneous with or older than the Dunhuang texts. As of 2010, they are still at Oxford University and completing their fifth volume on the rNying ma'i rGyud 'bum. As well as the monographs, they have also produced catalogues and many journal articles and conference papers on the rNying ma'i rGyud 'bum.

=== Etic discourse and narrative ===
In his MA thesis for the University of Alberta, in the terrain of scholarly etic discourse of the manifold Nyingma Gyubum editions, Derbac (2007: p. 2) proffers:

"...that the major editors of the various rNying ma'i rgyud 'bum editions played a far greater role in emending colophons, catalogues, and editions than scholars have previously assumed."

In saying this, Derbac is agreeing on the one hand with emic [traditional] scholarship, which frankly celebrates the major role of the famous editors such as Ratna Lingpa and Jigme Lingpa in compiling catalogues for the rNying ma'i rgyud 'bum. In addition, he is also confirming the conclusions of earlier scholarship, such as [1] Mayer's Leiden PhD thesis of 1996, which was later published as a book 'The Phur pa bcu gnyis: A Scripture from the Ancient Tantra Collection' [2] the conclusions of David Germano's THDL collection in the early 2000s, and [3] Cantwell and Mayer's book 'The Kīlaya Nirvāṇa Tantra and the Vajra Wrath Tantra: Two texts from the Ancient Tantra Collection', published in 2006 by the Österreichische Akademie der Wissenschaften, Vienna. Derbac cites all the above three sources, as well as others of the works by Mayer and Cantwell on the rNying ma'i rGyud 'bum.

== Primary resources ==
- History and Nature of The Collected Tantras of the Ancients - Dr. David Germano (University of Virginia), March 25, 2002.
- TBRC online version of the largest known edition of the Nyingma Gyubum. The manuscripts from which this collection were printed were found at the monastery of Tsamdrag in western Bhutan and comprises 46 volumes. This is a scanned version of the photo-offset edition published in 1982 by The National Library of Bhutan, Thimphu. The original is held to have been calligraphed in the 18th century.
- Catalogs of the Collected Tantras of the Ancients - Tibetan and Himalayan Library catalogs of different editions of the Nyingma Gyubum. Including: Master Catalog; Catalog of the Collected Tantras of Vairochana (bai ro’i rgyud ’bum); Degé (sde dge) Edition; Tingkyé (gting skyes) Edition; and Tsamdrak (mtshams brag) Edition.
