= Anuyoga =

Tibetan Buddhist tantra

Anuyoga (Devanagari: अनुयोग 'further yoga') is the designation of the second of the three Inner Tantras according to the ninefold division of practice used by the Nyingma school of Tibetan Buddhism. This schema categorizes various stages of practice, and Anuyoga specifically emphasizes the completion stage of Tantra. As with the other yanas, Anuyoga represents both a scriptural division as well as a specific emphasis of both view and practice. Anuyoga delves into inner practices involving the subtle body, chakras, prana (subtle energies), nadis (energy pathways), and consciousness (bindu). It is particularly suited for individuals whose primary obstacle is passion and is associated with the feminine principle.

The central view of Anuyoga revolves around realizing the essence of the 'Threefold Maṇḍala of Samantabhadra,' comprising 'empty basic space', 'wisdom', and the 'union of emptiness and wisdom'. The Anuyoga category can be further divided into four root sutras, six tantras clarifying the six limits, twelve rare tantras, and the Seventy Literary Scriptures, making it a rich and diverse tradition within Tibetan Buddhism that focuses on inner transformation and enlightenment through completion stage practices.

== Position in the nine-yana schema ==
Anuyoga is said to emphasise the completion stage of Tantra, where the preceding division, Mahayoga emphasises the generation stage. Dalton (2003: unpaginated) in introducing the literature of the Anuyoga-yana affirms the affiliation of the Anuyoga-yana with the 'completion stage' also known as the 'perfection stage':

Modern-day doxographical presentations of the Nyingma school are usually based on the system of the nine vehicles (theg pa dgu). Emphasis is placed on the highest three vehicles in this scheme, namely Mahāyoga, Anuyoga, and Atiyoga. Generally speaking, these three “inner” yogas correspond to three stages in tantric practice, namely the generation stage, during which the details of the visualizations are stabilised, the perfection stage, in which those visualizations are then employed towards familiarizing oneself with the state of enlightenment, and finally the Great Perfection, the spontaneous accomplishment of buddhahood. Being the second of the three inner yogas, Anuyoga is thus associated with the practices of the perfection stage.

Ray (2002: p. 124-125) mentions visualization, subtle body, chakra, prana, nadis, bindu and pure land:

Anuyoga-yana is associated with the feminine principle and is for those whose principal obstacle is passion. In anuyoga the emphasis shifts away from external visualization toward the completion stage, in which one meditates on the inner or subtle body with its primary energy centres (chakras), and its prana (winds or subtle energies), nadis (the inner pathways along which one's energy travels), and bindu (the consciousness). In anuyoga, all appearances are seen as the three great mandalas, and reality is understood as the deities and their pure lands.

Germano (2002: unpaginated) frames the importance of Nub Sangye Yeshe as the instigator of Anuyoga within Tibet and states that it was: "the late ninth century Nub Sangye Yeshe (gnubs sangs rgyas ye shes), who inaugurated the Anuyoga tradition in Tibet...".

Dudjom (1904–1987), et al. (1991: p. 460 History) relate an important source that impacts on the story of King Ja (particularly the narrative of the Buddhadharma relics falling from the sky upon the royal palace) a happenstance which is implied to be concurrent with the emergence of the texts of Anuyoga in Sri Lanka with the provision of a quote of what Dudjom et al. identify as a "prediction" found in the fifth chapter of the 'Tantra which Comprises the Supreme Path of the Means which Clearly Reveal All-Positive Pristine Cognition' (Wylie: kun bzang ye shes gsal bar ston pa'i thabs kyi lam mchog 'dus pa'i rgyud, Nyingma Gyubum Vol.3) which Dudjom, et al., render in English thus:

The Mahayoga tantras will fall onto the palace of King Ja. The Anuyoga tantras will emerge in the forests of Singhala [Dudjom et al. identify Singhala as located in Ceylon].

== View ==
The particular view of Anuyoga is to realise the essence of the 'Threefold Maṇḍala of Samantabhadra' (Wylie: kun tu bzang po dkyil 'khor gsum):

1. "empty basic space" (Wylie: skyes med pa'i dbyings): the 'Primordial Maṇḍala of Samantabhadrī' (Wylie: ye ji bzhin pa'i dkyil 'khor)
2. "wisdom" (Wylie: Ye shes): the 'Natural Maṇḍala of Spontaneous Presence'(Wylie: rang bzhin lhun grub kyi dkyil 'khor)
3. "union of emptiness and wisdom" (Wylie: chos kyi dbyings kyi ye shes): the 'fundamental Maṇḍala of Enlightenment' (Wylie: byang chub sems kyi dkyil 'khor)

Stated differently:

The three mandalas of: Kuntuzangmo, the unborn dharmadhatu (dByings skye med kun tu bzang mo’i dkyil ’khor); whose unobstructed skillful means of luminosity is the mandala of Kuntuzangpo, the yeshe wisdom (Ye.shes kun tu.bzang po’i dkyil ’khor); and their inseparable union is the mandala of Great Bliss their son (Sras bde ba chen po’i dkyil ‘khor).

== Texts ==
Anuyoga is the middle category of the inner tantras for the Nyingma school. This doxographical category, often called 'mdo' (Wylie; Sanskrit: sūtra; English: 'thread', 'continuity'), is not to be confused with the non-tantric category by the same name. It contains several works that designate themselves as sūtras, as well as the important text "Compendium of the Buddhas' Intentionality" (Wylie: sangs rgyas dgongs 'dus) or Compendium of the Intentions (Wylie: dgongs pa ’dus pa’i mdo, Skt: sarvavidyā sūtra). This text may or may not have ever existed in India; according to the colpohon it was translated from the language of Gilgit (bru sha), whence all of the Anuyoga texts are said to have been brought to Tibet.

Altogether, there are three volumes of Anuyoga tantras amounting to nearly three thousand pages of Tibetan text. Although the mTshams brag edition of The Collected Tantras does not rigorously organise its texts according to sub-categories, the Anuyoga category may be further subdivided according to the following scheme from Dudjom Rinpoche (Dudjom, et al. 1991: p. 289) which varies from the earlier catalogues canonised by Jigme Lingpa and that of Dampa Deshegs:

1. The four root sutras (Wylie: rtsa ba'i rgyud bzhi)
2. The six tantras clarifying the six limits (Wylie: mtha’ drug gsal bar byed pa’i rgyud drug)
3. The twelve rare tantras (Wylie: dkon rgyud bcu gnyis)
4. The Seventy Literary Scriptures (Wylie: lung gi yi ge bdun cu)

=== The four root sutras (Wylie: rtsa ba’i mdo bzhi) ===
- Gathering of the Hidden Meaning (Wylie: dgongs pa ’dus pa’i mdo) Skt: sarva tathāgata citta jñāna guhyārtha garbha vyūha vajra tantra / siddha yogāgama samāja sarvavidyā sūtra mahāyānābhisamaya dharmā paryāya vivyūha nāma sūtram
- Gathering of All Knowledge (Wylie: kun ’dus rig pa’i mdo) Skt: sarva tathāgata citta guhya jñānārtha garbha krodha vajra kula tantra piṇḍārtha vidyā yoga siddha nāma mahāyāna sūtra
- Play of the Charnel Ground Cuckoo (Wylie: dur khrod khu byug rol ba) Skt: sarva tathāgatasya kāya vāk citta guhya śmaśāna lalita tantra nāma mahāyāna sūtra
- Wheel of Lightning of Miraculous Wisdom (Wylie: ye shes rngam pa klog gi ‘khor lo) Skt: sarva tathāgata guhya mahāgupta kośa akṣaya nidhi dīpa mahāvrata sādhana tantra jñānāścarya dyuti cakra nāma mahāyānasūtra

=== The six tantras clarifying the six limits (Wylie: mtha’ drug gsal bar byed pa’i rgyud drug) ===
- kun tu bzang po che ba rang la gnas pa’i rgyud (Skt: sarva dr̥ṣṭi rāja samantabhadrādhimātra svasti tantra)
- dbang bskur rgyal po (Skt: padma rāja abhiṣiñca rāja ati tantra)
- ting ’dzin mchog (Skt: samādhyagra tantra rāja)
- skabs sbyor bdun pa (Skt: saca karma sarva rāja tantra)
- brtson pa don bden
- dam tshig bkod pa

=== The twelve rare tantras (Wylie: dkon rgyud bcu gnyis) ===
- zhi ba lha rgyud (Skt: śānti deva tantra mahā)
- chos nyid zhi ba’i lha rgyud (Skt: dharmatā śānti deva tantra)
- khro bo’i lha rgyud chen mo (Skt: krodha deva tantra mahā)
- khro bo’i lha rgyud rtogs pa chen po (Skt: krodha deva tantra mahā kalpa)
- thugs rje chen po’i gtor rgyud (terminating colophon of the Catalogue of the Rig 'dzin Tshe dbang nor bu rNying ma'i rgyud 'bum (Skt: mahā karuṇā baliṃ māṃsa raktāsthi mahā bali tantra)
- rnal ’byor gsang ba’i tshogs rgyud chen po (Skt: yoga gaṇa mahā tantra)
- dpal ’bar khro mo (Skt: śrī jvala krodhī tantra)
- rak ta dmar gyi rgyud (Skt: sarva tathāgata rakta mūla tantra)
- me lha zhi bar gyur ba ’bar ba’i rgyud (Skt: ratna agni śāntiṃkuru jvala tantra)
- khro bo’i sbyin bsregs rdo rje’i dur mo
- hum mdzad chen mo (Skt: mahā hūṃ kāra tantra)
- zla gsang chen mo

=== The Seventy Literary Scriptures (Wylie: lung gi yi ge bdun cu) ===
This list remains to be enumerated.

=== Mindstream ===
The 'mind-stream doctrine' (Sanskrit: citta santana; Wylie: thugs rgyud; sems rgyud) is a union of the Semde (Wylie: sems sde, 'mind series') category of Atiyoga and Anuyoga proper and is reinforced by the Guhyagarbha Tantra literature and the Kulayarāja Tantra which comprised a major part of the transmitted precepts of the 'Zur Lineage' (Wylie: zur lugs):

This family was responsible for first formulating the transmitted precepts as such. In doing so, they made the Compendium Sūtra a major part of their system, placing it alongside the Guhyagarbha Tantra and the kun byed rgyal po to make their famous “sūtra-tantra-mind triad” (mdo rgyud sems gsum). These three works became the chief canonical texts of the Zur’s transmitted precepts, corresponding to the respective doxographical classes of Anuyoga, Mahāyoga, and the mind series of Atiyoga (sems sde).

== See also ==
- Katok Monastery
