= Kukuraja =

Kukuraja was a mahasiddha within the lineages of Esoteric Buddhism and he was contemporaneous with Indrabhuti of Sahor (also known as King Ja) and Kambalapada (also known as Lawapa).

Kukuraja interpreted Tantras for King Indrabhuti. Indrabhuti is held in some sources to be the father of Padmasambhava.

== Instruction ==
According to Nyingma tradition, King Ja taught himself intuitively from "the Book" of the Tantric Way of Secret Mantra (that is Mantrayana) that magically fell from the sky along with other sacred objects and relics "upon the roof of King Ja" according to Dudjom (1904–1987), et al. (1991: p. 613 History) took place on the Tibetan calendar year of the Earth Monkey, which Dudjom et al. identify as 853 BC[E]. Kukuraja received instruction drawn from "the Book" on what may be understood as the Outer Tantras from King Ja, then King Ja received instruction on what may be understood as the Inner Tantras from Kukuraja (Kukkuraja taught King Ja after Kukkuraja received a direct revelation of Vajrasattva wherein Vajrasattva prophesied the imminent esoteric transmission of Vajrapani, the Lord of Secrets, to Kukuraja which was only made possible through the quickening of Kukuraja by King Ja with his intuitive knowledge drawn from "the Book") as Dudjom (1904–1987), et al. (1991: p. 460) of the principally Nyingma view relates:

Then King Ja taught the book to master Uparaja, who was renowned as a great scholar throughout the land of Sahor, but he could not understand their symbolic conventions and meaning. The king then taught them to the master Kukkuraja. He intuitively understood the chapter on the "Vision of Vajrasattva", from the Tantra of the Magical Net of Vajrasattva [Wylie: rdo rje sems dpa' sgyu 'phrul drva ba (also known as the Guhyagarbha Tantra)], and practiced it, whereupon Vajrasattva revealed himself and predicted that the Lord of Secrets would reveal the meanings of this tantra thereafter. When he had practised more, the Lord of Secrets actually appeared and granted him [Kukkuraja] the complete empowerment of the authentic teaching and of all vehicles. Then he told him to request the verbal teaching from the Licchavi Vimalakirti. It is said that, following the transmitted precepts of the Lord of Secrets, master Kukkuraja divided [the Mahayoga tantras] into the Eighteen Great Tantrapitaka (tantra chen-po sde bco-brgyad) and taught them to King Ja.
