= Mahāmāyā Tantra =

The Mahāmāyā Tantra, (Note: Toh 425, Degé Kangyur vol. 80 (rgyud ’bum, nga), folios 167a–171a) (Sanskrit: श्रीमहामायातन्त्रराजनाम, Śrīmahāmāyātantrarājanāma) (Tibetan: sgyu 'phrul chen po'i rgyud) is a Buddhist Anuttarayoga tantra or Yoganiruttaratantra particularly associated with the practice of Dream Yoga.

The Mahāmāyā Tantra is a short text, having only three chapters and it deals with subjects such as Siddhis, the classification of Hetu, Phala and Upayatantras, and manifestations of the deity Mahāmāyā.

This text should not be confused with the Mayajala-tantra.

== History ==
=== Origins ===
The Mahāmāyā Tantra probably first appeared within Buddhist tantric communities during the late ninth or early tenth centuries CE. Based on instances of intertextuality (Note: Verses 3.12–14 of the Mahāmāyātantra contain a number of close correspondences with verses 12.52, 53, and 55 of the Guhyasamājatantra.) it is considered to postdate the Guhyasamāja Tantra; and because it is less doctrinally and structurally developed than tantras such as the Hevajra Tantra, its origins are likely to precede that text, and it is usually considered to be amongst the earliest of the Yoginī tantras.

By the eleventh century CE the Mahāmāyā Tantra was circulating within monastic institutions as well as communities surrounding tantric adepts or mahāsiddhas.

=== Lineage ===
xx

=== Translations ===
The Mahāmāyā Tantra was originally translated from Sanskrit into Tibetan by the Indian paṇḍita Jinavara and the great Tibetan translator Gö Lhetsé ('gos lhas-btsas) (11th C CE).

Recently the Sanskrit text of this tantra has been reconstructed, with the help of the Tibetan text and the extant Sanskrit commentaries, by Samdhong Rinpoche and published by the Central University of Tibetan Studies. It has been translated into Hindi by Dr. Kashinath Nyaupane and an English translation has been made by the Dharmachakra Translation Committee, under the patronage and supervision of the 84000: Translating the Words of the Buddha project.

== Content ==
Om Hrim Mahamaye Sarvashakti Hridayankari Devi Shri Parashakti Namostute

Translation: "Om, I bow to the great goddess Mahamaya, who is the source of all power and resides in the heart. I offer my respects to the supreme divine mother Parashakti."

== Deity ==
Although Mahāmāyā is a feminine deity, in her mandala and sadhana or meditation practice, she takes the form of a male heruka deity embracing a consort.

The principal form of this meditational deity Mahāmāyā has a blue complexion and stands in dancing (ardhaprayanka) posture with his (proper) right leg extended and left leg bent up. The deity has four faces (c. blue, yellow, red and green) and four arms; the first pair of arms hold a skull cup and a khatvanga staff and embrace the consort Buddhadakini (sangs rgyas mkha' 'gro ma) who is also blue in color and has her right leg wrapped around him. His second pair of arms hold an arrow and a bow. He wears a shawl of human skin and the ornaments of a heruka.

In the Shangpa Kagyu tradition of Tibetan Buddhism Mahāmāyā is one of the deities of the practice known as "The Deities of the Five Tantra Classes" (tib : rgyud sde lha lnga) which is the main yidam practice of this school. This practice brings the deities of the Guhyasamāja, Mahamaya, Hevajra, Cakrasamvara and Vajrabhairava tantras into a single mandala, imagined at different chakras within the body of Cakrasamvara. In this practice Mahamaya is usually visualized in a two armed heruka form, standing in a dancing posture, dark blue in color, holding an arrow and bow, and embracing a red consort.

== Hindu Traditions ==
In Śaivism Mahāmāyā (महामाया) is the name of one of the twenty four goddesses of the Sūryamaṇḍala according to the Kubjikamata Tantra. She presides over the pitha of Ujjain.

In Śāktism Mahāmāya is one of the names of Mahāsakti or one of the sixty-four Matrikas or Yogini to be worshiped during Āvaraṇapūjā.
