= Śrāvakayāna =

Buddhist term referring to a vehicle to enlightenment available to disciples of a Buddha

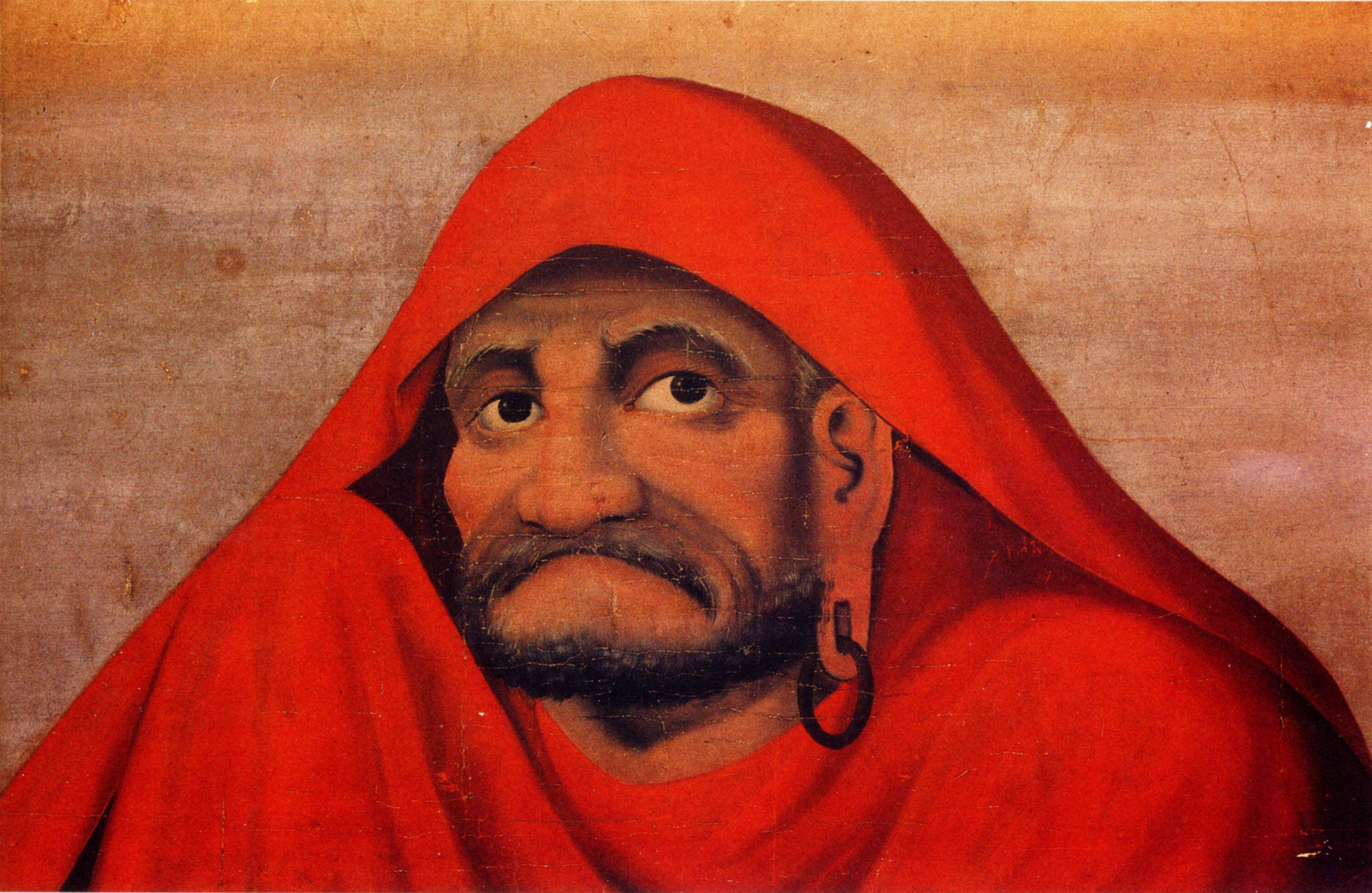
Hanging scroll of an Indian Buddhist arhat by Japanese painter Shiba Kōkan

Śrāvakayāna (Sanskrit: श्रावकयान; Pali: सावकयान; traditional Chinese: 聲聞乘; ; pinyin: Shēngwén Chéng; Vietnamese: Thanh văn giác) is one of the three yānas known to Indian Buddhism. It translates literally as the "vehicle of listeners [i.e. disciples]". Historically it was the most common term used by Mahāyāna Buddhist texts to describe one hypothetical path to enlightenment. Śrāvakayāna is the path that meets the goals of an Arhat—an individual who achieves liberation as a result of listening to the teachings (or following a lineage) of a Samyaksaṃbuddha. A Buddha who achieved enlightenment through Śrāvakayāna is called a Śrāvakabuddha, as distinguished from a Samyaksaṃbuddha or pratyekabuddha.

== Use of the term ==
Isabelle Onians asserts that although "the Mahāyāna ... very occasionally referred contemptuously to earlier Buddhism as the Hinayāna, the Inferior Way," "the preponderance of this name in the secondary literature is far out of proportion to occurrences in the Indian texts." She notes that the term Śrāvakayāna was "the more politically correct and much more usual" term used by Mahāyānists. "Hīnayāna" (the "lesser vehicle"), however, was used to include both Śrāvakayāna and Pratyekabuddhayāna in contrast to the Mahāyāna.

== In Early Buddhist schools ==
At least some of the early Buddhist schools used the concept of three vehicles including Śrāvakayāna. For example, the Vaibhāṣika Sarvāstivādins are known to have employed the outlook of Buddhist practice as consisting of the Three Vehicles:

1. Śrāvakayāna
2. Pratyekabuddhayāna
3. Bodhisattvayāna

The Dharmaguptakas regarded the path of a śrāvaka (śrāvakayāna) and the path of a bodhisattva (bodhisattvayāna) to be separate. One of their tenets reads, "The Buddha and those of the Two Vehicles, although they have one and the same liberation, have followed different noble paths."

== In Mahāyāna traditions ==
In the 4th century Mahāyāna abhidharma work Abhidharmasamuccaya, Asaṅga describes those who follow the Śrāvaka Vehicle (Skt. śrāvakayanika). These people are described as having weak faculties, following the Śrāvaka Dharma, utilizing the Śrāvaka Piṭaka, being set on their own liberation, and cultivating detachment in order to attain liberation. While those in the Pratyekabuddha Vehicle (Skt. pratyekabuddhayānika) are portrayed as also utilizing the Śrāvaka Piṭaka, they are said to have medium faculties, to follow the Pratyekabuddha Dharma, and to be set on their own personal enlightenment. Finally, those in the Mahāyāna (Skt. mahāyānika) are portrayed as utilizing the Bodhisattva Piṭaka, as having sharp faculties, following the Bodhisattva Dharma, and set on the perfection and liberation of all beings, and the attainment of complete enlightenment.

=== In Tibetan Buddhism ===
In the work written by Gampopa (1074-1153 C.E.), "The Jewel Ornament of Liberation, The Wish-fulfilling Gem of the Noble Teachings", the ‘Pratyekabuddha family’ are described as those who fear samsara and yearn to reach nirvana, but have little compassionate activity, benefiting other beings.

They cling to the idea that the unsullied meditative absorption they experience is Nirvana, when it's more like an island to find rest on the way to their actual goal. Rather than feel discouraged, the Buddha taught the Śravakabuddha and Pratyekabuddha paths for rest and recuperation. After finding rest, they are encouraged and awakened by the Buddha's body speech and mind to reach final Nirvana. Inspired by the Buddha, they then cultivate Bodhicitta and practice the Bodhisattva path.

== In Theravāda traditions ==
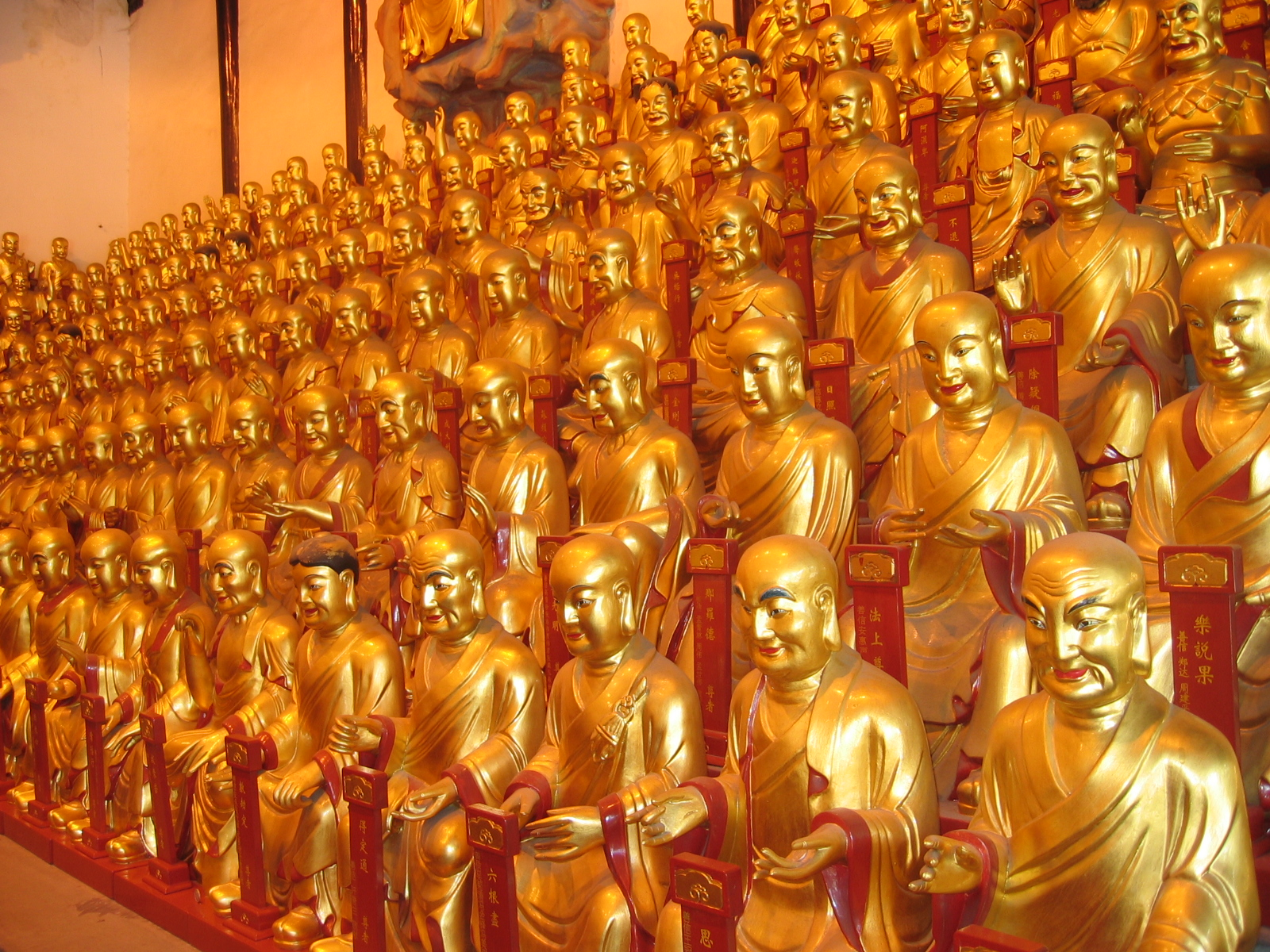
Statues of the 500 arhats in the Longhua temple in Shanghai, P.R. China

=== Sāvakabuddha ===
Sāvakabuddha is a Pali term (equivalent to Sanskrit: Śrāvakabuddha), used rarely in Theravada Buddhism, to refer to an enlightened disciple of a Buddha. Sāvaka means "one who hears"; a person who follows the path to enlightenment by means of hearing the instructions of others. Lay persons, who take special vows, are called sāvakas. Such enlightened disciples obtained nibbāṇa by hearing the dhamma as initially taught by a sammasambuddha. A Sāvakabuddha is distinguished from a Sammasambuddha and a Paccekabuddha. The standard designation for such a person is "arhat".

Buddhas are supposed to reach nibbāṇa by their own efforts and insights. A Sāvakabuddha might also lead others to enlightenment, but cannot teach the dhamma in a time or world where it has been forgotten, because they depend upon a tradition that stretches back to a Sammasambuddha.

The term Sāvakabuddha is used in Theravadin commentaries but does not occur in the scriptures of the Pāli Canon.

== See also ==
- Early Buddhist schools
