= Yana (Buddhism) =

Method of spiritual practice

Yāna (Sanskrit: यान and Pāli: "vehicle") refers to a mode or method of spiritual practice in Buddhism. It is claimed they were all taught by the Gautama Buddha in response to the various capacities of individuals. On an outwardly conventional level, the teachings and practices may appear contradictory, but ultimately they all have the same goal.

== Nomenclature, etymology and orthography ==
In form, yāna is a neuter noun derived from the Sanskrit root yā- meaning to "go to" or "move" or "reach". The suffix employed to form this noun may have different values: while primarily yāna is understood to refer to the means (kara.na) through which one goes to/ reaches a location, it may technically also refer to the action itself (bhāva). Yāna is therefore primarily a "vehicle", in most contexts relevant to the Buddhist doctrine of three yānas.

"Vehicle" is often used as a preferred translation as the word that provides the least in the way of presuppositions about the mode of travel.

In specifically Buddhist contexts, the word yāna acquires many metaphorical meanings, discussed below.

== Teaching story and metaphor ==
In the Mahāparinibbāna Sutta (1.33-34), Shakyamuni Buddha relates a story on vehicles of conveyance utilizing the sacred river Ganges, all of which may be engaged as a metaphor for yana and a gradual or direct path:

1.33 And then the Lord came to the River Ganges. And just then, the river was so full that a crow could drink out of it. And some people were looking for a boat, and some were looking for a raft, and some were binding together a raft of reeds to get to the other side. But the Lord, as swiftly as a strong man might stretch out his flexed arm or flex it again, vanished from this side of the Ganges and reappeared with his order of monks on the other shore.
1.34 And the Lord saw those people who were looking for a boat, looking for a raft, and binding together a raft of reeds to get to the other side. And seeing their intentions, he uttered this verse on the spot:

'When they want to cross the sea, the lake or pond,
People make a bridge or raft - the wise have crossed already.'

These two verses are meant to teach that all vehicles, teachings and doctrine are skillful means (Skt.upāya).

== Introduction and qualification of the term yana ==
The Bodhipathapradīpa of Atisha (980-1054 CE), quoted in Gampopa's (1079-1153 CE) Jewel Ornament of Liberation rendered into English by Günther, makes reference to people of three capacities:

Man is to be known in three ways:
As inferior, mediocre and excellent.

He who by any means whatsoever
Provides for the pleasures of Saṃsāra
For himself alone,
Is called an inferior man.

He who turns his back to the pleasures of the world
And abstains from evil deeds,
But provides only for his own peace,
Is called a mediocre man.

He who seriously wants to dispel
All the misery of others,
Because in the stream of his own being he has understood the nature of misery,
Is an excellent man.

Yana is determined by capacity and propensity of the "precious human body" wrought by merit, not by a specific teaching or lineage, as Gampopa states:

Therefore, because of the difficulty of its attainment, of the uneasiness of its breaking down, and of its great usefulness, we should think of the body as a boat and by its means escape from the ocean of Saṃsāra. As is written:

Standing in the boat of the human body,
You should cross the great flood of misery.
Since later this boat is difficult to get,
Do not sleep now, you fool.

Empowerment, initiation, intention and endeavour may leaven capacity and propensity as may a graceful benediction of a person (in the sense of mindstream), object or place endowed or invested with holiness. In the teaching story abovementioned, Shakyamuni Buddhi and his sangha traverse the continuum directly in the body of their own experience rather than constructing a gradual vehicle for passage.

== Usage ==
In Buddhism and Hinduism, both yāna and mārga (road or path) are metaphors depicting spiritual practice as a path or journey. Ancient texts in both religions discuss doctrines and practices associated with various yānas. In Buddhism, yāna often expands the metaphor of the spiritual path with the idea of various vehicles that convey a person along that path. The yāna / mārga metaphor pervasive within Buddhism and other traditions is an analogue to the Chinese metaphor of the Tao: The Tao though is the Way as the endgoal and not just the art of wayfinding. The dialogic spiritual traditions of Indian and Chinese culture hold common cultural memes.

== Vedic origins of -yāna as a spiritual journey ==
The use of yāna to use as a name or to refer to a spiritual journey may date to the Ṛgveda, possibly composed circa 1500 BCE, whose 10th Mandala makes several references to devayāna, (translators usually render this as the "path of the gods" or similar) and one reference to pitṛyāna ("path of the fathers"). The first verse of the Ṛgveda's burial hymn (10.18) translates approximately as "O Death, take the other path, which is distinct from the way of the gods" (paraṃ mṛtyo anu parehi panthāṃ yaste sva itaro devayānāt). The "other path" is the pitṛyāna, referred to in hymn 10.2 and alluded to in 10.14 and 10.16.

The devayāna and pitṛyāna evolved from the ancient Rig Vedic concern for immortality to the classical Hindu concern with ending saṃsāric existence. The Upaniṣads, which comment on the Vedas, make further reference to devayāna and pitṛyāna. Among other distinctions, the pitryana was said to refer the religious practices of villagers, and the devayāna was said to refer to the practices of recluses living in the forest. The Bṛhadaraṇyaka Upaniṣad (II.iv.11 and IV.v.12) also makes reference to ekayāna, notably in the phrase vedānāṃ vāk ekayānam, where ekayānam connotes "one journey". The phrase translates approximately to " Sacred Vedas - intonation - (is the) one journey/destination", in the same sense that a river's journey is to the ocean.

== Yāna in early Buddhist texts ==
Yāna is one of ten suggested gifts (dana) that a lay person can appropriately give a monk or recluse, in the sense of providing a vehicle or transportation (e.g., see DN 7.33/PTS: A iv 59 and DN 10.177/PTS: A v 269).

The earliest explicit Buddhist use of -yāna in a metaphorical sense of a journey to awakening may be the term dhammayānam, "dharma chariot" (SN IV.4), where the vehicle itself serves as an extended metaphor for the Eightfold Path. Various parts of the chariot represent aspects of the Path (magga), e.g. axles represent meditation, the charioteer represents mindfulness, and so on.

Thus, metaphorical usage of yāna in the sense of a vehicle (as distinct from a path) emerged from a Buddhist context, and it did so relatively early in the evolution of Buddhism. Nevertheless, while the Pali Canon are very rich in images of wheels (cakka) and paths (magga) as metaphors for the journey to awakening, the Pali Canon rarely uses the term yāna for that purpose.

According to Fujita Kotatsu the term Three Vehicles does not occur in the Pâli tripitaka, however corresponding terms (trîni yânâni, triyâna, yânatraya) are used in the Ekottara Agama, the Mahavastu, and the Mahāvibhāṣa Śāstra. In these texts the Three Vehicles include the srâvakayâna, pratyekabuddhayâna, and buddhayâna.

== Enumeration of yānas in Mahayana texts ==
Mahayana texts are very rich in images of vehicles that serve in metaphors for journeys to awakening.

=== The three carts of expedient means: the parable of the burning house ===
The tradition of Mahayana texts employing the image of different types of vehicles and conveyances as salient metaphor for the journey of novice to the awakening of adept may have begun with the Lotus Sūtra. The Lotus Sūtra holds a parable of a devoted father with three small children entranced in childhood play within the family home, oblivious that tongues of flame are ravenously engulfing the house. The father entices the children from the burning home with the half-truth gilded promise of special carts for each of them. The carts though are only an expedient means for luring the children from the house.

Katō et al. render thus into English a tract of the Saddharma Puṇḍarīka pertaining to the cart of expedient means and the parable of the burning house:

"Śāriputra! Even as that elder, though with power in body and arms, yet does not use it but only by diligent tact resolutely saves [his] children from the calamity of the burning house and then gives each of them great carts made of precious things, so it is with the Tathāgata; though he has power and fearlessness, he does not use them, but only by his wise tact does he remove and save all living creatures from the burning house of the triple world, preaching the three vehicles: the śrāvaka, pratyekabuddha, and Buddha vehicle.

In the parable, the carts are explicitly identified as corresponding to the three types of Buddha: the goat-cart represents the practices leading to the attainment of Arhatship; the deer-cart, Pratyekabuddhahood; and the bullock-cart, Samyaksambuddhahood. The sutra goes on to say these that the teachings of the three vehicles are merely expedient means (upāya). Their purpose is to direct people toward ekayāna, the one vehicle, depicted in the parable as a jeweled cart driven by a white ox.

=== The relationship of Dharma (Law) and Yana ===
Tamura et al. render a section of the Innumerable Meanings Sutra (Wu-liang-i ching) that relates the relationship of the Law (Dharma) and various teachings as fundamentally determined by the audience and context:

"Good sons! The Law is like water that washes off dirt. As a well, a pond, a stream, a river, a valley stream, a ditch, or a great sea, each alike effectively washes off all kinds of dirt, so the Law-water effectively washes off the dirt of all delusions of living beings.
"Good sons! The nature of water is one, but a stream, a river, a well, a pond, a valley stream, a ditch, and a great sea are different from one another. The nature of the Law is like this. There is equality and no differentiation in washing off the dirt of delusions, but the three laws, the four merits, and the two ways^{§} are not one and the same.

"Good sons! Though each washes equally as water, a well is not a pond, a pond is not a stream or a river, nor is a valley stream or a ditch a sea. As the Tathāgata, the world's hero, is free in the Law, all the laws preached by him are also like this. Though preaching at the beginning, in the middle, and at the end all alike effectively wash off the delusions of living beings, the beginning is not the middle, and the middle is not the end. Preaching at the beginning, in the middle, and at the end are the same in expression but different from one another in meaning.

§ The three laws are the Four Noble Truths, the Twelve Causes, and the Six Pāramitās...; the four merits are srota-āpanna, sakṛdāgāmin, anāgāmin, and arhat...; and the two ways the great vehicle, or Mahayana, and the lesser vehicle, or Hinayana.

=== Ekayāna (one yana) ===
Mahayana texts such as the Lotus Sutra and the Avatamsaka Sutra sought to unite all the different teachings into a single great way. These texts serve as the inspiration for using the term Ekayāna in the sense of "one vehicle". This "one vehicle" became a key aspect of the doctrines and practices of Tiantai and Tendai Buddhist sects, which subsequently influenced Chán and Zen doctrines and practices. In Japan, the one-vehicle teaching of the Lotus Sutra also inspired the formation of the Nichiren sect.

=== Two yānas ===
Traditionally, the two vehicles in Mahāyāna Buddhism consist of Śrāvakayāna and Pratyekabuddhayāna. Mahāyāna Buddhists take a vow to become the third type, namely bodhisattvas. Therefore, Mahayana Buddhist texts sometimes use terms like "followers of the two vehicles" to refer to Buddhists who do not accept the Mahayana sutras.

Some Mahāyāna sutras consider that the two vehicles together comprise the Hīnayāna – literally, inferior vehicle; sometimes, small vehicle. Modern texts sometimes refer to Mahāyāna and Hīnayāna as "two vehicles". But referring to an "inferior vehicle" is often felt to be disrespectful to those Buddhists who do not consider the Mahāyāna sutras to be buddhavacana.

=== Three yānas ===
Mahāyāna Buddhists often express two different schemata of three yanas. First, here are three paths to liberation that culminate as one of the three types of Buddha:

- Śrāvakayāna: The Hearer vehicle: A path that meets the goals of an arhat who achieves liberation after listening to the teachings of a samyaksambuddha (fully enlightened buddha).
- Pratyekabuddhayāna: The Pratyekabuddha achieves liberation, but does not teach other beings. Pratyekabuddhas do not depend on a teacher and can discover the Dharma even if they do not encounter a buddha. They are sometimes said to remain silent and solitary.
- Bodhisattvayāna: The bodhisattva attains liberation and wishes to benefit as many beings as possible. A bodhisattva who has accomplished this goal is called a samyaksambuddha. A samyaksambuddha can establish the Dharma and lead disciples to enlightenment.

A second classification came into use with the rise of the Vajrayāna, which created a hierarchy of the teachings with the Vajrayāna being the highest path. The Vajrayāna itself became multilayered especially in Tibetan Buddhism.

- Hīnayāna
- Mahāyāna
- Vajrayāna

When the historical Buddha Shakyamuni taught, he gave teachings appropriate to the individual capacities of his students. The Hinayana was taught to those with lesser capacity with an emphasis on actions of body and speech. Mahayana was taught to those with greater capacity with an emphasis on actions of mind and Vajrayana was taught to those exceptional beings who were able to directly realise the nature of mind. Outwardly on a conventional level, these teachings and practices may appear contradictory but on an ultimate level, they all have the same goal.

=== Four yānas ===
Mahayana Buddhists sometimes refer to four yanas that subsume the two different schemes of the three yanas:

- Śrāvakayāna
- Pratyekabuddhayāna
- Mahāyāna
- Vajrayāna

=== Five yānas ===
This is a Mahāyāna list which is found in East Asian Buddhism.

- Puruṣayāna - the human vehicle. This is the very beginning of the spiritual path
- Devayāna - the practice of ethics and meditation
- Śrāvakayāna - the practice of renunciation and the Four Noble Truths
- Pratyekabuddhayāna - practice concerned with dependent arising (pratitya-samutpada)
- Bodhisattvayāna - practice of the Six Perfections

=== Six yānas ===
The five yānas plus the Vajrayāna. This schema is associated with Shingon Buddhism in Japan. It was invented by Kūkai in order to help to differentiate the Vajrayāna teachings that he imported from China in the early 9th century. Kūkai wanted to show that the new teachings were entirely new.

=== Nine yānas ===
The Nyingma school of Tibetan Buddhism has nine yanas, a list made by combining the first type of three yanas, and adding the six classes of tantras.

- Hīnayāna
  - 1. Śrāvakayāna
  - 2. Pratyekabuddhayāna
- Mahāyāna consisting of:
  - 3. Bodhisattvayāna
  - Vajrayāna, consisting of:
    - Outer Tantras
      - 4. Kriyatantra
      - 5. Upatantra (Tibetan spyod rgyud) ‘practice tantra’ and the Ubhayatantra (gnyis ka’i rgyud), ‘dual tantra’, because it practices the view of the next vehicle, Yogatantra, together with the action of the former.
      - 6. Yogatantra
    - Inner Tantras
      - 7. Mahāyoga
      - 8. Anuyoga
      - 9. Atiyoga (also Dzogchen)

The head of the Nyingma school, Dudjom Rinpoche emphasizes the eight lower vehicles are intellectually fabricated and contrived:

The eight lower levels have intellectually fabricated and contrived that which is changeless solely due to fleeting thoughts that never experience what truly is. They apply antidotes to and reject that which is not to be rejected. They refer to as flawed that in which there is nothing to be purified, with a mind that desires purification. They have created division with respect to that which cannot be obtained by their hopes and fears that it can be obtained elsewhere. And they have obscured wisdom, which is naturally present, by their efforts in respect to that which is free from effort and free from needing to be accomplished. Therefore, they have had no chance to make contact with genuine, ultimate reality as it is (rnal ma'i de kho na nyid).

=== Twelve yānas ===
Another schema associated with Mahāyāna and Vajrayāna sources:

1. Śrāvakayāna
2. Pratyekabuddhayāna
3. Bodhisattvayāna
4. Kriyayoga
5. Charyayoga (or Upayoga)
6. Yogatantra
7. Mahayoga
8. Anuyoga
9. Atiyoga
  1. Semde
  2. Longdé
  3. Mengagde

== See also ==
- Navayana
- Vahana
