= Classes of Tantra in Tibetan Buddhism =

Categorization of Buddhist tantric scriptures in Indo-Tibetan Buddhism

Classes of Tantra in Tibetan Buddhism is the categorization of Buddhist tantric scriptures in Tibetan Buddhism. Tibetan Buddhism inherited numerous tantras and forms of tantric practice from medieval Indian Buddhist Tantra. There were various ways of categorizing these tantras in India. In Tibet, the Sarma (New Translation) schools categorize tantric scriptures into four classes, while the Nyingma (Ancients) school use six classes of tantra.

== Sarma ("New Translation") classification ==
The Sarma, "New Translation" schools of Tibetan Buddhism (Gelug, Sakya, Kagyu, Jonang) classify tantric practices and texts into four classes. In this, they follow Indian Tantric Buddhists such as Abhayākara, who makes this distinction in his Clusters of Quintessential Instructions. Tantras are classified according to the capacity of persons, the deities they use, the specific types of methods they employ and how they use desire (kama).

=== Kriyā ===
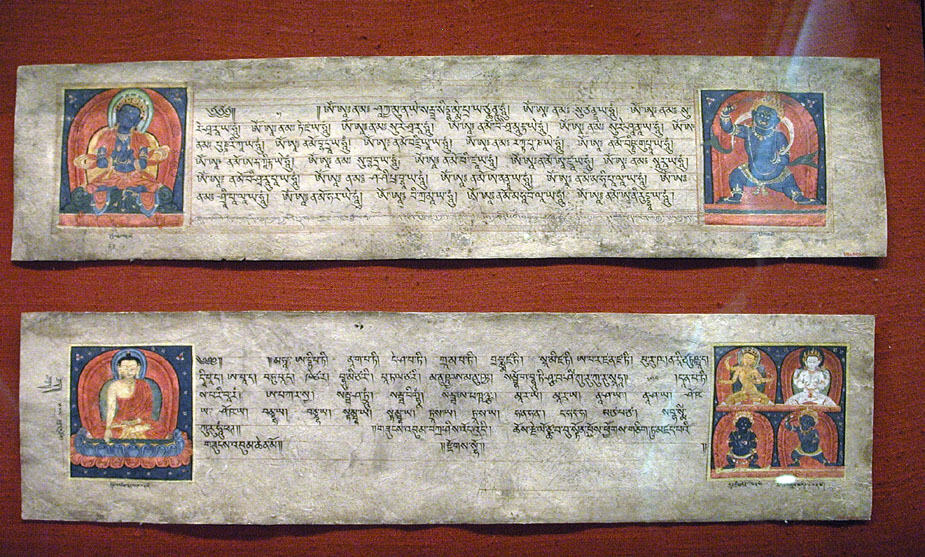
Illuminated Pages from a Dispersed DharanI Manuscript

Kriyā (Tib. bya ba, Action) tantras were taught for practitioners of lower ability who have an inclination for performing many external ritual activities for protection and purification purposes, such as ritual bathing, the sprinkling of scented water, the creation of a circle of protection, the use of mudras and the chanting of mantras. There are also various prescriptions dealing with eating, drinking, and clothing. According to Kongtrul, in Kriyā Yoga, one relates to the deity as a subject relates to their lord and only meditates on an external deity (not on oneself as being the deity).

According to Kongtrul, "the essence of action tantra" is:

to view the profound truth with fear and apprehension due to an inferior intellect and to observe utmost cleanliness and purity, ablution, asceticism, and so forth; to not develop the pride of being the deity since there is no generation of oneself as the pledge deity; to be without the supreme bliss of the pristine awareness deity since the pristine awareness deity has not been invoked to merge into the pledge deity; not to be a receptacle for the sublime teachings since one is unqualified to receive teachings on what is sublime and extraordinary, the deep meanings that were spoken with specific intention; and due to the shortcoming of being unable to fathom the sublime, being conditioned by concepts about the purity or impurity of things, to train thoroughly in rituals of ablution, and so forth, and thereby to practice deity yoga in a subject-to-lord relationship with the deity.

Regarding initiation, The Essence of Pristine Awareness states: "it is widely known that in action tantra there are the water and crown initiations."

Each action tantra text generally centers on a particular Buddha or Bodhisattva, and many are based on dharanis. Some of these texts are actually titled "sutra" or "dharani". Action tantra includes various practices for deities such as Medicine Buddha, "the eleven faced" Chenrezig and Vajrapani. Examples of Action Tantra texts include:

- Mahāmegha Sutra,
- Sacred Golden Light Sutra, notably a very popular sutra in East Asia
- Dharani of the Eleven-Faced Avalokiteshvara
- Marichi Dharani
- Ārya-mañjushrī-mūla-kalpa, which notably states that mantras taught in the Saiva, Garuda and Vaisnava tantras will be effective if applied by Buddhists since they were all taught originally by Manjushri.
- Subhāhu-pariprcchā (Dialogue with Subahu),
- Secret General Tantra
- Susidhi Tantra
- Manjushri Root Tantra
- Supreme Knowledge of Vajrapani Tantra
- Aparimitāyur-jñāna-hrdaya-dhāranī.
- Heart Sutra (Prajñāpāramitāhṛdaya, which contains a mantra).

Regarding the practice of deity yoga in Action Tantra, Kongtrul outlines six main elements or deities, namely "Emptiness, letter, sound, form, Seal, and sign":

First, the deity as emptiness is to remain absorbed in emptiness, the essence of ultimate awakening mind, in which the essential principle of oneself and that of the deity are of an inseparability beyond concepts. Second, the deity as letter is to meditate on the particular deity [one is practicing] in the form of the written letters of the [deity’s] mantra resting on a moon disk (representing one’s mind) visualized in space [in front]. Also considered to be the letter deity is to meditate simply on the moon [omitting the letters]. Third, the deity as sound is to meditate on the resonant sounds of the mantra (on the moon) associated with one of the [three] deities of the three families to which the recitation practice for complete familiarization is directed. Fourth, the deity as form is to meditate on the complete form of the deity. [The first step involves] meditating that light radiating from the letters of the mantra fulfills two aims; then, [as the light reconverges, the letters] transform into the deity’s complete form. Fifth, the deity as seal is to perform the hand mudras for blessing, such as the mudra of the crown protrusion, and while reciting the appropriate mantra, to touch the corresponding places of the body with the mudra. Alternatively, one makes the pledge mudra of that particular [family]. Sixth, the deity as sign is to recall, in all circumstances, the form of the deity as meditated in the state of equipoise so that the appearances of the outer world and its inhabitants are regarded as pure visions, imagined as the deity’s residence, form, and resources.

=== Caryā ===
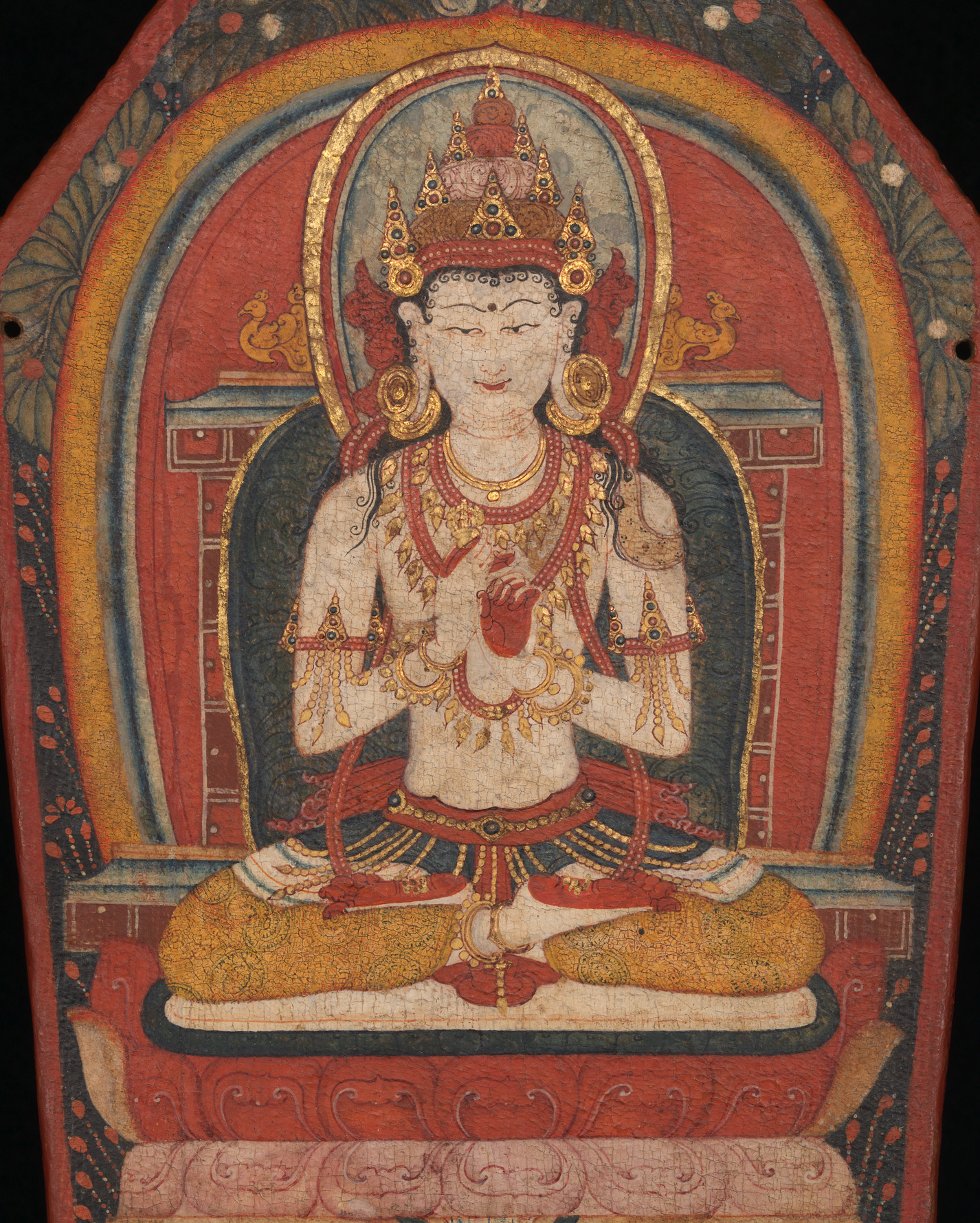
Panel from a Tibetan Buddhist Ritual Crown Depicting Buddha Vairocana, late 13th–early 14th century.

Caryā (spyod pa, Performance, or Conduct) tantras are meant for practitioners of middle ability. According to Tsongkhapa, it is for "those who balance external activities and internal meditative stabilization without relying on very many activities." The kind of desire it uses is the weakest kind, comparable to a couple looking at each other. They are also known as Upa tantra, or Ubhaya tantra.

Although these tantras maintain numerous external ritual actions, the emphasis is now upon obtaining liberation through meditation. It is thus seen as maintaining a balance between inner and outer actions. It is externally similar to Kriyā tantra, and internally similar to Yoga tantra.

According to Kongtrul, the main elements of Conduct tantra are:

To practice and train thoroughly in a vast range of deeds related to activations, which are sets of outer (physical and verbal) [actions] such as mudras and other characteristic focuses as taught in action tantra, and thus [to have] objects of practice that accord with that tantra; to cultivate inner (mental) contemplation that accords with yogatantra and to practice [deity yoga] in what is like a friend-to-friend relation-ship with the deity.

Kongtrul further states, "conduct tantra is known to have five initiations: water, diadem, vajra, bell, and name."

In this class of tantras, Vairochana is a principal deity. In Tibetan Buddhism, this tantra class includes practice lineages for the Mahãvairocanãbhisaṃbodhitantra ('Awakening of Great Vairocana'), for the Vajrapãṇyabhiṣekamahãtantra (Vajrapāṇi Initiation Tantra) and for Manjushri.

The presence of Buddha Vairocana is often evident in tantras of this class where he is often depicted in the centre of a mandala with four other Buddhas of his retinue placed to the four quarters, the cardinal directions. Importantly, during the Caryā tantra class and literary period, there developed the salient innovation wherein the sadhaka is to cultivate identification with the deity in meditative absorption (known as "self generation"). This class of literature was also important to Chinese Zhenyan Buddhism and tantric masters such as Śubhakarasiṃha (637-735), Vajrabodhi (671–741) and Amoghavajra (705–774). This focus was later imparted by Amoghavajra's disciple Huiguo (746-805) to the monk Kūkai (774–835), leading to the development of Japanese Shingon Buddhism.

Guarisco & McLeod explain Jamgon Kongtrul's codification of this class as follows:

Conduct tantra, where conduct encompasses both outer ritual activity and inner contemplation, involves training in a vast range of deeds while entering the inner reality that presents itself in visual and audible divine representations. The notion here is that of being close to the state of a perfect divine being, a state not yet fully realized. This limited view is overcome by visualizing oneself as the deity, understanding that form to be the appearance aspect of emptiness.

In Caryā yoga, the yogi visualizes themselves as the 'commitment being' (Sanskrit: samayasattva) and visualizes the 'gnosis being' (jñānasattva), who is envisioned in the relationship of a spiritual friend, in front of them. Various "meditations with signs" are part of this practice including: bija (seed syllable) and mandala visualization, mudra (hand seals), repetition of mantras, etc. as found in Action tantra. Conduct yoga also includes a special "yoga without signs", described by Kongtrul as follows:

The special yoga without signs is cultivated in conjunction with three minds: the minds of entering, abiding, and emerging, the essence of which is the ultimate awakening mind itself. The mind of entering is the realization of the unborn nature of all phenomena (the aggregates, etc.) gained by examining them in terms of the four extremes; the mind of abiding, the direct realization of the unborn nature as the essence of the nonconceptual state; and the mind of emerging, the ensuing great compassion directed to-ward suffering beings who lack such realization.

=== Yoga ===
Yoga tantra or naljor (rnal’byor) is, according to Tsongkhapa, meant for practitioners of high ability who "mainly rely on meditative stabilization and rely on only few external activities." The level of desire they use is said to be similar to a couple holding hands or embracing. "Yoga" refers to the union or yoking of method and wisdom. One sees one's body, speech and mind as inseparably united with those of the deity.

Kongtrul defines Yoga tantra thus:

Yoga tantra is so named because it emphasizes the inner yoga meditation of method and wisdom; or alternatively, because based on knowledge and understanding of all aspects of the profound ultimate truth and the vast relative truth, it emphasizes contemplation that inseparably unites these two truths.

Yoga tantra is the last and highest of the outer tantras, and here external rites are seen as much less important than internal practices. The empowerments given are the empowerment of the 5 Buddha families, and the empowerment of the Vajra master, and disciples must take on the commitments of the 5 buddha families, and take the tantric vows. The path is split into 4 seals; the great seal of body, the seal of the speech of Dharma, the seal of the mind of commitment, and the seal of enlightened actions.

Some Vajrasattva practices fall under this category, as well as the Tattvasaṃgraha Tantra (Summation of Essential Principles) and the Vajraśekhara Tantra (Indestructible Peak). Other Yoga tantras include the All-Secret Tantra, the Victorious in the Three Worlds Tantra; and the Glorious Supreme Original Being. While Vairochana maintains his position as principal deity, he is now envisaged as being in the center of 5 buddha families instead of 3, each family belonging to one of the Five Tathagathas.

The Shurangama Sutra and the Shurangama Mantra from which it (called the Shitatapatra Ushnisha Dharani) comes can be included in this category.

=== Unsurpassable Yoga ===
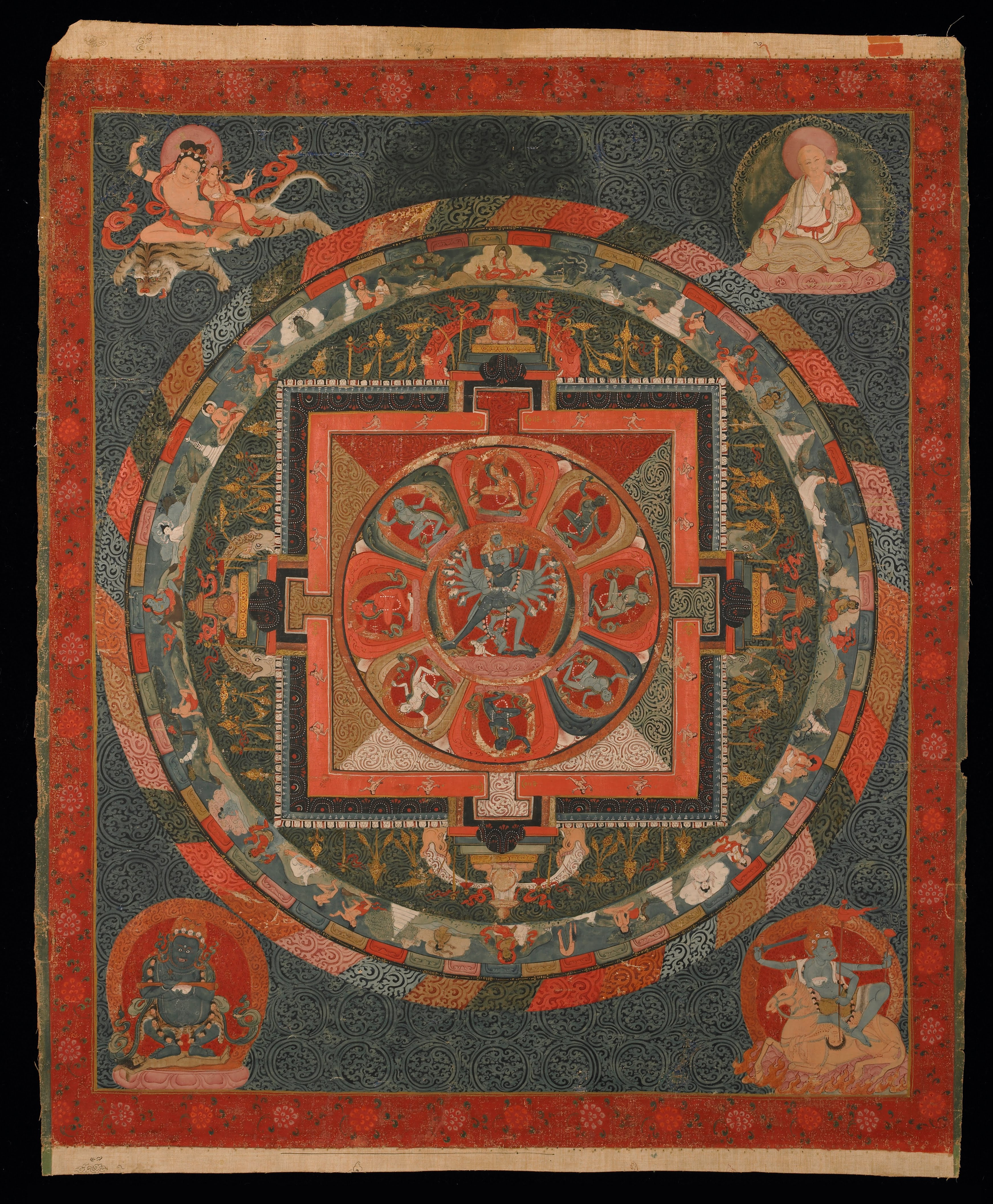
A Hevajra Mandala

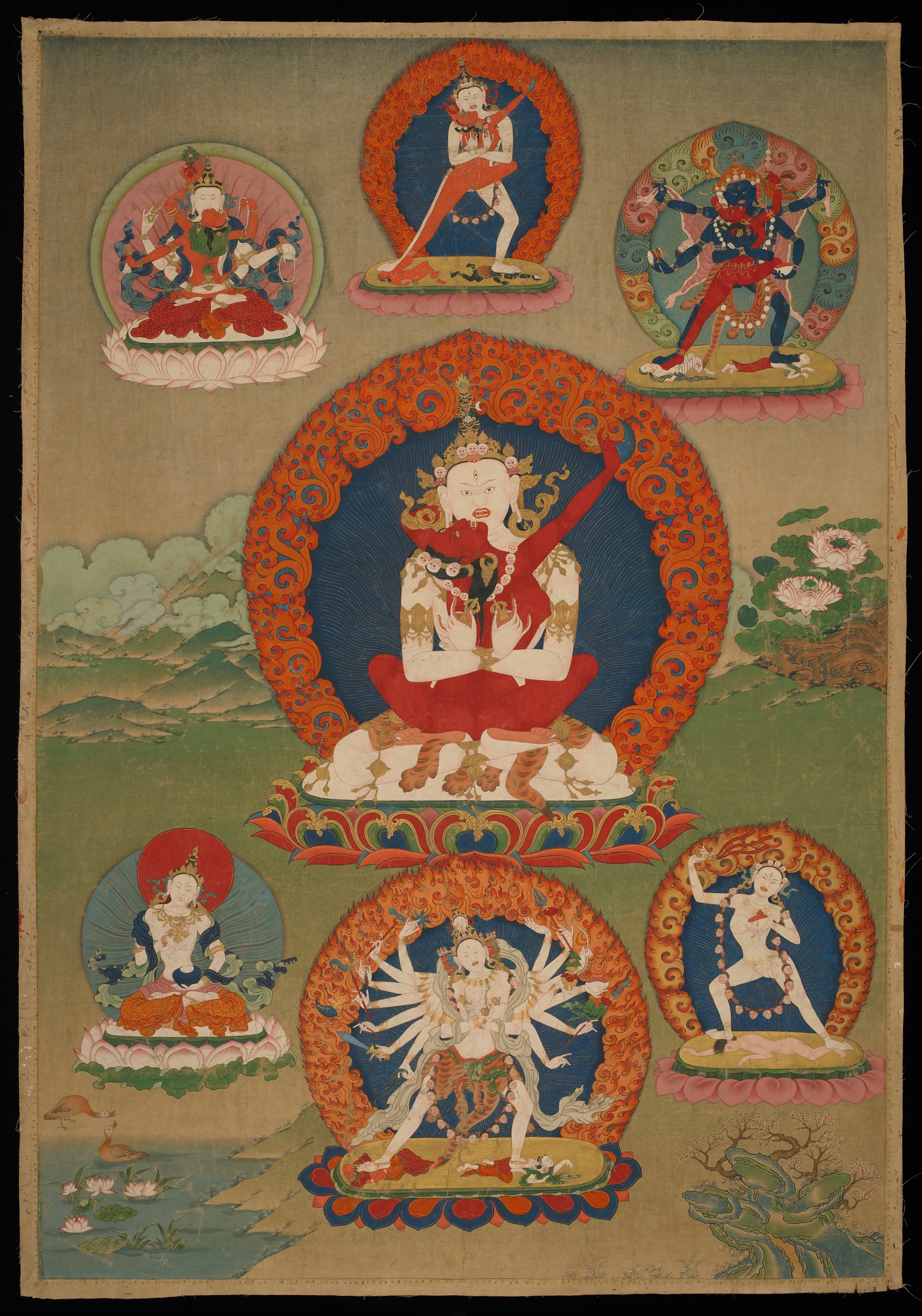
Deities of the Chakrasamvara Tantra

Anuttarayoga tantras (rnal ’byor bla med, Unexcelled or Unsurpassable yoga tantras), also known as Yoganiruttaratantra, are meant for practitioners of the highest ability who do not rely on external activities. It uses the highest level of desire, sexual union, and is thus also designated the “tantra of union of the two.” According to Kongtrul, only Highest Yoga includes both the generation and completion phases. Kongtrul states that these are "supreme among all tantras" and "there is no other tantra above it."

Anuttarayoga is characterized by the practice of Deity Yoga as well as various subtle body yogas (such as the six Dharmas of Naropa), to generate great bliss and attain the subtle clear light (luminous) mind. According to Miranda Shaw, Anuttarayoga Tantra texts "have remained at the forefront of contemplation, ritual, and interpretation throughout the Himalayan Buddhist sphere".

In the classification of the Dzogchen system, used by the Nyingma, it is considered equivalent to the Mahayoga tantras. The Dalai Lama XIV states: "old translation Dzogchen and new translation anuttarayoga tantra offer equivalent paths that can bring the practitioner to the same resultant state of Buddhahood".

Kongtrul describes the essence of Unsurpassed Yoga Tantra as being

In the midst of an entourage of queens, in the form of an all-powerful sovereign such as Heruka (in mother tantra) or Vairochana (in father tantra); and by means of the contemplation of the great bliss of the male and female deities’ union, to be the “king who resides in the castle” (as is said in the tantras), which means to dwell perfectly in the queen’s bhaga, that is, in the divine palace in the source of phenomena; to train according to the sublime vajra words, the statements of six parameters—interpretable, non-interpretable, provisional, definitive, standard, and coined terminology—which are contrary to worldly human customs (as is said in the tantras, “Success is rapidly achieved by relying on one’s mother, sister, or daughter”) by performing extremely base acts; and thereby to effect ordinary and supreme powers.

This statement contains various tantric terms to express the nature of Unsurpassed Tantra. Bhaga (ultimately) refers to the source of phenomena (chos ’byung, dharmodaya), or source of all awakened qualities, and also literally to the vagina of a female sexual consort (i.e. the queen, btsun mo). Thus this statement references karmamudra, sexual union, which is a key element of the symbolism, thought and practice of Unsurpassed Yoga Tantras and which generates a great blissful consciousness (the "castle of great bliss") that is then directed to understanding ultimate reality. Furthermore, when the tantras speak of relying on one's mothers, sisters etc., this refers to different types of tantric consorts. Regarding the six parameters, this refers to "six levels of meaning in the content of the tantras" which express different ways of interpreting and understanding the tantras.

==== Tantras ====
Anuttarayoga tantras which became prominent in Tibet include:

- Cakrasaṃvara Tantra
- Mañjuśrīnāmasaṃgīti (Reciting the names of Manjushri)
- Sampuṭodbhavaḥ (Emergence from Samputa)
- Caṇḍamahāroṣaṇa Tantra
- Guhyasamāja (Esoteric Community)
- Vajramahābhairava Tantra (Great Vajra Terrifier Tantra)
- Hevajra Tantra
- Kṛṣnayamāri Tantra (Black Yamari)
- Raktayamāri Tantra (Red Yamari)
- Mahāmāyā Tantra
- Mahākāla Tantra
- Kālacakra Tantra
- Ekajaṭa Tantra

In Sarma, they are sometimes further classified into "Father Tantras" (Wyl. pha rgyud), "Mother Tantras" (ma rgyud) and "Non-Dual Tantras" (gnyis med kyi rgyud).

The mahāyoga-tantras of Pala Empire India became known in Tibet as 'Father Tantras' (pha rgyud). According to the Gelug view, following Tsongkhapa's reasoning, Father Tantras emphasize the creation of a Buddha form through the cultivation of an illusory body, on the basis of practices with the energy system of the subtle body. Earlier Sakya masters and Kagyu scholars had viewed Father Tantras as emphasising the practice of blissful awareness. Father Tantras have also been seen as emphasizing the use of anger (pratigha) as the path of practice, focusing on the emptiness aspect of Buddha nature.

The yoginī-tantras which became known in Tibet as 'Mother Tantras' (ma rgyud) emphasize the development of enlightened awareness (the "mind" of the illusory body) through the cultivation of the fundamental pure mind of all beings, known as 'brilliance' (prabhāsvara) (frequently translated, following the Tibetan, as 'clear light'). They are considered to emphasize the utilization of desire (tṛṣṇā) as the path of practice, focusing on the brilliant (prabhāsvara) aspect of Buddha nature. Among the Mother Tantras, the most prominent is the Cakrasaṃvara. The practice of Vajrayogini evolved out of the Cakrasaṃvara practice and is now a de facto practice in its own right (Vajrayogini being the consort of Cakrasamvara). Other Mother Tantras are Hevajra Tantra and Caṇḍamahāroṣaṇa.

Non-dual tantras utilize both anger and desire as an antidote to delusion (avidyā), focusing on both the physical and mental, void and brilliant, aspects of enlightened mind. The example typically put forth for this category is the Kālacakra Tantra. The Sakya tradition also considers Hevajra to be a non-dual tantra but other traditions classify it as a yoginī-tantra. The practice of Yamantaka is also directed towards this aim.

== Nyingma classification ==
The Nyingma school meanwhile, has six main tantra categories, which make up the last six of the main Nyingma "nine yana" schema. According to Jean-Luc Achard, "in the Nyingma tradition, there are several ways of classifying the teachings of the Buddha into nine, ten, and sometimes twelve Vehicles. Most of these classifications have not survived in practical usage, except for that into nine. In this case, the ninth is considered to be the Vehicle of Dzogchen."

The first three categories are essentially the same as the Sarma classification (Kriyā, Caryā or Ubhaya, and Yoga) and are called "Outer Tantras".

The last three are the "Inner Tantras": Mahāyoga, Anuyoga and Atiyoga.

- Mahāyoga (rnal ’byor chen po), is a class of tantric texts and practices that emphasize the stage of generation and are sometimes also termed father tantras. The Net of Magical Manifestation (Māyājāla) collection contains the major Mahayoga works, The Guhyagarbha Tantra is the most influential of these.
- Anuyoga (rjes su rnal ’byor) texts are associated with tantras that emphasize the stage of completion and are associated with mother tantras. They also teach a "principle of instantaneous perfection", which is not found in other tantras. An example of one of these texts is the All-Unifying Pure Presence (Kun ’dus rig pa’i mdo).
- Atiyoga (Dzogchen). In Nyingma, Dzogchen ("Great Perfection") is seen as a non-gradual method which transcends the two stages of tantric yoga and focuses on direct access to the innate purity of things. Atiyoga is further divided into three main categories: Mind Series (semde), Space Series (longdé) and Instruction Series (menngakde). There are numerous tantras and texts associated with this vehicle, such as the Kunjed Gyalpo and the "Seventeen tantras of the esoteric instruction cycle" (man ngag sde'i rgyud bcu bdun).

According to Longchenpa's Great Chariot:

Mahāyoga, the father tantra, the nature of method [related to] appearance, [is taught] to benefit those whose strongest emotional affliction is aversion and who are subject to excessive discursiveness. Anuyoga, the mother tantra, the wisdom of the completion phase [related to] the essential reality of emptiness, [is taught] to benefit those whose strongest emotional affliction is desire and who delight in stillness of mind. Atiyoga, the nature of nonduality, [is taught] to benefit those whose strongest emotional affliction is delusion and who are tarnished by [attachment to] effort.

Longchenpa's Finding Comfort and Ease in the Nature of Mind states:

Mahayoga emphasizes winds and the methods of the generation phase. Anuyoga emphasizes the constituent [of bliss] and the wisdom of the completion phase; Atiyoga emphasizes pristine awareness from which nothing is separate.

Regarding the alternative schemas which are now rarely used in Nyingma, Achard writes:

In the classification into twelve Vehicles (such as in the surviving proto-doxographical works of O rgyan gling pa), Dzogchen is the ninth Vehicle as usual, but it is composed of three subdivisions which are also styled Vehicles (theg pa). In this case, Dzogchen is equated with Ati yoga. Then, the tenth Vehicle is that of the sPyi ti yoga; the eleventh is that of the Yang ti yoga; and the twelfth is the vehicle of the Great Limit (mtha’ chen). Such references to higher categories of Dzogchen teachings, said to surpass those of Ati yoga stricto sensu, have survived at least down to the revelations of mChog gyur gling pa in the 19th century. Since then, practically no one has used these unusual categories, especially that of the Great Limit which remains more than obscure.

== See also ==
- Buddhist texts
- Tantras (Hinduism)
