= Guhyasamāja Tantra =

Important scriptures of Tantric Buddhism

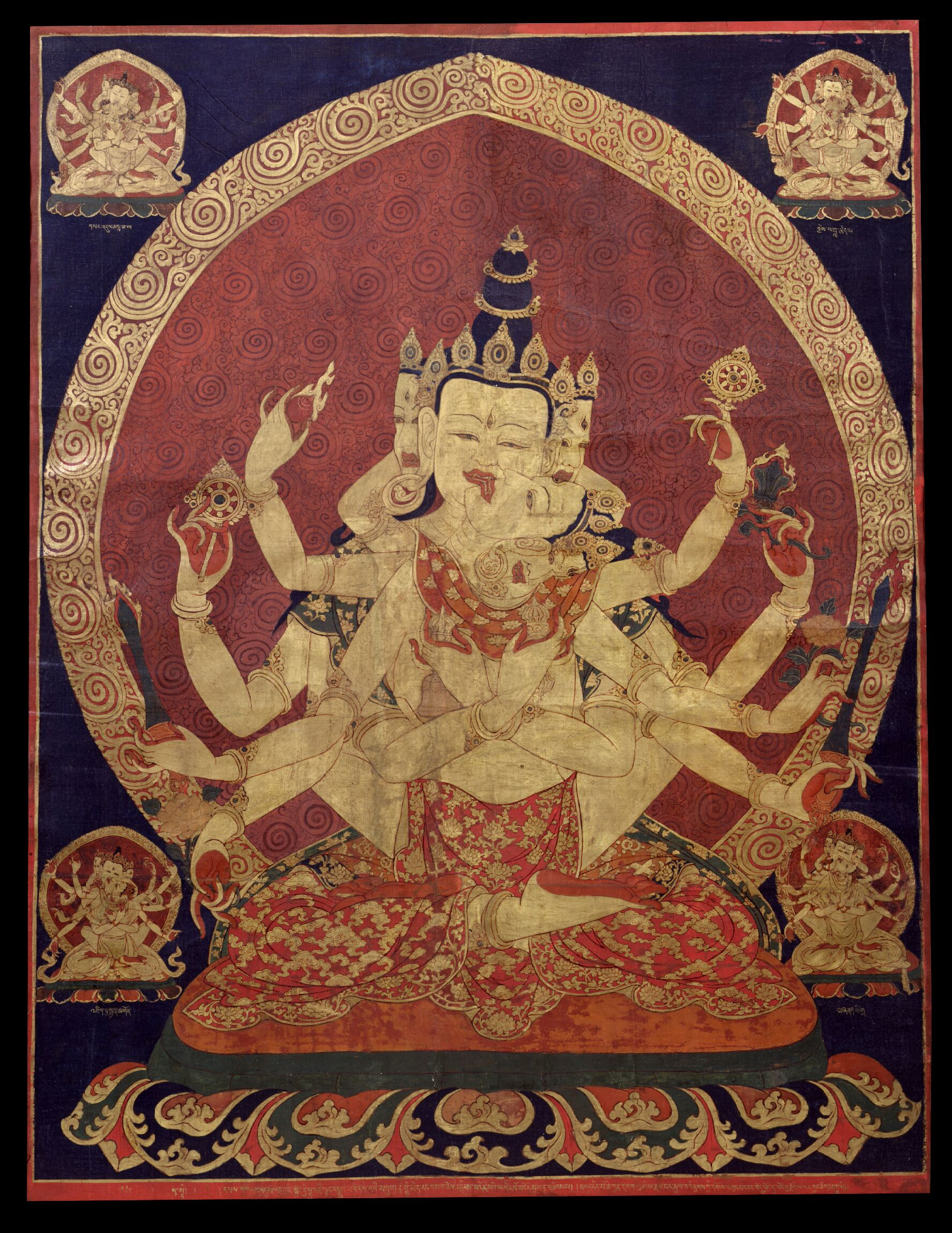
Thangka of Akṣobhyavajra in union with his consort Sparshavajrā, 17th century, Rubin Museum of Art

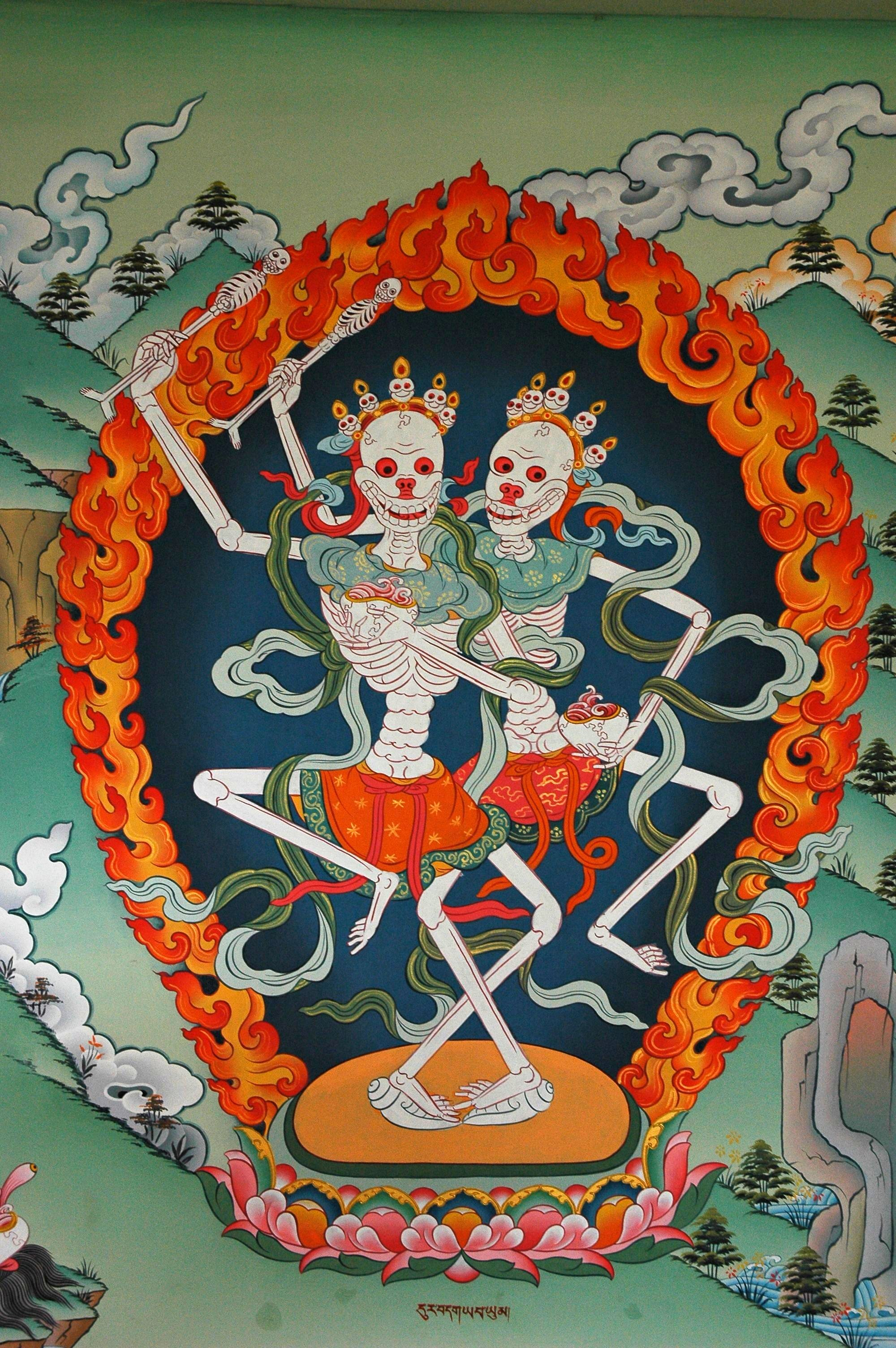
The Citipati as depicted in a painting in the Gelugpa Monastery, Nepal.

The Guhyasamāja Tantra (Sanskrit: गुह्यसमाजतंत्र, romanized: Guhyasamājatantra, lit. 'Tantra of the Secret Society/Community'; Tibetan: གསང་འདུས་རྩ་རྒྱུད, Wylie: gsang 'dus rtsa rgyud), Tōhoku Catalogue No. (Toh) 442, also known as the Tathāgataguhyaka (Secrets of the Tathagata), is one of the most important scriptures of Tantric Buddhism, written in Sanskrit. In its fullest form, it consists of seventeen chapters, though a separate "explanatory tantra" (vyākhyātantra) known as the Later Tantra (Sanskrit: गुह्यसमाज उत्तरातंत्र, romanized: Guhyasamāja Uttaratantra; Tibetan: རྒྱུད་ཕྱི་མ, Wylie: rgyud phyi ma), Toh 443, is sometimes considered to be its eighteenth chapter. Many scholars believe that the original core of the work consisted of the first twelve chapters, with chapters thirteen to seventeen being added later as explanatory material.

The Guhyasamāja-tantra is not to be confused with the Mahayana sutra titled Tathāgataguhyaka Sūtra.

In India, it was classified as a Yoga or Mahāyoga Tantra. In Tibet it is considered an Unexcelled Yoga Tantra (rnal ’byor bla med rgyud). It develops traditions found in earlier scriptures such as the Compendium of Reality (Sanskrit: Sarva-tathāgata-tattva-saṃgraha; De bzhin gshegs pa thams cad kyi de kho na nyid bsdus pa (Toh 479)) but is focused to a greater extent on the antinomian aspects characteristic of the later Buddhist Tantras. Naropa and Aryadeva considered the Compendium of Reality to be a root tantra in relation to the Guhyasamaja Tantra. The Guhyasamaja Tantra survives in Sanskrit manuscripts and in Tibetan and Chinese translation.

The Guhyasiddhi of Padmavajra, a work associated with the Guhyasamaja tradition, prescribes acting as a Saiva guru and initiating members into Shaiva Siddhanta scriptures and mandalas. Due to the text's radical methodology, both beautification and warning statues or paintings were created. The beautified one is Yab-Yum, and the warning one is Citipati.

== Origin ==
As with most tantras, there are different traditions and transmissions. Perhaps the oldest surviving lineage is the Jñānapada Tradition (ye shes zhabs lugs), which goes back to Buddhaśrijñāna (late 8th century). The most important historically is the Ārya tradition (gsang 'dus 'phags lugs) which is based on commentaries attributed to Nāgārjuna, Āryadeva, and Candrakīrti. 'Gos Lotsawa Khug pa lhas btsas originated a transmission in Tibet, as did Marpa Lotsawa. The Sakya tradition received both transmissions. Tsongkhapa, founder of the Gelug tradition, considered the Esoteric Community to be the most important of the tantras and used the Ārya tradition as a template for interpreting all the other tantric traditions.

== Iconography ==
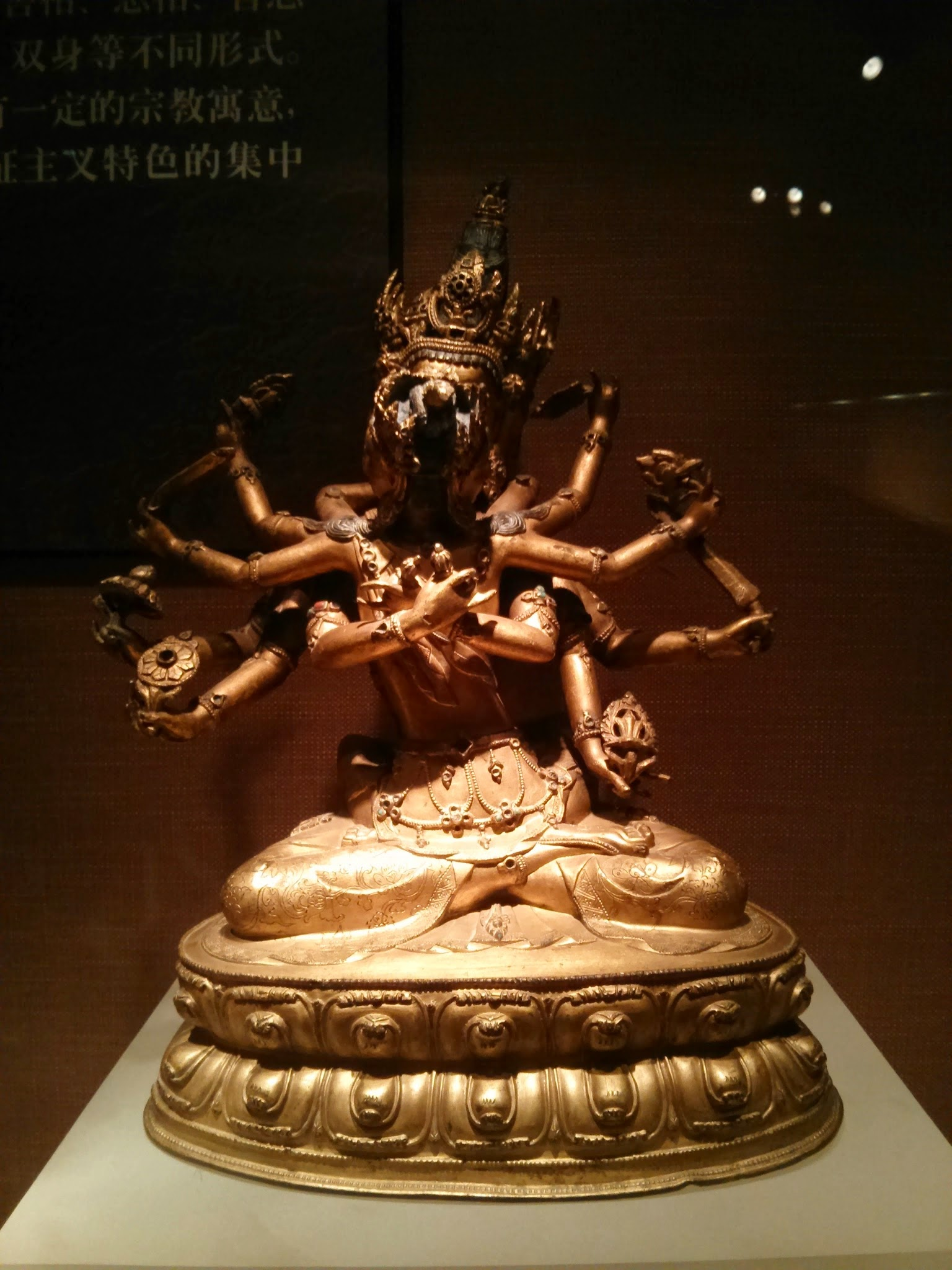
Statue of Guhyasamaja in union with consort, Capital Museum

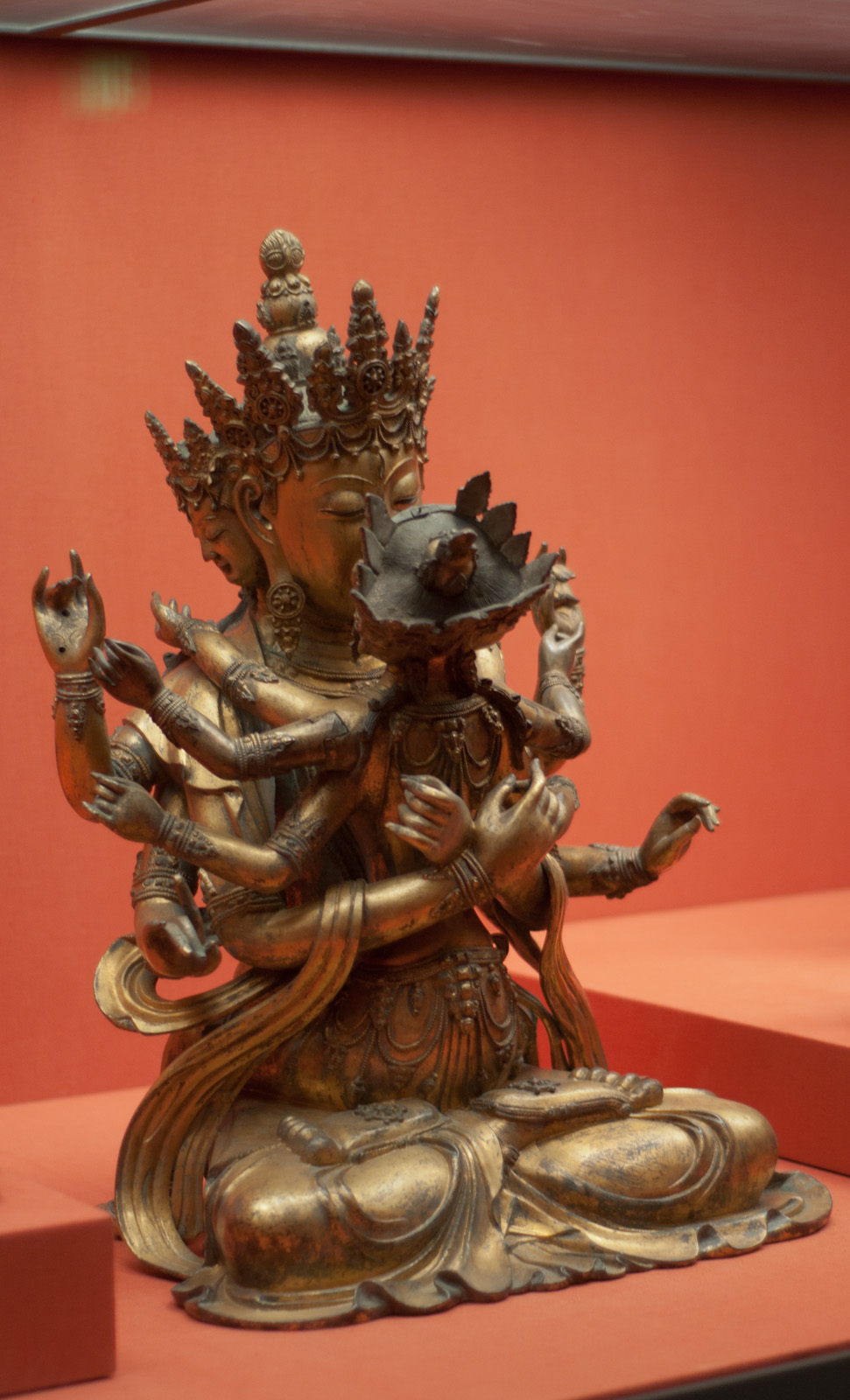
Statue of Guhyasamāja Tantra, Age of Ming China, the Asian Art Museum (San Francisco).

There are two main commentarial traditions on the Guhyasamāja Tantra, the Ārya Tradition and the Jñānapada tradition.

In the practice of the Ārya Tradition, the central deity of the Guhyasamāja is blue-black Akṣobhyavajra, a form of Akṣobhya, one of the five tathāgathas (pañcatathāgata), sometimes called the dhyāni buddhas. Akṣobhyavajra holds a vajra and bell (ghanta) in his first two hands, and other hands hold the symbols of the four other tathāgathas: wheel of Vairocana and lotus of Amitābha in his rights, and gem of Ratnasambhava and sword of Amoghasiddhi in his lefts. The maṇḍala consists of thirty-two deities in all.

In the Jñānapada tradition, the central deity is yellow Mañjuvajra, a form of Maṇjuśrī, with nineteen deities in the mandala. Mañjuvajra has three faces—the right one is white and red one on the left—and six arms. The three faces may represent the three main channels of the subtle body, the three stages of purification of the mind or the illusory body, light, and their union. Mañjuvajra holds in his hands a sword and a book, and two of his other hand a bow and arrow represent skillful means (upāya).

== Offering goddesses ==
In the context of the Guhyasamaja Tantra, the offering goddesses are a key component of the mandala, particularly in the Ārya tradition, where they are associated with ritual offerings that symbolize the transformation of sensory experiences into spiritual practice. These goddesses are typically grouped into sets of four or eight, depending on the specific tradition or mandala configuration. Below, is a list of the four and eight offering goddesses as they appear in the Guhyasamaja Tantra.

=== Four Offering Goddesses in the Guhyasamaja Tantra ===
The four offering goddesses are commonly associated with the primary sensory offerings in the Guhyasamaja mandala, particularly in the Ārya tradition. They are:

- Vajralāsyā (Dance): Represents the offering of dance or aesthetic pleasure, symbolizing the transformation of bodily movement into a spiritual act.
- Vajragītā (Song): Represents the offering of song or music, symbolizing the transformation of sound and voice.
- Vajrapuṣpā (Flowers): Represents the offering of flowers, symbolizing beauty and the sense of sight.
- Vajradhūpā (Incense): Represents the offering of incense, symbolizing fragrance and the sense of smell.

=== Eight Offering Goddesses ===
In expanded mandalas, particularly in the Ārya tradition, the Guhyasamaja Tantra includes eight offering goddesses, which incorporate the four listed above plus four additional goddesses associated with further sensory or ritual offerings.

- Vajrālokā (Light): Represents the offering of light or lamps, symbolizing illumination and the dispelling of ignorance.
- Vajragandhā (Perfume): Represents the offering of perfume or scent, further emphasizing the sense of smell.
- Vajranaivedyā (Food): Represents the offering of food, symbolizing sustenance and the sense of taste.
- Vajraśabdā (Sound): Represents the offering of sound (sometimes music or divine sound), complementing Vajragītā by focusing on the broader auditory experience.

== See also ==
- Vajrayana
- Dakinis
