= Mahayoga =

Buddhist tantra

Mahāyoga (Sanskrit for "great yoga") is the designation of the first of the three Inner Tantras according to the ninefold division of practice used by the Nyingma school of Tibetan Buddhism.

Mahāyoga is held to emphasise the generation stage (or "development stage") of Tantra, where the succeeding two yana, anuyoga and atiyoga, emphasise the completion stage and the synthesis or transcendence of the two, respectively.

== Practice ==
Reginald Ray (2002: p. 124) associates the Mahāyoga with removing aggression, or anger. An embedded quotation by Tulku Thondup identifies the focus of Mahayoga as viewing the universe as a manifestation of the Buddhist deities, a practice associated with the two truths doctrine that recognises both a conventional and an ultimate truth:

Mahāyoga-yana is associated with the masculine principle and is for those whose primary defilement is aggression. In Mahāyoga, one visualizes oneself as the divinity with consort. "All manifestation, thoughts and appearances are considered to be the sacred aspects of the divinities within relative truth," in the words of Tulku Thondup. By visualizing all phenomena as the deities of the mandala of buddhahood, in the development stage, all appearances are purified.

Ray (2002: p. 124) highlights the pre-eminent usage of visualization amongst the techniques of tantric sadhana and the teaching of the "eight cosmic commands":

One particular keynote of mahāyoga-yana has to do with the use of visualization. In the Vajrayana in general, one visualizes oneself as the buddha, thus giving external form to the enlightenment within. Like-wise, one visualizes the external world as pure and sacred, thus under-cutting the usual practice of taking things as impure and defiled. In mahāyoga, one comes to the realization that actually all of our everyday experience is a visualization. Just as we can visualize ourselves as a buddha and the world as pure, so we can visualize ourselves as an existent ego and the world as defiled. Realizing that all of our images and conceptions of reality are in fact complex visualizations, we gain a unique entry into the underpinnings of the conventional world and gain a certain kind of unparalleled leverage over it. This is reflected in the mahāyoga-yana teaching of the "eight cosmic commands," eight kinds of ways to intervene in the operation of the conventional world and alter its momentum for the benefit of others.

== Mahāyoga textual tradition ==
As with the other yanas, Mahāyoga represents both a scriptural division as well as a specific emphasis of both view (Tibetan: ta-ba) and practice (Tibetan: yod-pa). Mahāyoga scriptures are further divided into two sections: the Sadhana section, consisting of practice texts for meditation on specific deities, and the Tantra section.

In introducing the mTshams brag Edition of the Collected Tantras of the Ancients rnying ma rgyud 'bum, the textual tradition of the Mahāyoga-yana, the "Tibetan and Himalayan Library" states:

The Mahāyoga section of the Collected Tantras of the Ancients is the largest of the three. It is divided into two major sections: the Tantra Series (rgyud sde) and the Practice Series (sgrub sde). One of the seminal Tantras of the Ancients found in this section is the Secret Essence Tantra or ''gsang ba'i snying po'i rgyud'', which has spawned not only a plethora of Indo-Tibetan commentaries but also a heated debate in Tibet over its authenticity.

The "Tibetan and Himalayan Library" states that "although the mTshams brag edition of The Collected Tantras does not rigorously organize its texts according to sub-categories, the Mahāyoga category can be further subdivided according to the following scheme":

1. Tantra Series (rgyud sde)
  1. The eightfold set of root Magical Emanation Tantras (Mayajala, rtsa bar gyur sgyu 'phrul sde brgyad)
  2. The eighteenfold set of explanatory tantras (bshad pa dang cha mthun gyi rgyud tantra sde bco brgyad) (see below)
    1. Enlightened Body (sku)
    2. Enlightened Speech (gsung)
    3. Enlightened Mind (thugs)
    4. Enlightened Qualities (yon tan)
    5. Enlightened Activities (phrin las)
  3. Miscellaneous
2. Practice Series of the Eight Proclamation Deities (sgrub sde bka' brgyad)
  1. The Practice Series (sgrub sde)
    1. Summary of the Highest Intention (bla ma dgongs pa 'dus pa)
    2. Consortium of Sugatas (bde gshegs 'dus pa)
    3. Miscellaneous
  2. The Eight Proclamation Deities (bka' brgyad)
    1. The Mañjushrī Cycle on Enlightened Form ('jam dpal sku'i skor)
    2. The Lotus Tantras on Enlightened Communication (pad ma gsung gi rgyud)
    3. The Real Tantras on Enlightened Mind (yang dag thugs kyi rgyud)
    4. The Nectar Tantras on Enlightened Qualities (bdud rtsi yon tan gyi rgyud)
    5. The Sacred Dagger Cycle on Enlightened Activities (phrin las phur pa'i skor)
    6. The Cycle on Invoking the Fierce Ma-mo Deities (ma mo rbod gtong skor)
    7. Offerings and Praises to Protect the Teachings (bstan srung mchod bstod)
    8. The Cycle on Fierce Mantras (drag sngags skor)
    9. Miscellaneous
  3. Miscellaneous
3. Miscellaneous

=== Eighteen great tantras of Mahāyoga ===
The 'eighteen great tantras' (Wylie: bshad pa dang cha mthun gyi rgyud tantra sde bco brgyad) from the Tantra series described above are at the heart of the Mahāyoga tradition. These are grouped into 'five root tantras' (Wylie: rtsa ba sku gsung thugs yon tan phrin las kyi rgyud chen po lnga), 'five practice tantras' (Wylie: sgrub pa lag len du bstan pa rol pa' rgyud chen po lnga), and 'five activity tantras' (Wylie: spyod pa'i yan lag tu 'gro ba'i rgyud chen po lnga), and the 'two supplementary tantras' (Wylie: ma tshang kha bskong ba'i rgyud chen po gnyis). Together they are known as the Māyājāla. They are as follows:

The "Guhyagarbha Tantra" (Wylie: rDo rje sems dpa' sgyu 'phrul drwa ba; gSang ba snying po) is the foremost of all of these and it abridges the content of the seventeen others as follows:

==== Root tantras ====
- Equalizing Buddhahood (the tantra of the body) (Wylie: Sangs rgyas mnyam sbyor gyi rtsa ba mkha' 'gro ma bde mchog rtsa ba'i rgyud) Skt: sarva buddha sama yoga tantra rāja
- The Secret Moon, (the tantra of speech) (Wylie: dPal Zla gsang thig le rtsa ba'i rgyud) Skt: candra guhya tilaka
- The Assembly of Secrets (Guhyasamāja Tantra) (the tantra of mind) (Wylie: dPal gSang ba 'dus pa) Skt: sarva tathāgata kāya vāk citta rahasyo guhya samāja nāma mahā kalpa rāja
- The Glorious Supreme Primal Tantra (the tantra of qualities) (Wylie: dPal mchog dang po) Skt: śrī paramādya nāma mahāyāna kalpa rāja
- The Activity Garland Tantra (the tantra of activities) (Wylie: Kar ma ma le) Skt: tantra rāja mahā karma māla

==== Practice tantras ====
- The Heruka Practice Tantra (Wylie: He ru ka rol pa'i rgyud) Skt: śrī heruka tantra
- The Hayagriva Supreme Practice Tantra (Wylie: rTa mchog rol pa'i rgyud) Skt: sarva tathāgata guhya sandhi śrī aśvottama lalita sama tantra nāntra
- The Compassion Tantra (Wylie: sNying rje rol pa'i rgyud) Skt: śrī heruka karuṇā krīḍita tantra guhya gaṃbhīrottama
- The Nectar Practice Tantra (Wylie: bDud rtsi rol pa'i rgyud) Skt: mahā tantra rāja śrī amr̥ta lalita
- The Arising of the Twelve Kilayas Tantra (Wylie: Byit to ta ma rol pa'i rgyud; Phur pa bcu gnyis) Skt: kīlaya dvādaśa tantra mahāyāna sūtra

==== Activity Tantras ====
- The Mountain Pile (Wylie: Go 'phang dbang gis bgrod pa ri bo brtsegs pa'i rgyud)
- The Awesome Wisdom Lightning (Wylie: La spyod pas dor ba rngam pa glog gi 'khor lo'i rgyud)
- The Array of Samayas (Wylie: gZhi dam tshigs gis bzung ba bkod pa rgyal po'i rgyud) Skt: mahā samaya racita sarva kaṭa tantra
- The One-Pointed Samadhi (Wylie: Nyams su ting 'dzin gyis blangs pa rtse gcig bsdus pa'i rgyud) Skt: āryāvalokiteshvara samādhyeka tantra
- The Rampant Elephant (Wylie: 'Phang lta bas bcad pa glang po rab 'bog gi rgyud) Skt: hasti gajipa dama tantra

==== Last Tantras that complete whatever is incomplete ====
- The Vairochana Net of Magical Display (Wylie: rNam par snang mdzad sgyu 'phrul drwa ba'i rgyud) Skt: guhya garbha tattva niścaya
- The Noble, Skilful Lasso, the Concise Lotus Garland (Wylie: Thabs kyi zhags pa pad mo'i phreng ba'i rgyud) Skt: ārya kala pāśa padma māle saṃgraha

== Eight Herukas of the Nyingma Mahāyoga ==
The eight Herukas (Wylie: sgrub pa bka’ brgyad) of the Nyingma mahāyoga tradition (and their corresponding sadhanas) are said to have been received by Padmakara from the Eight Vidyadharas (Tib. Rigdzin), or Eight Great Acharyas: Manjushrimitra, Nagarjuna, Vajrahumkara, Vimalamitra, Prabhahasti, Dhanasamskrita, Shintamgarbha and Guhyachandra. They were proficient in the practices of, respectively,

1) Yamantaka (Tib. Jampal Shinje, ’jam dpal sku) the wrathful Manjushri, the deity of body
2) Hayagriva (Tib. Pema Sung, padma gsung) the wrathful Avalokiteshvara, the deity of speech
3) Vishuddha/Sri Samyak (Tib. Yangdak Thuk, Wylie: yang dag thugs) the wrathful Vajrapani deity of mind
4) Vajramrita (Tib. Dudtsi Yonten, bdud rtsi yon tan) the wrathful Samantabhadra, the deity of enlightened qualities
5) Vajrakilaya/Vajrakumara (Tib. Dorje Phurba, phur ba ‘phrin las), the wrathful Nivaranavishkambin, the deity of action
6) Matarah (Tib. Mamo Botong, ma mo rbod gtong) the wrathful Akasagarbha, the deity of calling and dispatching
7) Lokastotrapuja-natha (Tib. Jigten Chotod, ’jig rten mchod bstod) the wrathful Ksitigarbha, the deity of worldly offering and praise
8) Vajramantrabhiru (Tib. Mopa Dragnak, mod pa drag sngags) the wrathful Maitreya, the deity of wrathful mantras

== Diffusion ==
The Tibetan master Pelyang (dPal dbyangs) was influential in bringing Mahayoga to Tibet. He was known for his focus on view as opposed to practice - an emphasis that is later evident and upheld in the radical immediacy of experiential Dzogchen.
