= Guhyagarbha tantra =

Buddhist tantra of the Mahayoga class

The Guhyagarbha Tantra (Skt.; Tib. རྒྱུད་གསང་བ་སྙིང་པོ་, Gyü Sangwé Nyingpo; Wyl. rgyud gsang ba'i snying po, "The Tantra of the Secret Essence" or the "Secret Womb Tantra") is the most important Buddhist tantra of the Mahayoga class and the primary tantric text studied in the Nyingma tradition. It is the main Nyingma source for understanding empowerment, samaya, mantras, mandalas and other Vajrayana topics, and has influenced the Dzogchen tradition. The Nyingma scholar Longchenpa sees it as "the highest summit of all vehicles, the source of all verbal transmissions, the great great shortcut of the vehicle of all Buddhas of the three times, the most secret."

Morten Ostensen (2019) tenders that the concept of the 'buddha-nature' - specifically as 'sugata-garbha' (Wylie: bde gshegs snying po) - may first have entered the discourse of Tibet and the wider Himalaya through the translation of the Indian Sanskrit manuscript of the Guhyagarbha Tantra in the eighth century - which briefly mentions the sugata-garbha specifically - during the first dissemination or transmission period (Wylie: bstan pa snga dar) of tantra literature into the Himalaya.

== Overview ==
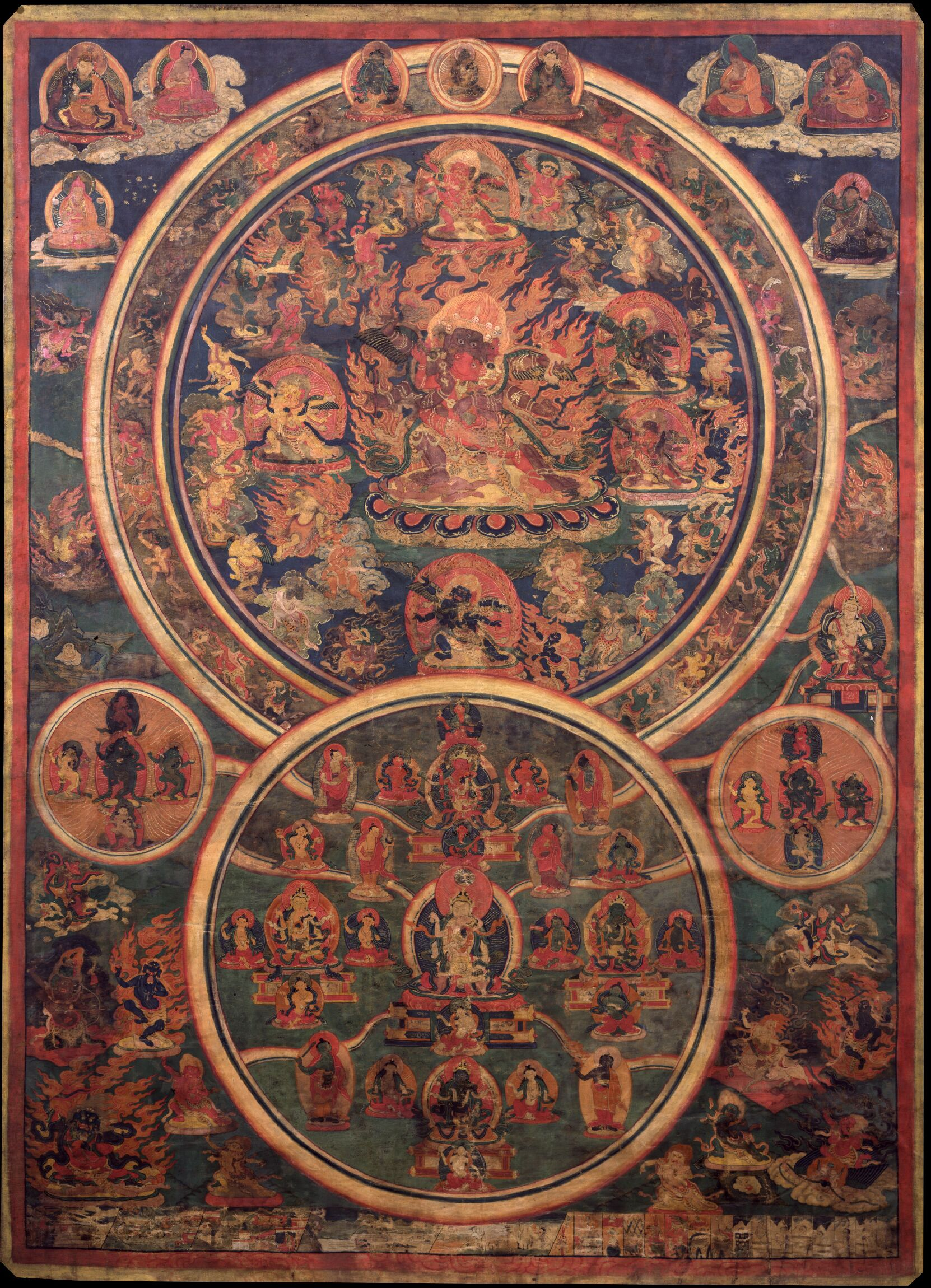
The peaceful and fierce deities.

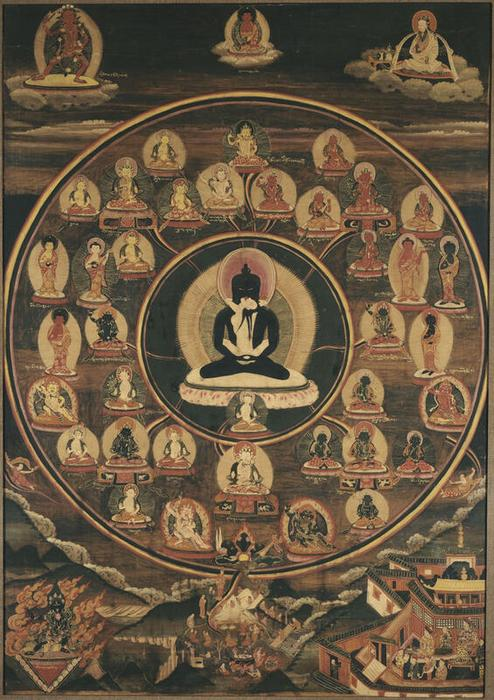
Tibetan Thanka depicting peaceful deities, 19th century, Giumet Museum. At the center is primordial Buddha Samantabhadra.

Its full title is the Glorious Web of Magical Illusion, The Secret Essence Definitive Nature Just As It Is (Tib. Pal Gyutrül Drawa Sangwé Nyingpo De Kona Nyid Ngé Pa, Wyl. dpal sgyu 'phrul drva ba gsang ba'i snying po de kho na nyid nges pa). It is also often called The Tantra of the Web of Magical Illusion (Tib. Gyutrül Drawa Gyü, Wyl. sgyu 'phrul drva ba rgyud).

The Nyingma school holds that Garab Dorje received the empowerment and transmission of the Mahayoga teachings of the Guhyagarbha from the indian Mahasiddha Kukuraja.

The Secret Womb actually refers to a collection of nineteen texts in the Tibetan canon. The main works include a short version in twenty-two chapters, an intermediate version (forty-six chapters) and a long version (eighty two chapters). These texts describe a mandala of forty-two peaceful deities and fifty-eight fierce deities. According to John Powers, its central teaching "holds that all things manifest spontaneously (thams cad rang snang), and mind and primordial wisdom also manifest spontaneously (sems dang ye shes rang snang)." The Secret Womb texts discuss numerous tantric Buddhist topics, such as the creation of mandalas, the practice of controlling the winds and drops within energy channels, the purification of the five aggregates, and the qualities and activities of the Buddhas.

Nyingma interpreters generally see the Secret Womb Tantra as a guide to the Buddhist practice of Mahayoga, also termed deity yoga, a tantric method of realizing the true nature of reality and attaining Buddhahood. This method mainly relies on the imagination to create a Buddha image in one's mind during a tantric ritual and then to merge this Buddha with oneself.

According to Gyurme Dorje:

"The iconography and symbolism of the hundred peaceful and wrathful deities presented in the Guhyagarbha Tantra subsequently gave rise to a whole genre of literature in Tibet known as the Cycles of the Peaceful and Wrathful Deities (zhi-khro)."

The Tibetan Book of the Dead (Bardo Thodol) is one such zhi-khro text.

== Commentaries ==
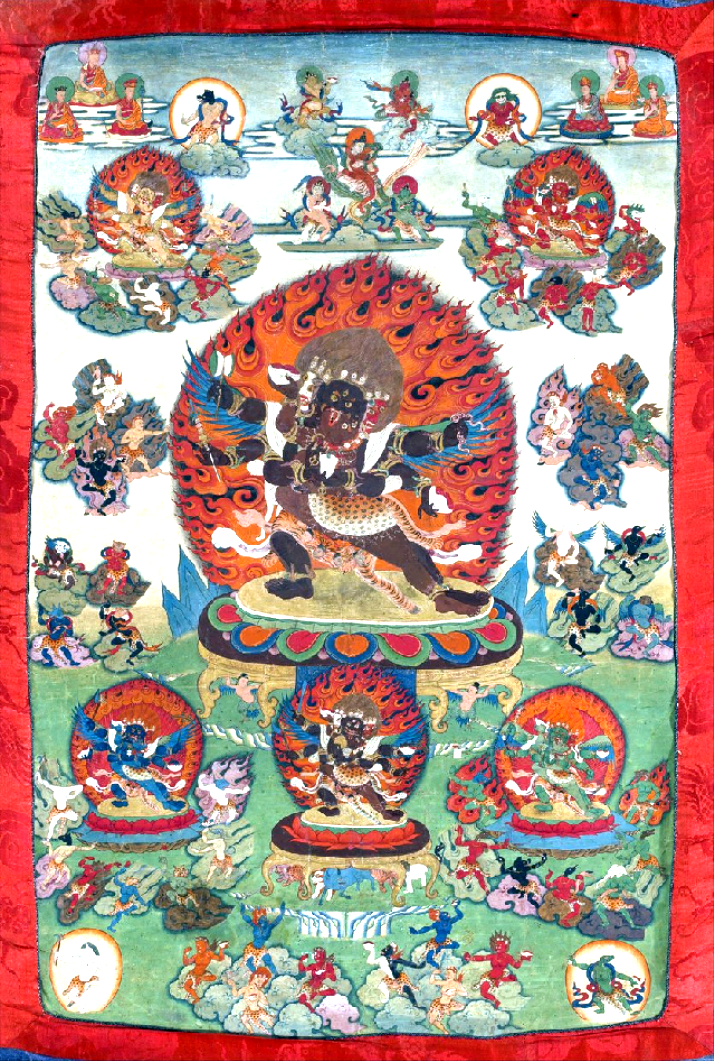
The Wrathful Deities of the Guhyagarbha Tantra. Tibetan thangka from 18th century. Middle figure is Mahottara Heruka, upper left figure is Ratna Heruka, upper right is Padma Heruka, lower center is Buddha Heruka, lower right is Karma Heruka, and lower left is Vajra Heruka. All of them have a consort. Surrounding these figures are the 58 wrathful deities.

- Vilāsavajra dpal gsang ba snying po’i ’grel pa rin po che’i spar khab slob dpon sgeg pa'i rdo rjes mdzad pa - "Blazing Palace".
- Vimalamitra (8th century)
  - rdo rje sems dpa’i sgyu ’phrul dra ba’i rgyud dpal gsang ba’i snying po shes bya ba’i spyan ’grel pa "Eye Opening" Commentary on the Secret Essence P4756
  - dpal gsang ba snying po’i don bsdus ’grel piṇḍārtha ("Ball of Meaning").
- Rongzom Pandita, Chökyi Zangpo (1012–1088) (Tibetan: རྒྱུད་རྒྱལ་གསང་བ་སྙིང་པོ་དཀོན་ཅོག་འགྲེལ, Wylie: rgyud rgyal gsang ba snying po dkon cog 'brel)
- Longchenpa (1308–1363) mun sel skor gsum - "Trilogy of Dispelling Darkness" - Three commentaries on the Guhyagarbha Tantra:
  - dpal gsang ba snying po de kho na nyid nges pa'i rgyud kyi grel ba phyogs bcu'i mun sel/ -"Dispelling Darkness in the Ten Directions" - Detailed commentary on the Guhyagarbha Tantra
  - dpal gsang ba snying po'i spyi don legs par bshad pa'i snang bas yid kyi mun pa thams cad sel ba/ - "Dispelling the Darkness of the Mind" General meaning of the Guhyagarbha Tantra
  - dpal gsang ba snying po'i rgyud kyi bsdus pa'i don ma rig mun pa thams cad sel ba/ - "Dispelling Darkness of Ignorance" - Condensed meaning of the Guhyagarbha Tantra
- Minling Lochen Dharma Shri (1654–1718) -
  - dpal gsang ba snying po de kho na nyid nges pa'i rgyud kyi 'grel ba gsang bdag dgongs rgyan/ - Textual exegesis of the Guhyagarbha Tantra
  - dpal gsang ba snying po de kho na nyid nges pa'i rgyud kyi rgyal po sgyu 'phrul drwa ba spyi don gyi sgo nas gtan la 'bebs par byed pa'i legs bshad sang bdag shal lung/ - General commentary on the Guhyagarbha tantra.
- Mipham (1846–1912) gsang 'grel phyogs bcu'i mun sel gyi spyi don 'od gsal snying po/ - An exegesis of Longchenpa's commentary on the Guhyagarbha Tantra
- Dodrup Chen III, Jigme Tenpai Nyima (1865–1926) - dpal gsang ba’i snying po’i rgyud kyi spyi don nyung ngu’i ngag gis rnam par ’byed pa rin chen mdzod kyi lde mig "Key to the Precious Treasury" - A General Commentary on the Guhyagarbha Tantra.
- Khenpo Shenga (1871–1927) - Annotated Commentary on the Guhyagarbha Tantra

== See also ==
- Eighteen great tantras
