= Phowa =

Religious practice

Phowa (Tibetan: འཕོ་བ་, Wylie: 'pho ba, Sanskrit: saṃkrānti) is a tantric practice found in both Hinduism and Buddhism. It may be described as "transference of consciousness at the time of death", "mindstream transference", "the practice of conscious dying", or "enlightenment without meditation" (Wylie: ma-sgom sangs-rgyas). In Tibetan Buddhism phowa is one of the Six yogas of Naropa and also appears in many other lineages and systems of teaching.

Lama Thubten Yeshe taught on the subject of phowa that "We have to choose the right time to transfer our consciousness; we’re not allowed to do it at the wrong time because that becomes suicide."

Outside of Buddhism "This controversial esoteric technique (Skt. utkrānti), by which a tantric practitioner is able to sever his connection to the physical body, goes by the Indian reference to 'yogic' or spiritual suicide. It is referred to in many Saiva scriptures, in one Vaisnava Samhita, and a handful of Sākta Tantras.

== Application ==
The method can be applied at the moment of death to, according to Vajrayāna Buddhist belief, transfer one's consciousness through the top of the head directly into a Buddha-field of one's choice. By so doing, one bypasses some of the typical experiences that are said to occur after death. Example destinations are Sukhāvatī, Abhirati, Ghanavyūha, Aṭakāvatī, Mount Potala, the Copper-Colored Mountain (Wylie: Zangs-mdog dpal-ri), and Tuṣita; the most popular in Chinese, Japanese and Tibetan Buddhism is Sukhavati. Phowa is also performed by specialists (Wylie: ’pho-’debs bla-ma) on the behalf of the deceased, as a post-mortem ritual.

In the context of Western Buddhism, the practice of phowa has become well known in two groups widespread in Europe and the Americas: Rigpa, which was founded by Sogyal Rinpoche in 1979; and Diamond Way Buddhism, founded in 1972 by Lama Ole Nydahl and Hannah Nydahl.

== Signs of success ==
The mark of a successful phowa practice is a small drop of blood directly from the center of the vertex at the top of the head. To demonstrate a successful practice traditionally a blade of kusha grass was pushed into the small opening created in the fontanel. According to Khenpo Tsultrim Lodrö, the “mark of a successful phowa is that after death, there is visible hair loss, a bump or some yellow liquid seeping around the vertex” at the crown of the head.

== Lineages ==
The main lineage of phowa is one of the Six yogas of Naropa, although other transmissions also exist. The chöd subsumes within its auspices aspects of phowa sadhana.

The Kagyu phowa lineage is from the Six yogas of Naropa. Nāropa received it from the Indian mahāsiddha Tilopa and later passed it to his Tibetan disciple Marpa.

Nāropa's teachings describe a second method of ’pho-ba that entails the transference of one’s consciousness to another body (Wylie: ’pho-ba grong-’jug). Milarepa's query regarding these teachings forced Marpa to search for explanatory treatises on the subject among his Indian manuscripts, and, having found none, to return to India to obtain more scriptures.

The Drikung Kagyu school of Tibetan Buddhism is known for their phowa teachings. A major pilgrimage and cultural celebration is known in the Tibetan world as the Great Drikung Phowa (Wylie: ’Bri-gung ’pho-ba chen-mo). This festival was traditionally held once in every twelve-year calendrical cycle, and its last observance took place in August 1992 in gTer-sgrom, Central Tibet, after a hiatus of 36 years due to a ban enforced by the Chinese authorities. Choeje Ayang Rinpoche from Eastern Tibet belongs to the Drikung school and is an authority on Buddhist afterlife rituals; he gives teachings and initiations to the practice of phowa annually in Bodh Gaya, India.

Some lineages of phowa include a rite of incision, or opening of the sahasrara at the cranial zenith, to assist with transferral.

According to the Vajrayana teachings, the tantric phowa method is beneficial whether the being was spiritual or not, and can be practised anonymously. The ritual will be powerful if a Buddhist shows concern for the well being of the being.

== In Dzogchen ==
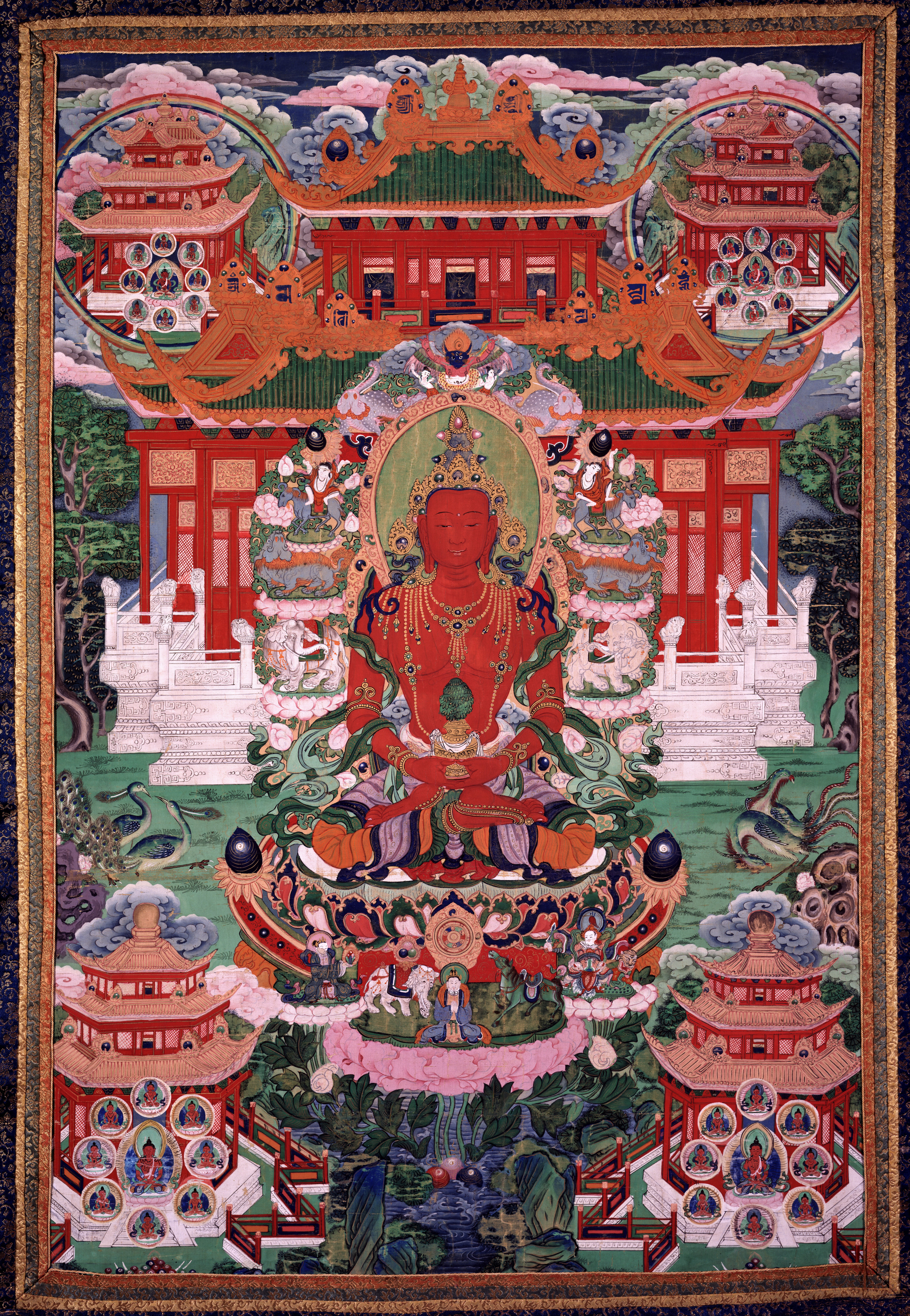
Buddha Amitayus in his Pure Land Sukhavati

Those beings of lesser faculties and limited potential will not attain awakening during the bardo but may transfer their consciousness (a practice called phowa) to a pure land once they have arrived at the "bardo of existence". Once they reach this bardo, they will recognize they have died and then they will recall the guru with faith and remember the instructions. Then they will think of the pure land and its qualities and they will be reborn there. In a pure land, beings can listen to the Dharma taught directly by Vajrasattva or some other Buddha. Jigme Lingpa recommends that one practice this in daily life as well. One way to do this is as follows:

when falling asleep at night, with intense concentration one must think: 'I am dying so I must recognize the stages of dissolution and go to the natural nirmanakaya pure realm!' Then, one will fall asleep envisioning the arrangement and qualities of the nirmanakaya realm. Between [practice] sessions, as mentioned earlier, it is essential to have developed the skill of training the consciousness that rides the winds.

Shugchang, et al., in an exegesis of the Zhitro, discuss phowa in Dzogchen:

Phowa has many different meanings; in Tibetan it means "transferring consciousness." The highest form is known as the phowa of the dharmakaya which is meditation on the great perfection. When you do Dzogchen meditation, there's no need to transfer anything, because there's nothing to transfer, no place to transfer it, nor anyone to do it. That's the highest, and greatest phowa practice.

== In early Indian yoga and tantra ==
The Sanskrit tantric text Mālinīvijayottaratantra, a non-dual Shaivistic text of the late first millennium CE includes a chapter on yogic suicide. The yogic practice may be as old at the Pātañjalayogaśāstra of Patañjali (325–425 CE), where it appears to be mentioned in sūtra 3.39.

== See also ==
- Human skull symbolism
- Mahāsamādhi
- Tibetan Pure Land Buddhism
- Tukdam
