= Rigpa (organization) =

International Buddhist organization

Rigpa is the name of an international Buddhist organization founded by Sogyal Rinpoche in 1979. It has centers and groups in 41 countries around the world. Following allegations of sexual and physical abuse in a letter by former students in 2017, Rigpa commissioned an independent investigation which found those claims to be largely substantiated, along with evidence of a cover-up. According to its website, Rigpa seeks to make the teachings of Buddha available to benefit as many people as possible, and to offer those following the Buddhist teachings a complete path of study and practice, along with the environment they need to explore the teachings to their fullest.

== History ==
After five years teaching in the West, Sogyal Rinpoche gave the name 'Rigpa' to his work. At that time, Rigpa had just one centre, in north-west London and was known as Dzogchen Orgyen Chö Ling. By 1980, Sogyal Rinpoche was teaching in the UK, France, the United States, Ireland and Holland. Rigpa centres opened in a number of major cities, and in each country Rigpa was established as a non-profit organization. A programme of Easter and summer retreats began, and Rigpa's first retreat centre, Dzogchen Beara, was set up on the west coast of Ireland.

=== Major events ===
Rigpa invited the Dalai Lama, or sponsored his teachings or empowerments, on a number of occasions; in Paris in 1982, London in 1984 and San Jose in 1989. Five and a half thousand people attended the teachings in San Jose, in what at the time was the largest gathering of practitioners and masters of Buddhadharma in America, and possibly in the West.

In 1990, Dilgo Khyentse Rinpoche taught and gave empowerments to 1,500 people at Rigpa's summer retreat near Grenoble in the French Alps. In 1992, the Dzogchen Monastery in Kollegal in India, sponsored by Rigpa, was officially inaugurated when Dzogchen Rinpoche invited the Dalai Lama to give empowerments. In the same year, Rigpa opened its main retreat centre, Lerab Ling near Montpellier in the south of France. Thich Nhat Hanh, Khenpo Jigme Phuntsok and Penor Rinpoche were among the masters who taught there in the years that followed.

In 1999, Trulshik Rinpoche founded the basis for a monastic community within Rigpa by ordaining the first nuns. In 2000 the Dalai Lama visited Lerab Ling, and gave five days of teachings entitled The Path to Enlightenment, attended by more than 10,000 students of Tibetan Buddhism from around the world. The teachings given by the Dalai Lama have been published in a book entitled Mind in Comfort and Ease: The Vision of Enlightenment in the Great Perfection.

Lerab Ling was officially recognized as a ‘religious congregation’ in 2002. In 2006, a traditional three-storey temple at Lerab Ling was completed, including a seven-metre high statue of Buddha Shakyamuni. Rigpa's first three-year retreat began, with over 300 people remaining in closed retreat at Lerab Ling from 2006 to 2009, and since 2006, over 3,000 students have followed a 'home retreat' programme in their own countries. In 2007, work began on Rigpa's Spiritual Care Centre at Dzogchen Beara.

=== The Tibetan Book of Living and Dying ===
In 1993, Sogyal Rinpoche published The Tibetan Book of Living and Dying, the success of which led to a great expansion in the work of Rigpa. A Spiritual Care Education and Training Programme was set up, and in 1996 Rigpa presented a conference on care for the dying, near Munich, which had a considerable influence on the emerging hospice movement in Germany.

=== Suspension of membership from UBF ===
Following the testimonies from current and ex-Rigpa students, of physical, sexual and financial abuse by Sogyal Rinpoche, the Union Bouddhiste De France suspended the membership of Rigpa Lérab Ling and Rigpa France on August 3, 2017.

=== Independent investigation from Lewis Silkin ===
In July 2017 a number of allegations of misconduct were brought against Rigpa's founder, Sogyal Rinpoche. One of the actions undertaken by Rigpa was to commission an independent investigation into the allegations to enable witnesses to come forward, and "be listened to in an open, impartial and sensitive way".

The report by Karen Baxter of UK law firm Lewis Silkin confirmed that, on the balance of probabilities:

- some students of Sogyal Lakar (who were part of the ‘inner circle’) have been subjected to serious physical, sexual and emotional abuse by him; and
- there were senior individuals within Rigpa who were aware of at least some of these issues and failed to address them, leaving others at risk.

Karen Baxter in her findings described one of the senior managers interviewed for the report as being "guarded, hostile and inconsistent". Another senior member of the management team was described by the lawyer as involved in "a pro-active cover-up".

The UK Charities Commission has made it very clear in recent years that they will expect organisations with safeguarding problems to launch an investigation, co-operate with the authorities and put right what they can before they are allowed to move on.

Rigpa has acknowledged the gravity of the independent report, and has committed to implementing its recommendations.

== Study and practice ==
Rigpa has developed a graduated "study and practice" program that is delivered internationally and which can take several years to complete. It begins with foundation-level courses introducing basic meditation practice, using samatha methods such as resting the mind on an object (such as the breath or a picture of Padmasambhava) and mantra recitation. Then the Mahayana teachings are presented, together with the tonglen practice of giving and receiving. Next, students are taught Vajrayana preliminaries, including "Taking Refuge" and bodhicitta (mind of awakening). Older students are taught sadhana practices focusing on the terma revelations of Sogyal Rinpoche's predecessor, Tertön Sogyal, as well as the practice of Dzogchen meditation.

Rigpa also has a program, Rigpé Yeshé, to help members who are parents and wish to educate their children as Buddhists.

=== Rigpa Shedra ===
The Rigpa Shedra, or study college, was established in 2001 in Lerab Ling. It offers courses based on traditional Buddhist texts taught by lamas such as Dzogchen Rinpoche, Dzigar Kongtrul Rinpoche, Ringu Tulku and Khenpo Pema Sherab. A longer, more intensive version known as Rigpa Shedra East, which is based in Pharping near Kathmandu and is under the guidance of Khenpo Namdrol, began in 2006. This eastern shedra runs for four months a year and the full curriculum takes nine years to complete.

== Publications and translation ==
Rigpa is well known in the Tibetan Buddhist community for its Tibetan calendar, which was first published in 1979. Other publications include View: The Rigpa Journal which began in 1994. In 2012 Rigpa's translation group published their translation of a book on lojong, To Dispel the Misery of the World, by the Sakya master Ga Rabjampa, with a foreword by Sogyal Rinpoche's former tutor, Khenpo Appey Rinpoche.
