= Dzogchen Beara =

Tibetan Buddhist retreat centre in West Cork, Ireland

Coordinates: 51°36′55.116″N 9°58′44.184″W

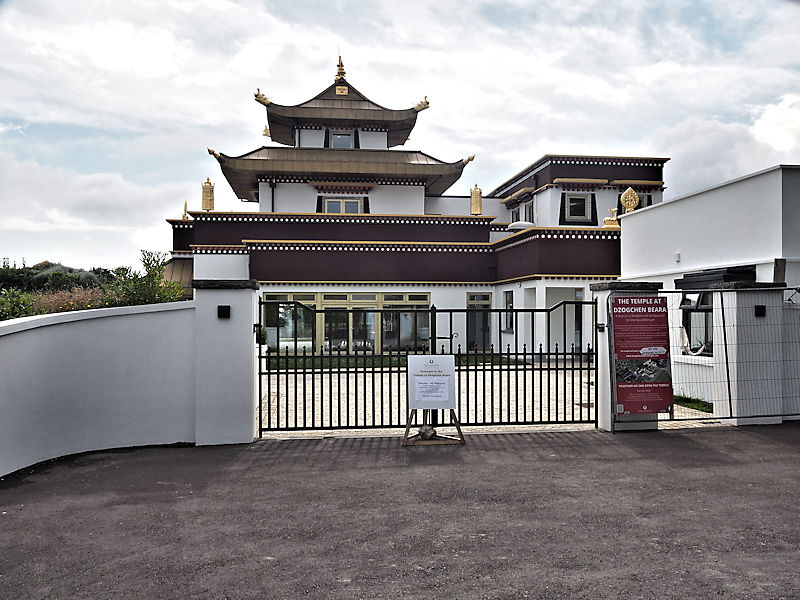

- Location in County Cork, Ireland

Religion
- Affiliation: Tibetan Buddhism
- Sect: Rigpa
- Region: West Cork (Beara Peninsula)
- Ecclesiastical or organisational status: Charitable trust/retreat centre
- Ownership: Dzogchen Beara Charitable Trust
- Governing body: Dzogchen Beara Charitable Trust
- Leadership: Centre Director: Malcolm MacClancy
- Year consecrated: 2010
- Status: Active
- Features: Temple; Spiritual Care Centre; retreat and conference facilities; meditation rooms; cottages; stupa

Location
- Location: Garranes, Allihies, Beara Peninsula, County Cork,
- Country: Ireland
- Interactive map of Dzogchen Beara

Architecture
- Style: Tibetan-style temple
- Established: 1992
- Groundbreaking: 2016
- Completed: 2024
- Construction cost: circa €3.5 million (estimated during planning)

Specifications
- Site area: approx. 150 acres originally purchased
- Temple: 1

Website
- www.dzogchenbeara.org

Dzogchen Beara is a Tibetan Buddhist retreat centre on the Beara Peninsula near Allihies in West Cork in Ireland established by Sogyal Rinpoche in 1987. It is home to the Spiritual Care Centre, which was opened by Mary McAleese on 12 September 2007.

== History ==
Peter and Harriet Cornish bought the land where Dzogchen Beara is located in 1973. In 1992, they offered the land and its buildings to a charitable trust under the guidance of Sogyal Rinpoche. Harriet Cornish died in 1993 and her death, and the way she was cared for, became the inspiration for the Spiritual Care Centre, which opened in 2007. Peter Cornish and Dzogchen Beara were the subject of a documentary made for Dutch television called The Retiring Hermit. Cornish's memoir describing the creation of Dzogchen Beara was published in 2014 under the title Dazzled by Daylight.

In 2006, the centre became the first Buddhist centre in Ireland to host a Christian Mass, performed by Father Laurence Freeman.

In 2017, following multiple allegations of physical, emotional and sexual abuse from current and ex-members of Rigpa, Sogyal Rinpoche "decided, with immediate effect, to retire as spiritual director from all the organizations that bear the name of Rigpa in different countries around the world".

== Events ==
The first closed one-year retreats, which follow a traditional Tibetan schedule of practice and study, began in 1994.

Over the years, Dzogchen Beara has hosted a number of senior lamas from the Tibetan tradition, including Dzogchen Rinpoche, Dzigar Kongtrul Rinpoche, Garchen Rinpoche, Orgyen Tobgyal, Ringu Tulku, H.E Jetsun Khandro Rinpoche and Garje Khamtrul Rinpoche. It has also hosted events with several non-Tibetan teachers, including Father Laurence Freeman, Sister Stanislaus Kennedy, Dr Tony Bates, Christine Longaker, Patrick Gaffney, Sharon Salzberg and Andrew Warr.

== Care centre ==
The Spiritual Care Centre opened in 2007. According to Darci Meyers, its aim is "to support people leading up to death, at the time of death, and after death."

== Temple project ==
Ireland's first Buddhist temple was completed and opened on 5 July 2024. The project was guided by Orgyen Tobgyal, who consecrated the site by performing a fire ceremony in 2010. Work on the foundations of the temple building began in April 2016.
