= The Tibetan Book of Living and Dying =

1992 book by Sogyal Rinpoche

- Cover of 10th Anniversary edition, 2002
- Author: Sogyal Rinpoche
- Language: English
- Subjects: Spirituality; Tibetan Buddhism
- Publisher: Rider
- Publication date: 1992
- Media type: Print
- ISBN: 0-7126-5437-2

The Tibetan Book of Living and Dying, written by Sogyal Rinpoche in 1992, is a presentation of the teachings of Tibetan Buddhism based on the Tibetan Book of the Dead or Bardo Thodol. The author wrote, "I have written The Tibetan Book of Living and Dying as the quintessence of the heart-advice of all my masters, to be a new Tibetan Book of the Dead and a Tibetan Book of Life." The book explores: the message of impermanence; evolution, karma and rebirth; the nature of mind and how to train the mind through meditation; how to follow a spiritual path in this day and age; the practice of compassion; how to care for and show love to the dying, and spiritual practices for the moment of death.

In his foreword to the book, the 14th Dalai Lama says:

In this timely book, Sogyal Rinpoche focuses on how to understand the true meaning of life, how to accept death, and how to help the dying, and the dead ... Death and dying provide a meeting point between the Tibetan Buddhist and modern scientific traditions. I believe both have a great deal to contribute to each other on the level of understanding and practical benefit. Sogyal Rinpoche is particularly well placed to facilitate this meeting; having been born and brought up in the Tibetan tradition, he has received instructions from some of our greatest Lamas. Having also benefited from a modern education and lived and worked in the West, he has become well acquainted with Western ways of thought.

== Conception and writing ==
=== Background ===
According to Daniel Goleman, Rinpoche was already planning to write a book on living and dying in the late 1970s. In 1983, he met Elisabeth Kübler-Ross, Kenneth Ring and other figures in the caring professions and near-death research, and they encouraged him to develop his work in opening up the Tibetan teachings on death and helping the dying. Rinpoche continued to teach throughout the world. Then, in 1989 in Nepal, Rinpoche met Andrew Harvey and invited him to help on the project.

=== Writing process ===
Hundreds of hours of Sogyal Rinpoche's teachings on audio-cassettes were gathered and transcribed. In 1991, Andrew Harvey and Patrick Gaffney moved into a small house in California, selected for the creative process, and close to Sogyal Rinpoche's residence. They began to draft the first chapters of the book based on Rinpoche’s oral teachings, regularly visiting Rinpoche, who would correct them and provide new ideas. More was done in London, but the most intense period of all began in Paris, at the end of 1991.

Later, while Rinpoche was leading retreats in Germany and Australia, he would send through long faxes to Gaffney and Harvey full of corrections, changes and new paragraphs. He was testing the key chapters, for example on the Nature of Mind, the practice of meditation, compassion, Guru Yoga and Dzogchen, by teaching them directly, again and again, all over the world in retreats and courses. Some parts were corrected and re-written twenty five times.

The final changes were composed in July 1992, during the three-month retreat which Rinpoche conducted at his European retreat centre, Lerab Ling, in France. Of the process, Patrick Gaffney said,

"Probably, a book has never been written in such an unusual way. If it was difficult, it was because it presented so many challenges. One of the greatest was how to find Rinpoche's voice, that intimate, warm, clear and humorous voice that is so supremely eloquent when communicating live. Rinpoche is a master of the great oral tradition of Tibet, stretching back over centuries, the hallmark of which is the power to transmit directly, from heart to heart, mind to mind, in the medium of words, something which is beyond words. There were other important issues. We implored Rinpoche to include his own personal experiences and memories from his life, which was an act of great daring for a Tibetan. Rinpoche wove in consciously, too, different layers of meaning which could be understood by people with different degrees of spiritual experience. Again, one of Rinpoche's greatest concerns was to ensure the authenticity of the teachings, and he fused into the book answers to questions about the teachings concerning death presented to His Holiness the Dalai Lama, Dilgo Khyentse Rinpoche, and other great masters."

== Publication history ==
The Tibetan Book of Living and Dying was first launched in the United States in September 1992, where it received high acclaim and spent several weeks at the top of the bestseller lists.

It was subsequently released in the United Kingdom, Australia and India, and first translated into German and French. To date, more than three million copies have been printed, in 34 languages and 80 countries. (Note: Translations: English, French, German, Chinese (Mainland China and Taiwan), Dutch, Spanish, Italian, Portuguese and Brazilian Portuguese, Japanese, Korean, Hebrew, Finnish, Turkish, Greek, Thai, Norwegian, Swedish, Danish, Croatian, Slovenian, Serbian, Hungarian, Estonian, Russian, Lithuanian, Czech, Bulgarian, Polish, Hindi, Vietnamese, Indonesian (Bahasa), Thai, Romanian, Latvian.)

The book’s success contributed to an expansion of the work of Rigpa, the network of Buddhist centres and groups set up by Sogyal Rinpoche in the 1970s.

It also prompted Rigpa to introduce a Spiritual Care Education and Training programme, providing for the needs of caregivers. A major conference held at Germering, near Munich in 1996 and involving several leading authorities on care for the dying, had a considerable influence on the emerging hospice movement in Germany.

A revised edition was released in 2002 to celebrate the book's 10th anniversary. In 2012, a new and further revised edition was published. A 25th-anniversary edition was published in 2020.

== Contents and themes ==
Divided into two main sections, the book explores:

=== Living (Part One) ===
- the message of impermanence (1. In the Mirror of Death, 2. Impermanence, 3. Reflection and Change);
- the mind and its true nature (4. The Nature of Mind);
- how to transform the mind through the practice of meditation (5. Bringing the Mind Home);
- karma (cause & effect) and re-incarnation (6. Evolution, Karma and Rebirth);
- the vision of life and death explained according to what are known as the bardos (7. Bardos and Other Realities);
- what is most important in this life along with how to work with our mind and its perceptions/projections as well as our ego (8. This Life: The Natural Bardo);
- how to follow a spiritual path and devotion (9. The Spiritual Path);
- the nature of mind according to the teachings of Dzogchen (10. The Innermost Essence)

=== Dying (Parts Two-Three) ===
- how to help someone who is dying, both practically and emotionally (11. Heart Advice on Helping the Dying)
- the practice of compassion (12. Compassion: The Wish Fulfilling Jewel);
- how to help someone who is dying, spiritually (13. Spiritual Help for the Dying, 14. The Practices for the Dying)
- the process of dying (15. The Process of Dying)
- the profound experiences that can occur at the moment of death (16. The Ground, 17. Intrinsic Radiance)
- what happens in the intermediate state after death (18. The Bardo of Becoming)
- how to help someone who has already died and the process of bereavement (19. Helping After Death)
- near-death research & scientific proof (20. The Near-Death Experience: A Staircase to Heaven)

=== Conclusion ===
- summary and interfaith comparisons (21. The Universal Process)
- a dedication and prayer (22. Servants of Peace)

== Criticism and reception ==
Donald S. Lopez, Jr. characterized the book's many references to, and quotations from, prominent figures of Classical and European history as "cosmopolitan eclecticism", saying that Sogyal Rinpoche places Tibetan wisdom "in a global and a historical spiritual lineage of thinkers that no other Tibetan author has ever cited." The religious studies scholar Huston Smith said, “I have encountered no book on the interplay of life and death that is more comprehensive, practical and wise. The perspective is forthrightly and profoundly Tibetan, but it is expounded so clearly that the reader has no trouble discerning on every page its universal import.”

The book has also received praise from a number of celebrities and public figures, who have cited it as influential in their lives. Comedian John Cleese said the book was one of the most helpful he had ever read. Musician Thom Yorke said, "It's the most extraordinary thing I've ever read" and "It felt like common sense from start to finish. I guess that's what wisdom is, really." The Spanish footballer Carles “Tarzan” Puyol is said to have taken a keen interest in Tibetan culture and Buddhism after reading The Tibetan Book of Living and Dying which helped him deal with the death of a family member.

== Influence ==
=== Health care ===
Since The Tibetan Book of Living and Dying was published, it has been adopted by institutions, centres and groups of various kinds, educational, medical and spiritual.

Sogyal Rinpoche said in his introduction to the revised edition:

"Nurses, doctors, and those professionally involved with care for the dying have told me how they have integrated these methods in their daily work, and I have heard many accounts of ordinary people using these practices and finding that they transformed the death of a close friend or relative. Something I find especially moving is that this book has been read by people with different spiritual beliefs, and they have said that it has strengthened and deepened their faith in their own tradition. They seem to recognize the universality of its message, and understand that it aims not to persuade or convert, but simply to offer the wisdom of the ancient Buddhist teachings in order to bring the maximum possible benefit."

In 1993, an international programme of education and training called, Spiritual Care, was established by Christine Longaker and others in response to requests from healthcare professionals for practical ways to bring the compassion and wisdom of teachings in The Tibetan Book of Living and Dying into their work and lives. Over the past 17 years, they have worked with hospitals, hospices and universities, and trained more than 30,000 healthcare professionals and volunteers worldwide in all areas of healthcare and social services, and supported many people facing serious illness, death, or bereavement, and their families.

== Adaptations ==
- Director Stan Lai, in his project with the Dharma Department of the National Institute of Arts, Taiwan, developed a 7-hour drama with as the starting point and central theme, a story that Rinpoche told in the book about "Patient Five", a woman who tells the story of her life as she faces imminent death.
- Australian composer Nigel Westlake's son was murdered just before the age of 21. Filled with grief he said, "When we lost Eli, I found myself obsessing about where he was and what we could do to help him. ... I found great consolation in the Buddhist teachings of The Tibetan Book of Living and Dying." When he could begin composing again, he started writing a requiem for his son. The text of the third movement, "The Hymn of Compassion", contains excerpts of The Tibetan Book of Living and Dying.

== Related publications ==
- Chapter Five of The Tibetan Book of Living and Dying, which gives a detailed presentation of meditation, was published separately by Harper Collins under the title Meditation, ISBN 0-06-251114-9
- Extracts from The Tibetan Book of Living and Dying were also published as Glimpse After Glimpse: Daily Reflections for Living and Dying, ISBN 0-06-251126-2
