= Patrick Gaffney (Buddhist) =

British Buddhist teacher

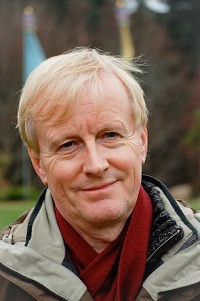

Personal life
- Education: Cambridge University
- Occupation: translator, and teacher

Religious life
- Religion: Tibetan Buddhism
- School: Nyingma; Dzogchen

Senior posting
- Teacher: Sogyal Rinpoche

Patrick John Gaffney (born 6 February 1949) is an English author, editor, translator, and teacher of Tibetan Buddhism who studied at the University of Cambridge. He was one of the main directors and teachers of Rigpa—the international network of Buddhist centres and groups founded by Sogyal Rinpoche. As of April 2019, Gaffney has been disqualified by the UK Charity Commission from acting as a trustee in all charities for a period of 8 years.

== Writing and editing ==
Together with Andrew Harvey, Gaffney was the co-editor of Sogyal Rinpoche's book The Tibetan Book of Living and Dying. He has also edited two of the Dalai Lama's books, Dzogchen: The Heart Essence of the Great Perfection and Mind in Comfort and Ease: The Vision of Enlightenment in the Great Perfection.

== Translation ==
Also a written translator of teachings from Tibetan into English, he translated the Bodhichitta chapter of A Guide to the Words of My Perfect Teacher by Khenpo Ngawang Pelzang under the auspices of the Dipamkara and Padmakara Translation Groups. He is also the senior editor of the Rigpa Translation group.

== Teaching ==
Gaffney teaches regularly at retreats and public events in Rigpa centres around the world and assisted Sogyal Rinpoche in guiding students during the three-year retreat at Rigpa's main international retreat centre, Lerab Ling, in France, which concluded in November 2009. As a teacher, he mainly focuses on compassion and bodhichitta. He is considered the senior-most teacher amongst Sogyal Rinpoche's students. Regarding Gaffney, Rinpoche has said: “He is one of my oldest and closest students; and if anyone were to understand my mind or my work, it is him.”

He is also an adviser on a number of Rigpa's major international projects such as the Tenzin Gyatso Institute of which he is the President and chairperson. He was a speaker at the Empathy and Compassion in Society conference held in London in November 2012.

== Disqualification ==
Following an independent report into sexual abuse in Rigpa, the Charity Commission for England and Wales conducted their own investigation and issued a statement in June 2019 that included

Evidence uncovered by the Commission shows Mr Gaffney had knowledge of instances and allegations of improper acts and sexual and physical abuse against students at the charity. Mr Gaffney failed to take appropriate action in response to this information and is therefore responsible for misconduct and/or mismanagement in the administration of the charity.

== Bibliography ==
- The Tibetan Book of Living and Dying: A New Spiritual Classic from One of the Foremost Interpreters of Tibetan Buddhism to the West (co-editor), 1992
