= Ayang Rinpoche =

Buddhist Leader

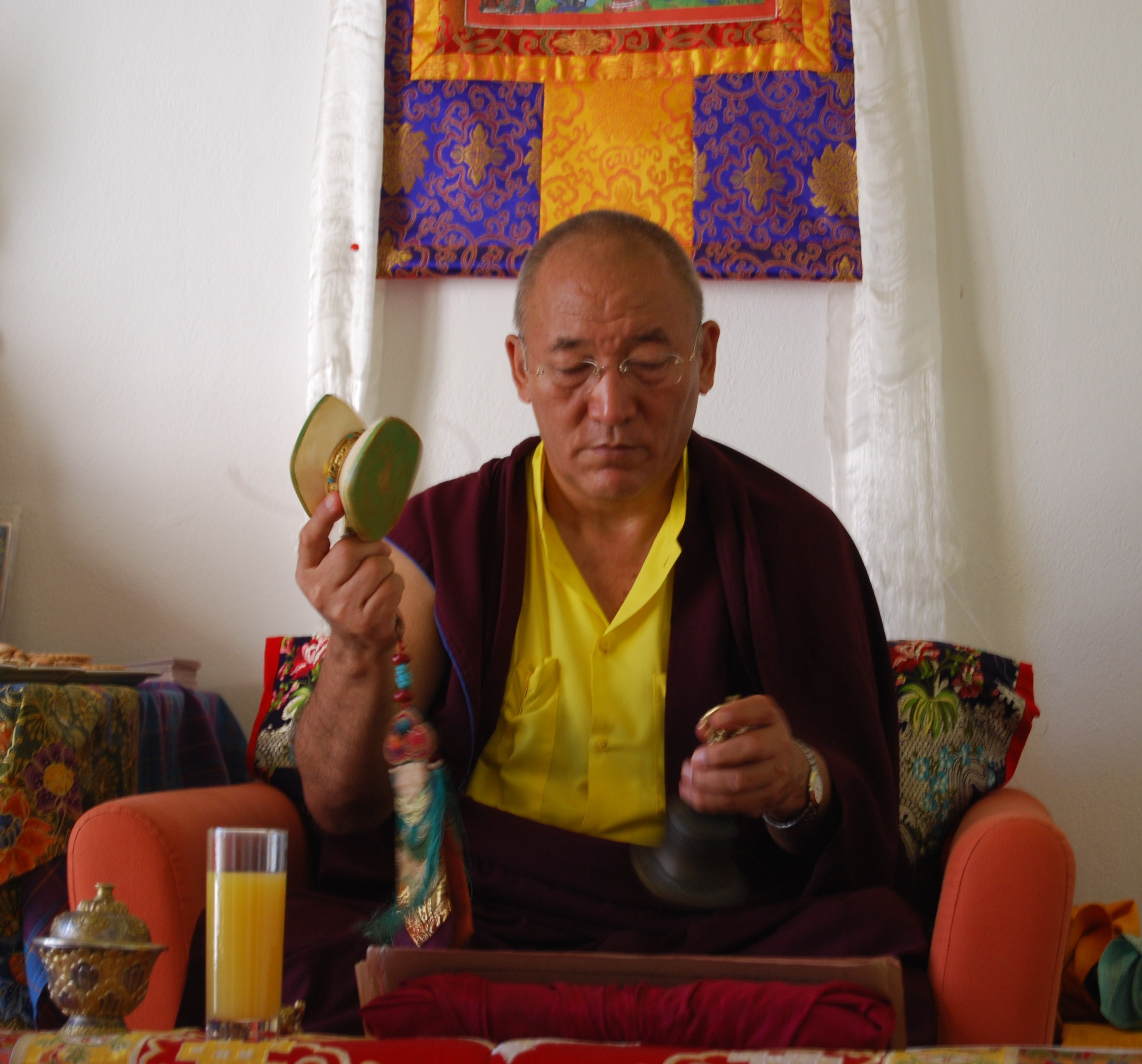
Ayang Rinpoche

H. E. Chöje Ayang Tulku Rinpoche was a Tibetan Buddhist lama known for both his charitable work and his extensive academic work especially in relation to bardo and pure land.

== Life ==
H. E. (His Eminence) Chöje Ayang Tulku Rinpoche (born 1942) was born in a nomadic family in Eastern Tibet. Ven. Ayang Rinpoche died in Mysuru, Karnataka, India on December 4th 2024.

He held both Drikung Kagyu and Nyingma lineages. The young boy was recognised by a delegation of high lamas, including the 16th Gyalwang Karmapa, Ayang Drubchen Tenpai Nyinpa, Nelong Drubchen, Traleg Kyagbon, and the tutor of Drikung Kyobgon Chabra Rinpoche, as the mind (wisdom) emanation of Terton Rigzin Chögyal Dorje and the seventh incarnation of the founder of the Ayang Monastery in Eastern Tibet (Kham), which was built around 1580 C.E. as a branch of the main Drikung monastery. He took his monk's vows and received his early training at Drikung Thil Changchub Ling, the main Drikung Kagyu monastery in central Tibet. From 1951 to 1955 he studied at Drikung Nyima Changra Philosophical College in central Tibet. From Khenpo Tsense Sangpo he received all the Nyingthig initiations and teachings as well as his first Phowa teaching according to the Nyingma tradition. From the great Drikung lama Nyizong Tripa he received all the initiations of Rinchen Ter Dzod and Kagyu Nag Dzod. From his own monastery, Ayang Thupten Rinpoche, who was also the tutor of the head of the Drikung lineage, bestowed on him teachings of the Six Yogas of Naropa and Mahamudra. He received teachings on Drikung Phowa from both Drikung Kyobgon Chetsang Rinpoche and Drikung Kyobgon Chungsang Rinpoche, the heads of the Drikung lineage, during the Phowa Chenmo, which takes place only once every twelve years. He was given the Upadesha (pointing out instructions) by the great Nyingma yogi Rahor Chödra Rinpoche.

== Work ==
Ayang Rinpoche was considered a foremost authority on Buddhist afterlife rituals and Tibetan Pure Land Buddhism; he gave teachings and initiations to the practice of phowa in Tibetan and English annually in Bodh Gaya, India and across the world in Europe, Asia, Australia and North America. He established a school, medical clinic and education sponsorship program for children in Tibet and a variety of community development projects for Tibetans in India. He was also the founder of the Opame Khilkor Choling (The Amitabha Mandala Temple and Retreat Center) with 16 temples and a 64-cottage retreat center dedicated to Buddha Amitābha that overlooks the Kathmandu Valley in Nepal and Thupten Shedrub Jangchub Ling Monastic Institute at Bylakuppe, in the Indian State of Karnataka.

== Vajrayana courses ==
Chöje Ayang Rinpoche gave teachings around the world, at locations like Hong Kong, Paris, San Jose, Sydney, Taipei, Toronto, etc. Besides his famous Phowa courses, he also lectured on advanced Vajrayana courses like, but not limited to, higher level Buddha Vajrasattva teachings (wisdom treasure of Rigdzin Tsewang Norbu), Buddha Amitābha 10 levels teachings (Namchö tradition), and true nature of mind “pointing out” instructions.

Phowa Teachings Contents:

- Buddha Amitābha empowerment
- Nyingma phowa oral transmission, instructions and practice
- Drikung phowa oral transmission, instructions and practice
- Vajrasattva visualization and practice
- Buddha Amitābha Visualization
- Namcho Amitābha short sadhana practice
- Three excellence teachings
- Doing phowa for others at the moment of death
- Doing phowa for oneself at the moment of death
- Milarepa tsog offering prayers
- Amitābha tsog offering prayers
