= The Son of Man (book) =

1998 book by Andrew Harvey

The Son of Man: The Mystical Path to Christ
- Title page for The Son of Man: The Mystical Path to Christ (1998)
- Author: Andrew Harvey
- Language: English
- Genre: Non-fiction
- Publication date: 1998
- Publication place: United Kingdom

The Son of Man: The Mystical Path to Christ is a nonfiction book by British author Andrew Harvey, published in 1998.
