= Nyoshul Khenpo Rinpoche =

Tibetan lama

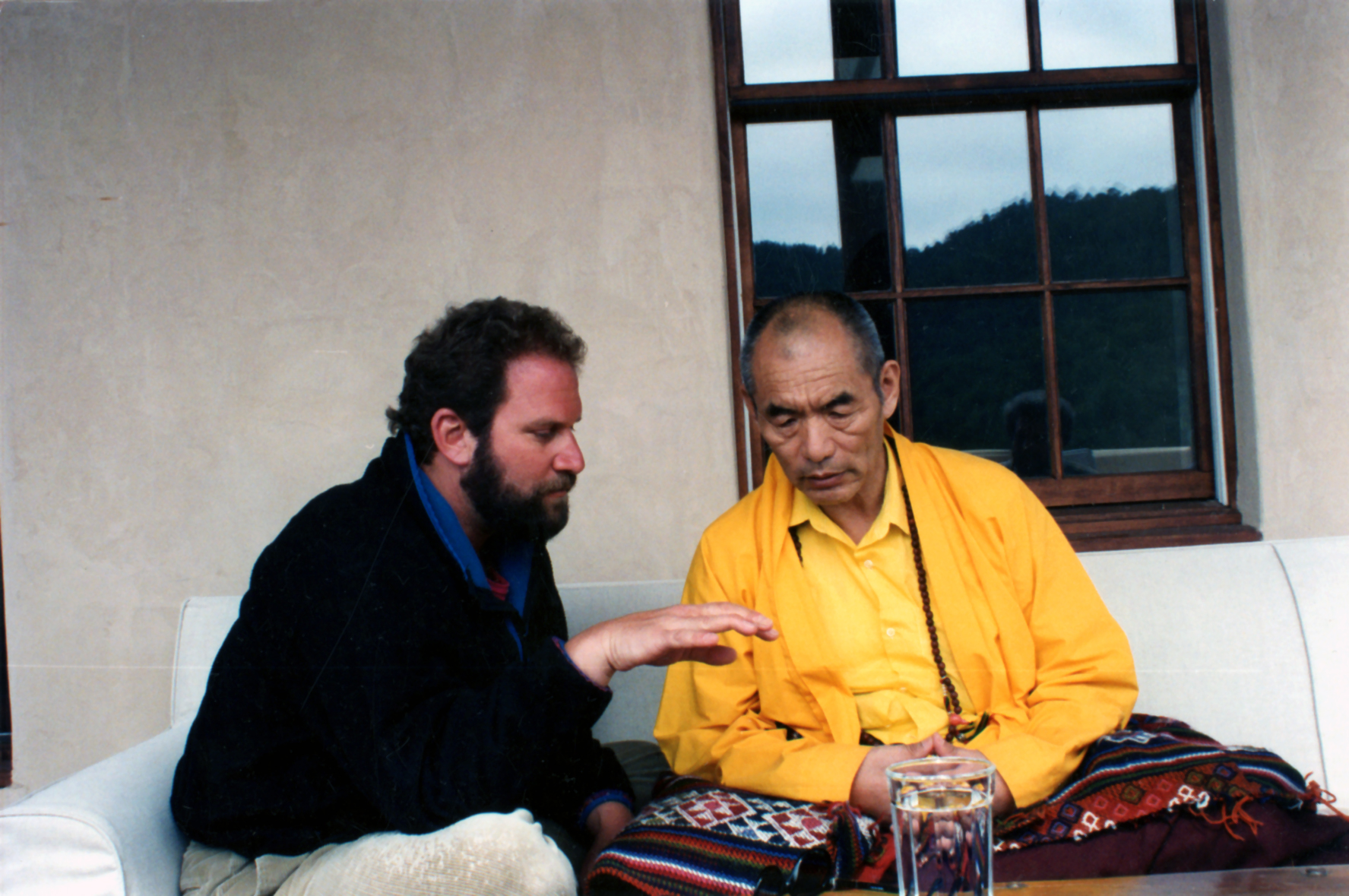
- Pictured is Lama Surya Das (left) and Nyoshul Khenpo Rinpoche (right)
- Title: Khenpo

Personal life
- Born: 13 July 1932 Dergé region of Kham
- Died: 27 August 1999 (aged 67)
- Other name: Nyoshul Khen Rinpoche

Religious life
- Religion: Buddhism
- School: Nyingma
- Dharma name: Nyoshul Jamyang Dorje

Senior posting
- Teacher: Jigdral Yeshe Dorje, 2nd Dudjom Rinpoche, Dilgo Khyentse, Rangjung Rigpe Dorje, 16th Karmapa
- Students: Surya Das, Yongey Mingyur Rinpoche, Sogyal Rinpoche

Nyoshül Khenpo Rinpoche (13 July 1932 – 27 August 1999), more fully Nyoshül Khenpo Jamyang Dorje (Tibetan: སྨྱོ་ཤུལ་མཁན་པོ་འཇམ་དབྱངས་རྡོ་རྗེ་, Wylie: smyo shul mkhan po 'jam dbyangs rdo rje), was a Tibetan lama born in the Derge region of Kham.

== Biography ==
Nyoshul Khenpo Rinpoche was born in 1932 in the Derge region of Kham, Tibet. At the age of five, Rinpoche was taken to a Sakya monastery where he had his hair cut and was given a refuge name. At age eight, he was enrolled in the monastery and began his Buddhist studies. At age eighteen, he studied Longchen Nyingthig teachings and Dzogchen at the Nyoshul monastery. At the time of 1959 Tibetan uprising, when he was twenty-seven, under fire from the Chinese, he fled to India with 70 people, but only 5 arrived.

In India, Rinpoche studied under the second Dudjom Rinpoche (Jigdral Yeshe Dorje), Dilgo Khyentse Rinpoche, and the sixteenth Karmapa (Rangjung Rigpe Dorje).

He was asked to teach by the leaders of the religious communities in exile, including the aforementioned Rinpoches, and Tashi Peljor and the Third Penor, Lekshe Chokyi Drayang. It is said that there are few contemporary lamas who did not receive Dzogchen teaching from Nyoshul Khenpo. Among the many young lamas that he mentored and instructed are the Third Dzongsar Khyentse, Khyentse Norbu; the Seventh Shechen Rabjam, Jigme Chokyi Sengge; the Third Jamgon Kongtrul, Lodro Chokyi Sengge, and many others.

Some of Rinpoche's other students include Surya Das and Sogyal Rinpoche.

He fell seriously ill in 1999 in Bhutan. His followers insisted that he be taken to one of the best hospitals in Bangkok and then to France, where he was cared for by the family of Tulku Pema Wangyel, the son of Kangyur Rinpoche. He died there in 1999, close to Dilgo Khyentse and Dudjom Rinpoche's centers in Dordogne.

After Rinpoche's passing, the fifth Kathok Drimed Zhingchong, Jigme Trinley Gonpo and the second Khenpo Ngakchung Lekshey Chökyi Nyima had numerous dreams and visions that clearly indicated of a reincarnation. In 2004 the reincarnation of Nyoshul Khenpo was identified in Kham, Nyoshul Khen yangsi jamyang Dzhopa, who was subsequently enthroned at Katok Monastery.

== Bibliography ==
- Natural Great Perfection. With Surya Das (1st USA ed.). Snow Lion Publications. 1995. ISBN 1-55939-049-2.
- A Marvelous Garland of Rare Gems: Biographies of Masters of Awareness in the Dzogchen Lineage. Padma Publishing. 2005. ISBN 1-881847-41-1.
- The Fearless Lion's Roar. Snow Lion Publications. 2015. ISBN 978-1-55939-431-4.
