= Christine Longaker =

Christine Longaker is the former director of the Hospice of Santa Cruz County (California) and is considered a pioneer in the hospice movement. She has provided trainings in caring for the dying around the world since 1978. She co-designed Naropa University’s accredited training in "Contemplative End-of-Life Care", and is the author of Facing Death and Finding Hope: A Guide to the Emotional and Spiritual Care of the Dying, which has been translated into nine languages, and is used in palliative and hospice care centers around the world. Longaker is currently writing a book and creating a curriculum on Self-Compassion.

== Biography ==
Longaker was born and raised in Southern California. Soon after her first husband died in 1977, she helped to found a home-care hospice in Santa Cruz, and served as Staff Trainer and Director. She taught courses on "Death and Dying" at Cabrillo College in Santa Cruz and has a lifetime teaching credential for California Private Post Secondary Educational Institutions in Asian Studies and Death and Dying. In 1980 she met Sogyal Rinpoche in California and became his student, and founded Rigpa Fellowship in America, serving as its director for eight years. In 1993 she helped establish the international Spiritual Care program, offering professional trainings in spiritual care and compassionate care for the dying. Serving as International Education Director for twenty years, she taught teams of trainers in nine countries, who together brought the vision of compassionate care for the dying and bereaved to over 30,000 people. Longaker's trainings have inspired the development of four hospice programs in Germany, France, and Switzerland, and two spiritual care centers: The Care Center at Dzogchen Beara Meditation Centre in Ireland, and Sukhavathi in Germany.

Longaker co-authored and was core faculty for a pioneering nine-month training, with residential and online modules, titled "Contemplative End of Life Care", initially hosted and accredited by Naropa University in Boulder, Colorado. In 2005, with German palliative care expert Dr. Gian Domenico Borasio, she published a research article on the effects of spiritual care training for palliative care professionals, which described sustained benefits six months after the medical professionals received a training in self-care and spiritual care.

Since 1978, Longaker has given in-service trainings, grand rounds talks for doctors, and keynote addresses at conferences related to compassion and hospice and palliative care in the US, Australia, and Europe. In April 2009 she gave the opening address at the International Spiritual Care Conference "Compassion and Presence: Spiritual Care for the Living and Dying" in Killarney, Ireland. She made keynote presentations at the following conferences: 2013, France, Compassion in Medicine Forum: "Cultivating Compassionate presence for oneself". 2012, London, Empathy and Compassion in Society, "The Benefits of Integrating Compassion and Presence in Health Care". 2005, Boulder, Colorado, Contemplative End of Life Care, keynote talk: "Wisdom and Compassion in Caregiving". 2002, National Palliative Care Congress, Munich, Germany. 1998, Seattle, "Parting Visions Conference". 1997 & 1995, New York, "The Art of Dying" conference, Open Center and Tibet House. 1994, Chicago, "New Dimensions of Death and Dying", Institute of Noetic Sciences.

== Bibliography ==
=== Books ===
- Facing Death and Finding Hope: A Guide to the Emotional and Spiritual Care of the Dying, Arrow Books, 1998, ISBN 0-09-917692-0

=== Articles and chapters ===
- Maria Wasner, Christine Longaker, Martin Johannes Fegg and Gian Domenico Borasio, "Effects of spiritual care training for palliative care professionals" in Palliative Medicine 2005 19, pages 99–104
- "Listening with Presence, Awareness, and Love" in "The Wisdom of Listening," Mark Brady (ed.). ISBN 0861713559
- "Transforming Suffering Through Compassion" in Losing the Clouds, Gaining the Sky, Doris Wolter (ed.) Boston: Wisdom Publications, 2007. ISBN 9780861713592
- "Sparking the Inner Flame", in Devotion: Following Tibetan Masters, Sherry Marshall (ed.), Sydney: Simon & Schuster, 1999. ISBN 0 7318 0767 7
- Documentary Zorg et Compassie (Care and Compassion) by Jurgen Gudde for BOS, the Netherlands.
