= Buddha Is as Buddha Does =

2008 book by Surya Das

Buddha Is as Buddha Does: The Ten Original Practices for Enlightened Living
- Author: Surya Das
- Language: English
- Subject: Religion, spirituality
- Publisher: HarperCollins
- Publication date: February 26, 2008
- Media type: Print, hardcover and paperback
- Pages: 288 pp (paperback)
- ISBN: 978-0-06-085953-4

Buddha Is as Buddha Does: The Ten Original Practices for Enlightened Living is a book written by Surya Das, published in 2008. It is conceived as a guide for spiritual development based on the pāramitās, traditional Buddhist teachings. The Sanskrit term is usually translated as "perfections", but the practices are best understood as a set of virtuous actions. Surya Das explains each of the ten virtues, offering various exercises and tips to apply the teaching. This is accompanied by anecdotes, traditional stories and the examples of historical figures in Buddhism. Surya Das also offers examples of Westerners who embody these virtues, from the Catholic saint Damien, who worked with lepers on the Hawaiian island of Molokai, to Oprah Winfrey, a model of shrewd and skillful action.
