= Surya Das =

American lama in the Tibetan Buddhist tradition

Lama Surya Das
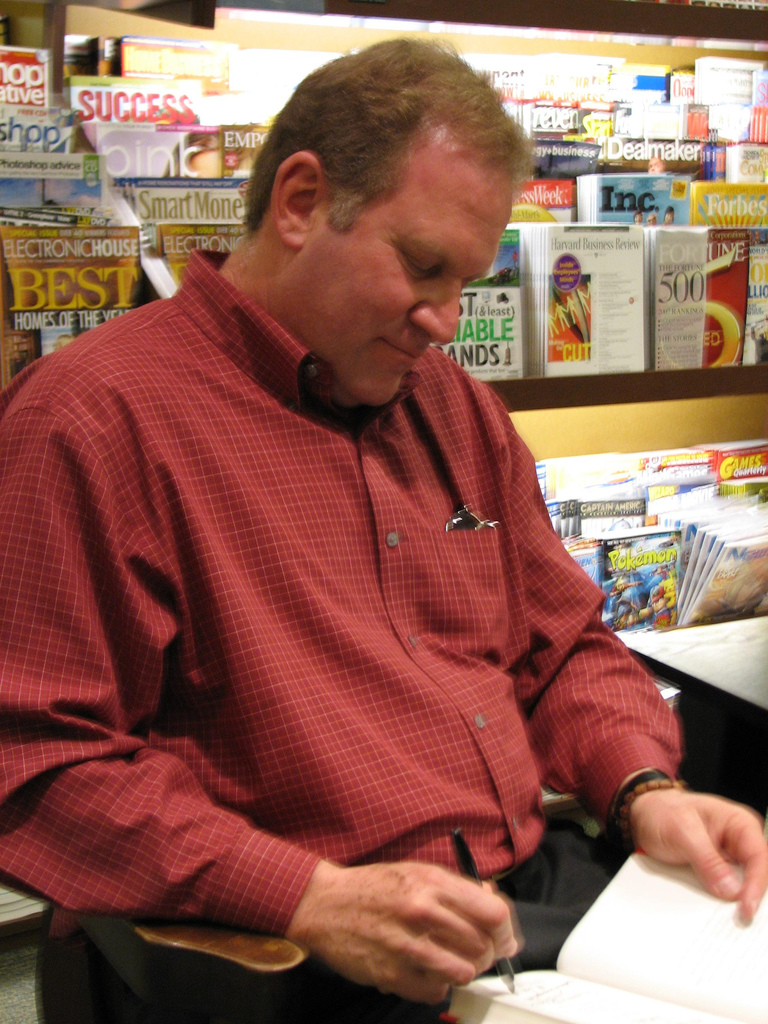
- Title: Lama Surya Das

Personal life
- Born: Jeffrey Miller; 1950 (age 75–76) New York City, United States
- Occupation: Religious educator
- Website: surya.org

Religious life
- Religion: Buddhism
- School: Nyingma, Kagyu, Rimé

Surya Das (born Jeffrey Miller in 1950) is an American lama in the Tibetan Buddhist tradition. He is a poet, spiritual activist, author of many popular works on Buddhism, meditation teacher, and spokesperson for Buddhism in the West.

Surya Das is a Dharma heir of Nyoshul Khenpo Rinpoche, a Nyingma master of the non-sectarian Rime movement, with whom he founded the Dzogchen Foundation and Center in 1991. He received Nyoshul Khenpo's authorization to teach in 1993.

His name, which means "Servant of the Sun" in a combination of Sanskrit (sūrya) and Hindi (das, from the Sanskrit dāsa), was given to him in 1972 by the Hindu guru Neem Karoli Baba. Surya Das is based in Cambridge, Massachusetts.

== Early life and education ==
Surya Das was born Jeffrey Miller and raised in Valley Stream, Long Island, New York. He attended the State University of New York at Buffalo, graduating with honors in 1971, with a degree in creative education.

=== Early studies ===
After his best friend's girlfriend, Allison Krause, was killed during the Kent State shootings, Surya Das began pursuing spirituality. From 1971 to 1976 he traveled in India. There he studied Hinduism with Neem Karoli Baba as well as Vipassana with S. N. Goenka and Anagarika Munindra, of the Theravadin tradition. Neem Karoli Baba gave him the name Surya Das in 1972.

During his travels in India and Nepal, Surya Das studied with Tibetan Buddhist Lamas Thubten Yeshe, Kalu Rinpoche, The 16th Gyalwa Karmapa, Tulku Urgyen, Thrangu Rinpoche, Dezhung Rinpoche, Dilgo Khyentse, and Kangyur Rinpoche. In 1973 and 1974, he lived in Kyoto, Japan, where he taught English and studied Zen Buddhism with Uchiyama Roshi.

=== Monastery and retreat ===
In 1977, Surya Das helped establish Gyalwa Karmapa's Karma Triyana Dharmachakra monastery on a mountaintop overlooking Woodstock, New York. He resided at the monastery from 1977 to 1980. He attended the first Nyingmapa retreat center in Dordogne, France in 1980. At the center he completed two Dzogchen retreats under the guidance of Dudjom Rinpoche and Dilgo Khyentse Rinpoche.

== Teaching career ==
=== Founding of the Dzogchen Foundation ===
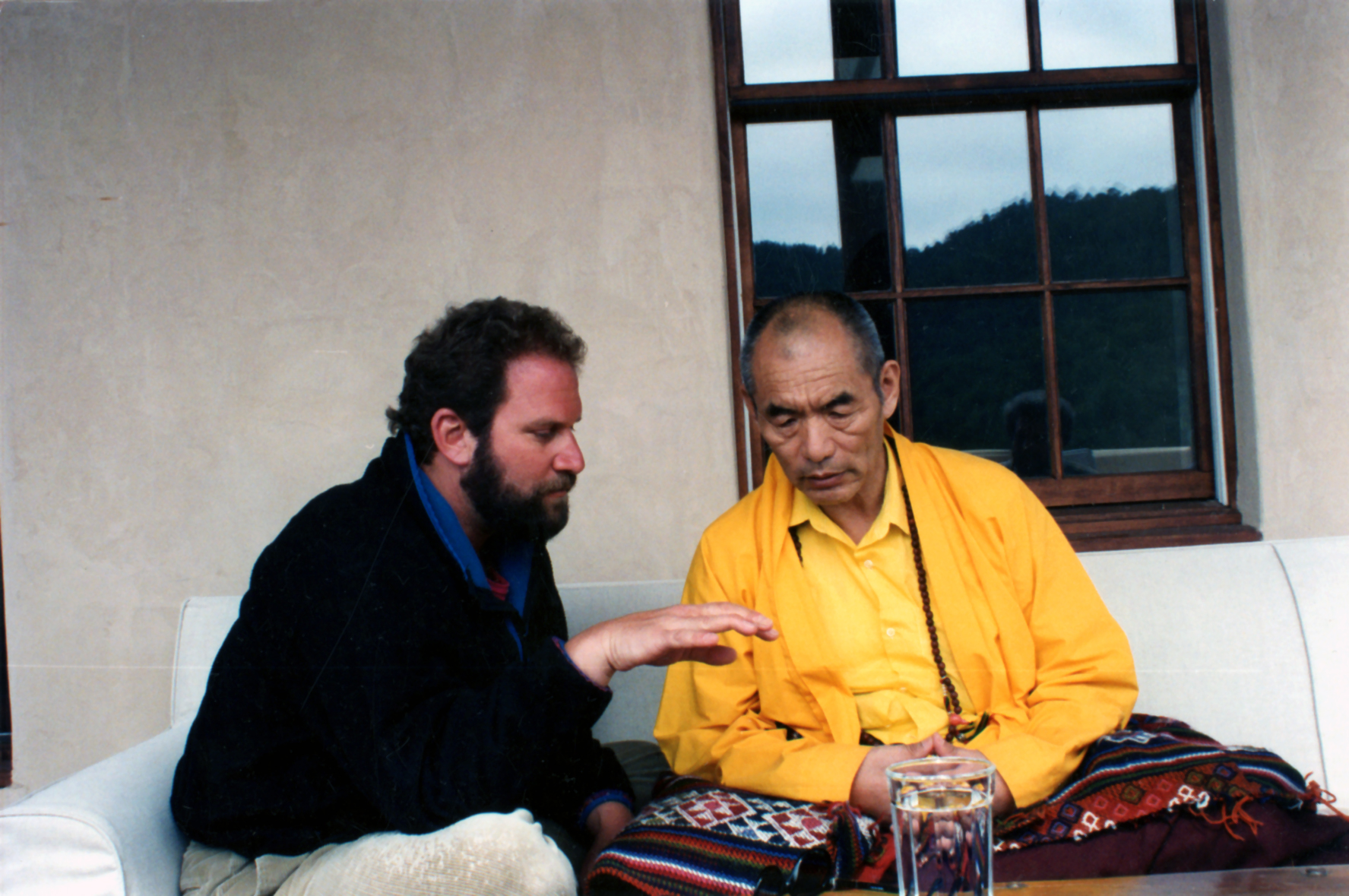
Pictured is Lama Surya Das (left) and Nyoshul Khenpo Rinpoche (right)

In 1991, Surya Das returned from his two decades at Tibetan monasteries and retreats, and with Nyoshul Khenpo established the Dzogchen Foundation and Center to help further the spread of Tibetan Buddhism in the West. He received Nyoshul Khenpo's authorization to teach in 1993. The Foundation has brought many Tibetan lamas to teach in the United States.

From the 1990s to the 2010s, Surya Das taught meditation retreats, workshops, and Buddhist philosophy internationally. He has taught at the Omega Institute, Esalen Institute, the Open Center, Notre Dame Retreat House, Saint Stephen Priory, Garrison Institute, and NYC Tibet House.

Das also founded the Western Buddhist Teachers Network and helped organize conferences of Western Buddhist teachers with the 14th Dalai Lama in Dharamshala, India.

=== Appearances ===
Surya Das travels, teaches, and leads meditation retreats throughout the world. He is called as a Buddhist spokesman by the media and has appeared on TV and radio. One episode of the sitcom Dharma and Greg, "Leonard's Return", was loosely based on his life and return to America. He appeared twice as a special guest on the Comedy Central television show The Colbert Report, in 2006 and 2008.

== Misconduct allegations ==
Five women brought allegations of sexual misconduct by Surya Das to Dzogchen Foundation's board of directors. Three of them said Surya Das suggested meditating while naked in his lap (based on the yab-yum image). Two others recounted sexual encounters with Das, including one who said that he told her having sex with him would complete her training. Surya Das has disputed some details of these allegations. In 2020, Surya Das told a reporter that he had had sex with "probably one or two" of his students. Later, in a statement, he said that he had relationships with "a few" of his former students before 2010. New ethical guidelines were established as a result.

== Bibliography ==
=== Books ===
- Surya Das, Lama (1992). The Snow Lion's Turquoise Mane. San Francisco: HarperSanFrancisco. ISBN 0-06-250849-0.
- Nyoshul Khenpo; Surya Das, Lama (1995). Natural Great Perfection (1st US ed.). United States: Snow Lion Publications. ISBN 1-55939-049-2.
- Surya Das, Lama (1997). Awakening the Buddha Within: Eight Steps to Enlightenment: Tibetan Wisdom for the Western World. United States: Bantam. ISBN 0-5535-0537-8.
- Surya Das, Lama (2000). Awakening to the Sacred: Creating a Personal Spiritual Life. United States: Harmony. ISBN 0-7679-0275-0.
- Surya Das, Lama (2001). Awakening the Buddhist Heart: Integrating Love, Meaning and Connection into Every Part of Your Life. United States: Broadway Books. ISBN 0-7679-0277-7.
- Surya Das, Lama (2003). Letting Go of the Person You Used To Be: Lessons on Change, Loss, and Spiritual Transformation (1st ed.). United States: Broadway Books. ISBN 0-7679-0873-2.
- Surya Das, Lama (2005). Natural Radiance: Awakening to Your Great Perfection (Book & CD ed.). United States: Sounds True. ISBN 1-59179-283-5.
- Surya Das, Lama (2007). The Big Questions: How to Find Your Own Answers to Life's Essential Mysteries. United States: Rodale Books. ISBN 978-1-59486-208-3.
- Surya Das, Lama (2008a). Buddha Is as Buddha Does: The Ten Original Practices for Enlightened Living. United States: HarperOne. ISBN 978-0-06-085953-4.
- Surya Das, Lama (2008b). Words of Wisdom. United States: Koa Books. ISBN 978-0-9773338-7-5.
- Surya Das, Lama (2009). The Mind Is Mightier Than the Sword: Enlightening the Mind, Opening the Heart. United States: Doubleday Religion. ISBN 978-0-7679-1864-0.
- Surya Das, Lama (2011). Buddha Standard Time: Awakening to the Infinite Possibilities of Now. United Kingdom: HarperCollins. ISBN 978-0-06-177456-0.
- Surya Das, Lama (2015). Make Me One with Everything: Buddhist Meditations to Awaken from the Illusion of Separation. United States: Sounds True. ISBN 978-1622034123.
- Surya Das, Lama (2019). The Yeti & the Jolly Lama. United States. ISBN 1683643860.

=== Articles ===
- Surya Das, Lama (April 7, 2014). "My First Encounter With the Sixteenth Karmapa". The Huffington Post.

=== Audio/Visual ===
Surya Das hosts the podcast "Awakening Now with Lama Surya Das" on the Be Here Now network.

- Surya Das, Lama (December 6, 2016). Lama Surya Das – Ep. 35 – Dilgo Khyentse Rinpoche (audio). Be Here Now Network.
