= Andrew Harvey (religious writer) =

British author, religious scholar, and teacher of mystic traditions

- Born: 1952 (age 73–74); Coimbatore, India
- Citizenship: British
- Education: University of Oxford
- Occupations: Author, religious scholar, mystic
- Writing career
- Language: English and French
- Period: 1970–1977
- Website: andrewharvey.net

Andrew Harvey (born 9 June 1952) is a British author, religious scholar and teacher of mystic traditions, known primarily for his popular nonfiction books on spiritual or mystical themes, beginning with his 1983 A Journey in Ladakh. He is the author of over 30 books, including, The Hope, A Guide to Sacred Activism, The Direct Path, the critically acclaimed Way of Passion: A Celebration of Rumi, The Return of the Mother and Son of Man. He was the subject of the 1993 BBC documentary "The Making of a Modern Mystic" and is the founder of the Sacred Activism movement.

Harvey lives in Chicago, Illinois, where he continues to write when he is not lecturing. Harvey conducts workshops on Sacred Activism, the teachings of Rumi, yoga and practices that will lead to deeper spiritual awareness. Harvey travels with students to sacred sites in India, Australia and South Africa, and offers personal spiritual direction. Harvey was listed as number 33 in the Watkins' Mind Body Spirit magazine as one of the 100 Most Spiritually Influential Living People in 2012. In 2012, he was nominated for the Templeton Prize, which was awarded to the Dalai Lama.

== Early life and education ==
Harvey was born in Coimbatore, India, on 9 June, 1952 and lived there until he was nine years old. He was educated at English boarding schools and then the University of Oxford, where he later taught Shakespeare and French literature until 1977. He wrote his dissertation on madness in Shakespeare and Erasmus.

== Career ==
At 21 in the early 1970s, Harvey became a fellow of All Souls College, Oxford. By 1977 he had become disillusioned with life at Oxford and returned to India, where a series of mystical experiences initiated his spiritual journey. Over the next thirty years he plunged into different mystical traditions to learn their secrets and practices. In 1978 he met a succession of Indian saints and sages and began his study and practice of Hinduism. In 1983, in Ladakh, he met a great Tibetan Buddhist teacher, Thuksey Rinpoche, and undertook with him the Mahayana Buddhist bodhisattva vows, which he describes in his book A Journey in Ladakh published that same year. Later, in 1990, Harvey would collaborate with Sogyal Rinpoche and Patrick Gaffney in the writing of The Tibetan Book of Living and Dying. In 1984, Harvey began a ten-year-long exploration and explication of Rumi and Sufi mysticism in Paris with a group of French Sufis under the guidance of Eva de Vitray-Meyerovitch, the translator of Rumi into French. In 1992, he met Father Bede Griffiths in his ashram in south India near where Harvey had been born. It was this meeting that helped him synthesize the whole of his mystical explorations and reconcile Eastern with Western mysticism.

While in India, Harvey encountered Mother Meera, who became his guru and the subject of his book Hidden Journey. His memoir, The Sun at Midnight, describes their subsequent break and his disillusionment with gurus.

For the last 30 years, Harvey has travelled widely, living in India, London, Paris, New York and San Francisco, studying, teaching at university level and in seminars and workshops. A prolific writer, Harvey has authored or co-authored over 30 books. His focus since 2005 has been the advocacy of what he terms "Sacred Activism". He is the founder and director of the Institute of Sacred Activism, which trains leaders and social justice advocates.

== Teachings ==
Harvey is a scholar of mystic traditions. He envisions true spirituality to be the divinisation of earthly life through spiritual practice. These practices can take many forms and can be taken from religious traditions. Harvey sees six poets and religious figures as having universal appeal:

- Shakyamuni Buddha as portrayed in the Dhammapada
- Jesus as portrayed in the Gospel of Thomas
- Rumi, a 13th century Sufi poet.
- Kabir, a 15th century Indian poet
- Ramakrishna, a 19th century Hindu sadhu
- Aurobindo, a 20th century Hindu philosopher-sage

Harvey also emphasises the Divine Feminine, as expressed in the Virgin Mary, Kali, the Black Madonna, and Mother Earth.

Since 2005, Andrew Harvey's work has focused on teaching Sacred Activism around the globe. Harvey describes sacred activism as "the product of the union of a profound spiritual and mystical knowledge, understanding, and compassion, peace and energy, with focused, wise, radical action in the world."

== Bibliography ==
- A Journey in Ladakh: Encounters with Buddhism, 1983 (reprinted in 2000). Houghton Mifflin Harcourt, 2000. ISBN 0-618-05675-0
- Hidden Journey: A Spiritual Awakening, 1991
- The Tibetan Book of Living and Dying: A New Spiritual Classic from One of the Foremost Interpreters of Tibetan Buddhism to the West (co-editor), 1992
- The Way of Passion: A Celebration of Rumi. North Atlantic Books/Frog, 1994.
- The Divine Feminine: Exploring the Feminine Face of God Throughout the World, 1996 ISBN 1-57324-035-4
- Light upon light: inspirations from Rumi. North Atlantic Books, 1996. ISBN 1-55643-206-2
- Mary's Vineyard: Daily Meditations, Readings, and Revelations. with Eryk Hanut. Quest Books, 1996. ISBN 0835607453
- The Essential Mystics: The Soul's Journey into Truth. Castle Books, 1998
- The Essential Gay Mystics, 1998 ISBN 0-06-250905-5 (cloth), ISBN 0-06-251524-1
- Son of Man: The Mystical Path to Christ, J.P. Tarcher/Putnam, 1998
- Perfume of the Desert: Inspirations from Sufi Wisdom, with Eryk Hanut. Quest Books, 1999. ISBN 0-8356-0767-4
- The Return of the Mother, 2000
- The Direct Path: Creating a Personal Journey to the Divine Through the World's Traditions, 2001 ISBN 0-7679-0299-8
- The Sun at Midnight: A Memoir of the Dark Night, 2002 ISBN 1-58542-179-0
- A Walk With Four Spiritual Guides: Krishna, Buddha, Jesus, And Ramakrishna. SkyLight Paths Publishing, 2005. ISBN 1594731381
- The Hope: A Guide to Sacred Activism, Hay House, 2009. ISBN 1-4019-2003-9
- Heart Yoga: The Sacred Marriage of Yoga and Mysticism, North Atlantic Books. 2010. ISBN 9781556438974
- Radical passion : sacred love and wisdom in action. North Atlantic Books. 2012. ISBN 9781583945032
