= Sogyal Rinpoche =

Tibetan lama (1947–2019)

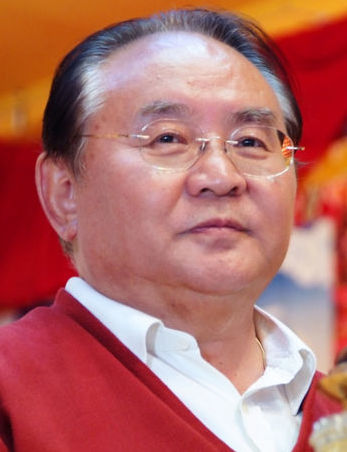
- Title: Rinpoche

Personal life
- Born: Sonam Gyaltsen Lakar; 1947 Trehor, Kham, Tibet
- Died: 28 August 2019 (aged 72) Bangkok, Thailand
- Website: rigpa.org

Religious life
- Religion: Tibetan Buddhism
- School: Dzogchen, Nyingma

Senior posting
- Teacher: Jamyang Khyentse Chökyi Lodrö, Dudjom Rinpoche, Dilgo Khyentse Rinpoche, Nyoshul Khen Rinpoche
- Reincarnation: Tertön Sogyal
- Students: Patrick Gaffney, Christine Longaker, Charles Tart, Arabella Churchill

Sogyal Rinpoche (Tibetan: བསོད་རྒྱལ་, Wylie: Bsod-rgyal; 1947 – 28 August 2019) was a Tibetan Dzogchen lama. He was recognized as the incarnation of a Tibetan master and visionary saint of the 20th century, Tertön Sogyal Lerab Lingpa. Sogyal Rinpoche was the founder and former spiritual director of Rigpa — an international network of over 100 Buddhist centres and groups in 23 countries around the world — and the author of the best-selling book The Tibetan Book of Living and Dying, which has been printed in 30 languages and 56 countries. Before his retirement, in the wake of abuse allegations in 2017, he had been teaching for 40 years in Europe, America, Asia and Australia.

Sogyal Rinpoche had been accused of sexual and physical assault and abuse, as well as misusing charitable funds, with allegations stretching back to the 1970s. In 2017, Rigpa announced these allegations would be investigated by an outside party and a report has now been published, upholding most of the allegations. Sogyal Rinpoche did not respond to the report but stated that "I am clear in my own mind that I have never, ever, acted towards anyone with a motive of selfish gain or harmful intent."

== Life ==
=== Early life and education ===
Sogyal Rinpoche was born Sonam Gyaltsen Lakar in 1947 in what the Tibetans called the Trehor region of Kham, Tibet. According to his mother, the patron of his courtesan aunt and de facto stepfather, Jamyang Khyentse Chökyi Lodrö, recognized him as the incarnation of Tertön Sogyal and supervised his education at Dzongsar Monastery. He studied traditional subjects with several tutors, including Khenpo Appey, who was appointed as his tutor by Dzongsar Khyentse Chökyi Lodrö.

Sogyal Rinpoche attended a Catholic school in Kalimpong, India and then studied at Delhi University in India's capital before coming to the West. In 1971, he was granted a place to study comparative religion at Trinity College, Cambridge as a visiting scholar. He continued to study with many masters, of all schools of Tibetan Buddhism, especially Dudjom Rinpoche, Dilgo Khyentse Rinpoche, and Nyoshul Khenpo Rinpoche. He first began to translate for Dudjom Rinpoche in Kalimpong in India and later continued in the role of his translator in Europe and during a tour of the United States. In 1973 he assisted in organizing the Dalai Lama's first visit to the West in Rome, which included an audience with Pope Paul VI.

=== Teaching and establishing Rigpa ===
Sogyal Rinpoche began to teach in London in 1974. His centre, a house in Kilburn, was originally called Orgyen Chöling. The name later changed to Dzogchen Orgyen Chöling. Dudjom Rinpoche also asked Sogyal Rinpoche to take care of his centre in Rue Burq, Paris, which opened in 1978. In 1979, Sogyal Rinpoche chose the name Rigpa—the innermost, essential nature of mind—for his work.

Rigpa soon established an annual schedule of longer seminars, referred to as retreats, with Sogyal Rinpoche and other teachers leading events in France in the summer, California at Thanksgiving, Germany in Winter, followed by Myall Lakes in Australia, and then England at Easter. The first winter event at Kirchheim in Germany took place in December 1986, annual retreats in Tiona Park in Australia began in 1989, and the first Thanksgiving retreat in the US was in Oakland in 1988.

In 1987, Rinpoche was invited to become spiritual director of the centre in County Cork in the west of Ireland which was to become Dzogchen Beara, Rigpa's first long-term retreat facility. In 1991, Sogyal Rinpoche founded the retreat centre of Lerab Ling near Montpellier in southern France. The first three-month retreat was held there in 1992. A centre in Berlin named Dharma Mati was formally opened in October 2007.

On 11 August 2017, following allegations of physical, emotional and sexual abuse from current and ex-members of Rigpa, Sogyal Rinpoche "decided, with immediate effect, to retire as spiritual director from all the organizations that bear the name of Rigpa in different countries around the world".

=== The Tibetan Book of Living and Dying ===
In 1983, Rinpoche met Elisabeth Kübler-Ross, Kenneth Ring and other figures in the caring professions and near-death research, and they encouraged him to develop his work in opening up the Tibetan teachings on death and helping the dying. Rinpoche continued to teach throughout the world. Then, in 1989 in Nepal, Rinpoche met Andrew Harvey and invited him to help on the project. About the writing process, co-editor Patrick Gaffney said, "Probably, a book has never been written in such an unusual way."

The Tibetan Book of Living and Dying was first launched in the United States in September 1992, where it received high acclaim and spent several weeks at the top of the bestseller lists. It was subsequently released in the United Kingdom, Australia and India, and first translated into German and French. To date, more than two million copies have been printed in 30 languages and 56 countries.

=== Conferences and events ===
Rinpoche was a regular speaker at conferences around the world, addressing topics such as Buddhism in the modern world, death and dying, meditation and happiness. In 2004, he served as a keynote speaker at the Parliament of the World's Religions, where over 8,000 religious leaders and lay people gathered in Barcelona in Spain to discuss the issues of religious violence, access to safe water, the fate of refugees worldwide, and the elimination of developing countries' debts. In August 2008 he joined Robert Thurman at the Aspen Institute in Aspen, Colorado, to speak about "Tibet’s Unique Buddhist Heritage" as part of a symposium called "His Holiness the Dalai Lama at Aspen: A Celebration of Tibetan Culture", organized jointly with the Conservancy for Tibetan Art and Culture. In October 2010 he gave a keynote speech on "Tibetan Buddhism in Modern Western Culture" at the International Conference on Tibetan Buddhism held at Emory University. In 2011, he was a keynote speaker and participant in the Global Buddhist Congregation in Delhi which brought together "religious, spiritual and world leaders, as well as 800 scholars, delegates and observers from 32 countries." "The goal was to examine both the capacity and the resilience of Buddhism to engage with the most pressing concerns of the modern world, namely violence, social and economic disparity, environmental degradation and discord between and within communities and nations" and "to contribute to cultivating and fostering peace, harmony, co-existence and a shared responsibility amidst the diversity of cultures, communities and nations." In 2012, he was a keynote speaker at the Happiness and Its Causes conference in Sydney.

=== In the East ===
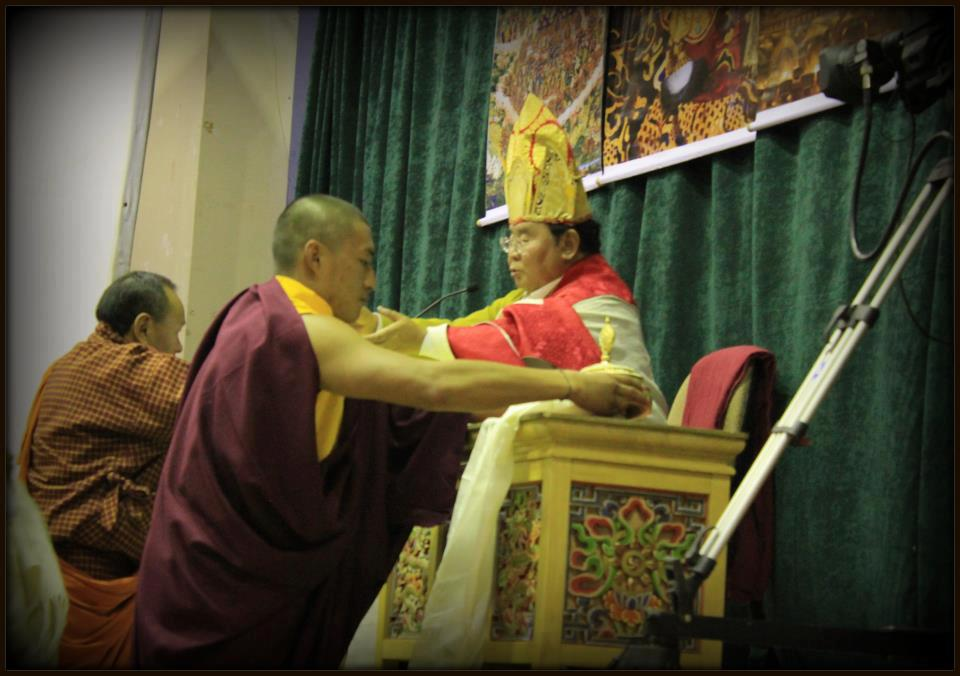
Sogyal Rinpoche performing an empowerment ritual in Bhutan

Rinpoche taught regularly in India, especially in Delhi at the Foundation for Universal Responsibility of His Holiness the Dalai Lama. He also taught in the Himalayan regions of Sikkim, where he lived for part of his childhood, and Bhutan. He had been teaching annually in Bhutan since 2007 and his teachings were regularly shown on television there. The first Prime Minister of Bhutan and champion of its philosophy of Gross National Happiness, Lyonchen Jigme Yoser Thinley, regularly attended Rinpoche's teachings. Sogyal Rinpoche said that he decided to make teaching in Bhutan a priority since it is the only remaining independent Vajrayana Buddhist country in the world. He also said that "today’s younger generation in the Himalayan region needed to understand the Dharma in a practical way" and that "understanding the Dharma in a real way is an important and integral part of the development of Bhutan."

In 1998, Rinpoche was formally offered the throne of Tertön Sogyal's home monastery in Tibet, Kalzang Monastery, by the abbot, Sherab Özer Rinpoche, in a ceremony in France.

=== Death ===
Sogyal Rinpoche died, aged 72, of a pulmonary embolism on 28 August 2019 in Thailand where he was being treated for colorectal cancer.

== Teaching ==
According to Stephen Batchelor, Sogyal Rinpoche "is known for his sense of humour, indefatigable energy, forthrightness and periodic eccentricity." In his teachings, he often focused on the Buddhist understanding of the mind, and what is known in the Tibetan tradition as the nature of mind, pristine awareness or rigpa, along with meditation as a means for ultimately realizing the nature of mind. Other common topics were death and dying, which is one of the main themes of his book, "The Tibetan Book of Living and Dying".

In what he saw as a continuation of the non-sectarian Rimé (Tib. ris med) movement, which rose to prominence in eastern Tibet in the nineteenth century, he frequently referred to teachings of all Tibetan traditions, and also quoted from non-Tibetan sources, such as the Dhammapada, and teachers belonging to other traditions such as the Zen master, Shunryu Suzuki. He wrote:

I feel there is an intriguing parallel between the extraordinary richness of the spiritual culture of Tibet at the time of the great pioneers of this Rimé movement, like Jamyang Khyentse Wangpo and Jamgön Kongtrul, and the great variety of lineages we find in the West today. In some ways the Rimé vision offers a model of how the Dharma must continue in the West and in America, with total respect for our separate authentic traditions, and yet with an eye to the creativity and resourcefulness of different branches of Buddha-dharma as they have settled into the American landscape. We can all inspire, help, and network with one another, yet without confusion or inappropriate mixing of our traditions.

Rinpoche liked to recount stories of his own teachers and to stress the importance of devotion, often quoting Dilgo Khyentse Rinpoche, who said, "Devotion is the essence of the path." Still, according to Charles Tart, he "encourages his students to direct their devotion toward his teachers rather than toward him personally, even though most of Tibetan Buddhism puts tremendous emphasis on devotion towards one's teacher."

== Abuse allegations ==
In 1994, a $10 million civil lawsuit was filed against Sogyal Rinpoche. It was alleged that he had used his position as a spiritual leader to induce one of his female students to have sexual relations with him. The complaint included accusations of infliction of emotional distress, breach of fiduciary duty, as well as assault and battery. The lawsuit was settled out of court.

In 2011, related allegations were introduced by journalist Mary Finnigan, who was also the main author of the original article in 1995.

In 2014, Marion Dapsance reported on her seven-year investigation of Sogyal Rinpoche. The experiences of one of her respondents, "Mimi", a long-term female attendant of Sogyal Rinpoche, were also published in 2016 in l'Obs detailing the sexual and psychological abuse she and her fellow-attendants endured. Another victim of Sogyal Rinpoche spoke out in the Dutch current affairs program Brandpunt on 13 June 2017.

On 20 July 2017, Buddhist publication Lion's Roar published an article with excerpts from a letter written and sent to Sogyal Rinpoche by current and former senior Rigpa students, filled with details of accusations. The eight students were all long-serving Rigpa members, many holding senior positions within the Rigpa organization, including directors, a former board member, and personal assistants to Sogyal Rinpoche. The twelve page letter, dated 14 July 2017, explicitly describes sexual, physical, and emotional abuse by Sogyal Rinpoche of Rigpa students, extending over a long period. It states that they have been beaten severely, were asked to perform sexual acts and lie in order to conceal Sogyal's misbehavior. The letter also describes that Sogyal has a lavish and indulgent lifestyle, and depicts a cavalier use of donations to support this lifestyle, and a tyrannical and abusive manner towards those who worked closely with him and who were often key in managing the Rigpa organization.

The letter also states that the public face of Sogyal Rinpoche was carefully crafted and managed to promote a person who was wise, compassionate, and virtually infallible, an image which was greatly at odds with the private Sogyal Rinpoche, whose abusive and narcissistic personality and deeds were kept hidden at great effort from the public and the wider Rigpa sangha by his inner circle.

Matthieu Ricard, a close adviser to the Dalai Lama, has stated that Sogyal-Lakar's behaviour, as described in the letter, "is obviously unacceptable — from the point of view of ordinary morality, let alone that of Buddhist ethics. This is all the more so given the considerable suffering that has resulted from such actions".

On 1 August 2017, at a conference held in Ladakh, India, the Dalai Lama addressed the issue of misconduct in Buddhist communities, saying "Sogyal Rinpoche, my very good friend. Now he is disgraced." This criticism was extended to Rigpa's organisation during an interaction with students from the University of California, San Diego, at his residence in Dharamsala on 6 September 2017.

On 3 August 2017, the French Buddhist Union (L’Union Bouddhiste de France) suspended the membership of Rigpa France and its Rigpa Lérab Ling Centre, and lifted the suspension in 2019.

On 11 August 2017, Sogyal retired from his position as Rigpa's spiritual director in the wake of the abuse allegations.

On 5 September 2018, Rigpa released the report produced by the investigation of UK law firm Lewis Silkin LLP.

== Films and documentaries ==
Sogyal Rinpoche appeared in Bernardo Bertolucci's 1993 film Little Buddha in the role of Kenpo Tenzin. He featured in Frank Cvitanovich's The Making of a Modern Mystic, made for the BBC in 1993. He was also the subject of a documentary by German filmmaker Boris Penth called Sogyal Rinpoche: Ancient Wisdom for the Modern World (Mitgefühl, Weisheit und Humor), which includes interviews with John Cleese and former Tibetan prime minister Samdhong Rinpoche. It was premiered at the International Buddhist Film Festival in London in 2008 and shown in other film festivals around the world. He is also featured in Sasha Meyerowitz's 2008 documentary Teachings on Milarepa.

His alleged sexual and spiritual abuses are discussed in the 2022 German-French ARTE documentary, Buddhismus: Missbrauch im Namen der Erleuchtung ("Buddhism: Abuse in the name of enlightenment") by Elodie Emery and Wandrille Lanos.

Year	Title	Role	Notes
1993	Little Buddha	Kenpo Tenzin	

== Publications ==
=== Books ===
- Sogyal Rinpoche (1990). Dzogchen and Padmasambhava (2nd ed.). Rigpa Publications. ISBN 0-9624884-0-2.
- Sogyal Rinpoche (1994). The Tibetan Book of Living and Dying. HarperCollins. ISBN 0-06-250834-2.
- Sogyal Rinpoche (1995). Glimpse After Glimpse: Daily Reflections on Living and Dying. Rider. ISBN 0-7126-6237-5.
- Sogyal Rinpoche (2002). The Future of Buddhism. Rider & Co. ISBN 0-7126-1564-4.

=== Articles and contributions ===
- Sogyal Rinpoche (2004). Ray, Reginald A. (ed.). The Pocket Tibetan Buddhist Reader. Boston, MA: Shambhala Publications. ISBN 1-57062-851-3.
- Sogyal Rinpoche (2004). "In the Mirror of Death". In Meeske, Kathryn (ed.). Sacred Voices of the Nyingma Masters. California: Padma Publishing. pp. 148–161. ISBN 1-881847-35-7.
- Sogyal Rinpoche (2005). "The Remembrance of Past Lives from the Tibetan Buddhist Perspective". In Cott, Jonathon (ed.). On the Sea of Memory: A Journey from Forgetting to Remembering. Random House. ISBN 1-4000-6058-3.
- Sogyal Rinpoche (2006). "Gift of Dharma". In Coburn, Brot (ed.). Himalaya: Personal Stories of Grandeur, Challenge and Hope. National Geographic Books. pp. 62–67. ISBN 978-0792261926.
- Sogyal Rinpoche (2012). "Sogyal Rinpoche". In Bradley, Rosalind (ed.). A World of Prayer: Spiritual Leaders, Activists, and Humanitarians Share their Favorite Prayers. Orbis Books. pp. 150–151. ISBN 978-1-57075-952-9.
- Sogyal Rinpoche (2012). "Tibetan Buddhism in Modern Western Culture". In Schuyler, Kathryn Goldman (ed.). Inner Peace—Global Impact: Tibetan Buddhism, Leadership, and Work. Information Age Publishing. ISBN 978-1-61735-918-7.
- Sogyal Rinpoche (2013). "Understanding the Mind and Meditation: A Buddhist Approach to Well-Being". In Fraser, Andy (ed.). The Healing Power of Meditation: Leading Experts on Buddhism, Psychology, and Medicine Explore the Health Benefits of Contemplative Practice. Shambhala Publications. pp. 3–17. ISBN 978-1611800593.

=== Forewords and introductions ===
- Longaker, Christine (1998), Facing Death and Finding Hope: A Guide to the Emotional and Spiritual Care of the Dying, Arrow Books, ISBN 0-09-917692-0
- Namdrol, Khenpo (1999), The Practice of Vajrakilaya, Snow Lion Publications, ISBN 1-55939-103-0
- Gyatso, Tenzin (2000), Dzogchen: The Heart Essence of the Great Perfection, Snow Lion Publications, ISBN 1-55939-219-3
- Tsoknyi Rinpoche (2003), Fearless Simplicity: The Dzogchen Way of Living Freely in a Complex World, Rangjung Yeshe Publications, ISBN 962-7341-48-7
- Farber, Don (2005), Portraits of Tibetan Buddhist Masters, University of California Press, ISBN 0-520-23973-3
- Nyoshul Khenpo Rinpoche; Barron, Richard (2005), A Marvelous Garland of Rare Gems: Biographies of Masters of Awareness in the Dzogchen Lineage (A Spiritual History of the Teachings on Natural Great Perfection), Padma Publications, ISBN 1-881847-41-1
- Tulku Urgyen Rinpoche (2005), Blazing Splendor: The Memoirs of Tulku Urgyen Rinpoche, North Atlantic Books, ISBN 962-7341-56-8
- Gyatso, Tenzin (2007), Mind in Comfort and Ease, Wisdom Publications, ISBN 978-0-86171-493-3
- Khyentse, Dilgo; Jinpa Palmo, Ani (2008), Brilliant Moon: The Autobiography of Dilgo Khyentse, Shambhala Publications, ISBN 978-1-59030-284-2
- Gerstein, Mordicai (2012), The Mountains of Tibet, Barefoot Books, ISBN 9781782850472
