= Tertön Sogyal =

Tibetan Buddhist tertön

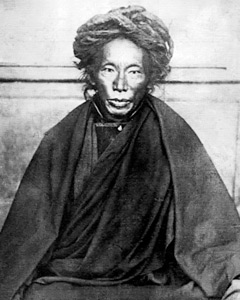
Lérab Lingpa in 1913

Tertön Sogyal Lerab Lingpa (Tibetan: གཏེར་སྟོན་བསོད་རྒྱལ་ལས་རབ་གླིང་པ་, Wylie: gter ston bsod rgyal las rab gling pa, 1856-1926) was a Tibetan Buddhist tertön and a teacher of the Thirteenth Dalai Lama.

== Biography ==
As a child, Tertön Sogyal was taught by Nyala Pema Duddul, Patrul Rinpoche, and Khenpo Pema Vajra at Dzogchen Monastery.

In the later years of his life, he stayed near Dodrupchen Monastery, often exchanging teachings with Dodrupchen Jikmé Tenpé Nyima.

He died on the tenth day of the second lunar month of the year of the Fire Tiger (1926), which is March 23, 1926 in the Gregorian calendar.

== Disciples ==
His disciples included the Thirteenth Dalai Lama Thubten Gyatso, Jamgön Kongtrul, the Fifth Dzogchen Rinpoche (Thubten Chökyi Dorje), Dzogchen Khenpo Pema Vajra, Jamgon Ju Mipham Gyatso, Nyoshul Lungtok, Dzahka Choktrul Rinpoche, Tertön Drimé, Kathok Situ, Minyak Khenpo Kunzang Sonam, Dodrupchen Jikmé Tenpé Nyima, Demo Rinpoche, Dorje Drak Rigdzin Nyamnyi Dorje (1886-1932/5), Minling Trichen Rinpoche, Sakya Trichen, the Fifteenth Karmapa Khakhyab Dorje, Amdo Geshe Jampal Rolwe Lodrö and Jamyang Khyentse Chökyi Lodrö.

His disciples also included Tulku Tsultrim Zangpo (aka Tsüllo) of Shukjung Monastery, who composed a biography of Tertön Sogyal which is more than 700 pages long. His lineage also passed on to his sons, such as Rigdzin Namgyal and Chöpel Gyatso, and to his grandson, Tromgé Tulku Dechen Dorjé, who currently lives at the Tromgé encampment in eastern Tibet (Khams).

== Reincarnations ==
There were three main incarnations of Tertön Sogyal: Khenpo Jigme Phuntsok, Sogyal Rinpoche and Gendün Rinchen (1926-1997), the 69th Je Khenpo of Bhutan.

== See also ==
- Simhamukha
