= Orgyen Tobgyal =

Tibetan politician

Orgyen Tobgyal Rinpoche, also called Tulku Ugyen Topgyal, is a Tibetan Buddhist lama who was born in Kham in Eastern Tibet in 1951, living in exile in India.

== Life ==
Orgyen Tobgyal Rinpoche, born in 1951 in Riwoche in Kham, Eastern Tibet is the eldest son of the 3rd Neten Chokling Rinpoche. He has 3 younger brothers: Jamyang Gyaltsen, Khyentse Yeshe Rinpoche, and Dzigar Kongtrul Rinpoche and one sister. By 1959, he left Tibet with his parents and oldest brother and went to Sikkim, where they lived for few years. In 1967, his father, the 3rd Neten Chokling Rinpoche began the construction of a Tibetan settlement in Bir, Himachal Pradesh, North East India, and died in India in 1973 right after a car accident.

Orgyen Tobgyal Rinpoche then took over the care of the monastery in Bir. His father's reincarnation, Neten Chokling was born August 10, 1973, in a modest family in Wandipodzong, in Bhutan, and was recognized by the 16th Karmapa as well as by Dilgo Khyentse Rinpoche. At the age of 7, he was taken to the monastery of his predecessor in Bir.

Orgyen Tobgyal Rinpoche was one of the teachers of the young reincarnation of his father, and in 2004 he passed over the full responsibility of the monastery to Neten Chokling.

Orgyen Tobgyal Rinpoche received transmissions of Buddhist teachings from Dzongsar Khyentse Chökyi Lodrö and from Dilgo Khyentse Rinpoche, with whom he went to the West. He first taught in Dordogne, France, at Chanteloube, which is the centre of the six sons and daughters of Kangyur Rinpoche.

Between 2004 and 2006 Orgyen Tobgyal Rinpoche visited Tibet twice to rebuild Neten Gön, the monastery of his father Neten Chokling.

Orgyen Tobgyal Rinpoche was a Member of the Tibetan Parliament for the region of Kham from 1994 to 1996 and was reelected in 2001 and 2006 to the 13th and the 14th Parliament in exile.
