= Gian Domenico Borasio =

Physician, specialist of palliative medicine

- Born: 9 July 1962 (age 63); Novara
- Occupation: Doctor

Gian Domenico Borasio (born 9 July 1962 in Novara) is a physician specialist of palliative medicine. He is professor of palliative medicine at the University of Lausanne and head of the Service of Palliative Care of the University Hospital of Lausanne (Switzerland).

== Publications ==
As author

- Über das Sterben. Was wir wissen. Was wir tun können. Wie wir uns darauf einstellen. Beck, Munich 2011 (ISBN 978-3-406-61708-9).
- Selbstbestimmt sterben. Was es bedeutet. Was uns daran hindert. Wie wir es erreichen können. Beck, Munich 2014 (ISBN 978-3-406-66862-3).
- (in French) Mourir. Ce que l'on sait, ce que l'on peut faire, comment s'y préparer, Presses polytechniques et universitaires romandes, Lausanne, 2014 (ISBN 978-2-889-15011-3).
- (in French) L'autonomie en fin de vie. Le débat allemand, des pistes pour la Suisse, un enjeu pour tous, Presses polytechniques et universitaires romandes, Lausanne, 2017 (ISBN 9782889152223).

As editor

- With Ingeborg Maria Husemeyer: Ernährung bei Schluckstörungen. Eine Sammlung von Rezepten, die das Schlucken erleichtern.
- With Ralf J. Jox, Katja Kühlmeyer: Leben im Koma. Kohlhammer Verlag, Stuttgart 2011.
- With Hans-Joachim Heßler, Ralf J. Jox, Christoph Meier: Patientenverfügung. Das neue Gesetz in der Praxis. Kohlhammer Verlag, Stuttgart 2012.
- With Franz-Joseph Bormann: Sterben. Dimensionen eines anthropologischen Grundphänomens. De Gruyter, Berlin 2012.
