= Roqueredonde =

- Commune
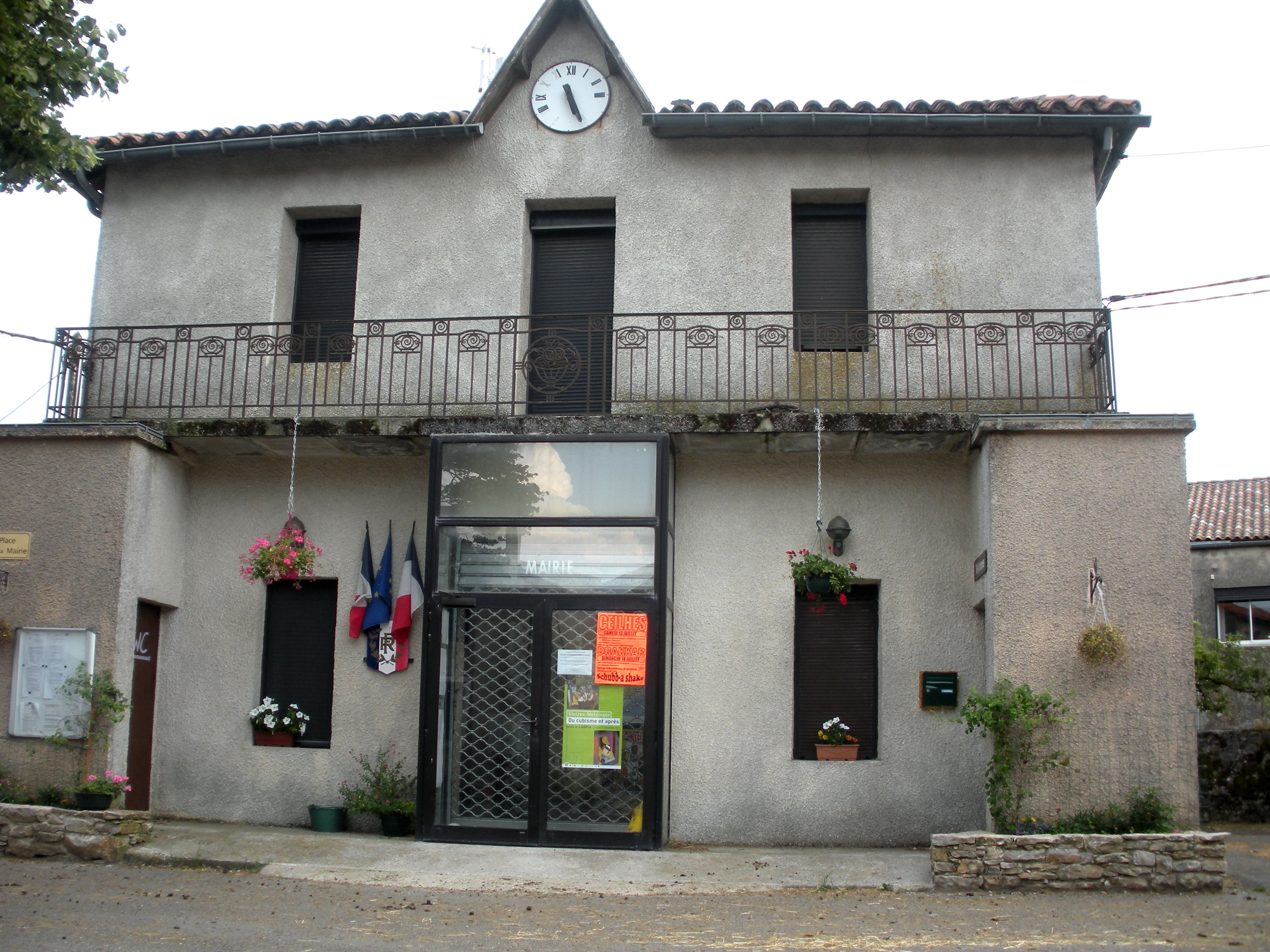
- Town hall

- Coat of arms
- Location of Roqueredonde
- Location within France Location within Occitanie
- Coordinates: 43°48′05″N 3°12′46″E
- Country: France
- Region: Occitania
- Department: Hérault
- Arrondissement: Lodève
- Canton: Lodève

Government
  - Mayor (2022–2026): Félicien Venot
- Area^{1}: 22.71 km^{2} (8.77 sq mi)
- Elevation: 732 m (2,402 ft)
- Highest elevation: 853 m (2,799 ft)
- Lowest elevation: 453 m (1,486 ft)
- Population (2023): 211
  - Density: 9.29/km^{2} (24.1/sq mi)
- Time zone: UTC+01:00 (CET)
  - Summer (DST): UTC+02:00 (CEST)
- INSEE/Postal code: 34233 /34650
- ^{1} French Land Register data, which excludes lakes, ponds, glaciers > 1 km^{2} (0.386 sq mi or 247 acres) and river estuaries.

Roqueredonde (French pronunciation: [ʁɔkʁədɔ̃d]; Occitan: Tiudaç) is a commune in the Hérault department in the Occitanie region in southern France. Les Cabrils station has rail connections to Béziers, Millau and Saint-Chély-d'Apcher.

== Population ==
Historical population
Year	Pop.	±% p.a.
1968	202	—
1975	206	+0.28%
1982	196	−0.71%
1990	169	−1.84%
1999	138	−2.23%
2007	163	+2.10%
2012	245	+8.49%
2017	209	−3.13%
2023	211	+0.16%
Source: INSEE

== See also ==
- Communes of the Hérault department
