= Lerab Ling =

Tibetan Buddhist centre in Occitanie, France

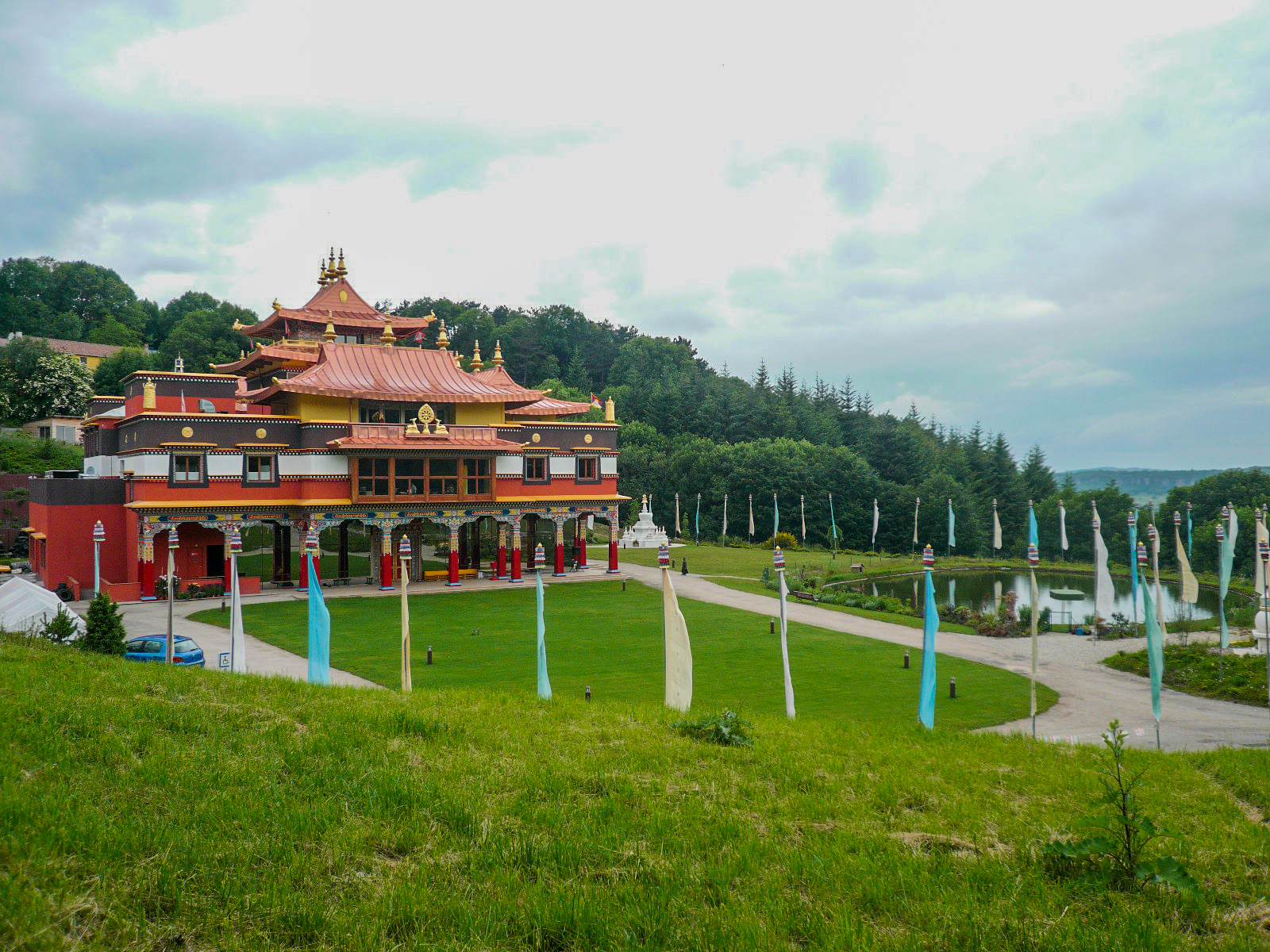
- The three-storey Tibetan style temple at Lerab Ling

Religion
- Affiliation: Buddhism

Location
- Location: Roqueredonde
- Country: France
- Interactive map of Lerab Ling
- Coordinates: 43°48′21.92″N 3°13′58.73″E

Architecture
- Completed: 1992

Website
- www.lerabling.org

Lerab Ling is a Tibetan Buddhist centre founded in 1992 by Sogyal Rinpoche in Roqueredonde, near Lodève in Occitanie, France. It contains perhaps the largest Tibetan Buddhist temple in Europe, which was officially inaugurated by the Dalai Lama in 2008 at a ceremony attended by Carla Bruni-Sarkozy.

== History ==
Before it became a buddhist retreat centre, the land was known as L'Engayresque, which means 'the place of springs' in the ancient Occitan language. The site was chosen by Dilgo Khyentse Rinpoche in 1990, and was then blessed by Dodrupchen Rinpoche in 1991. It has hosted Rigpa's annual summer retreats since 1992. Since then it has been visited by many of the highest ranking lamas of all Tibetan Buddhist schools, including the Dalai Lama who visited both in 2000 and 2008, and Sakya Trizin in 2007. From 2006 until 2009 a traditional three-year retreat took place with over 300 participants.

== Temple ==
The three-storey temple at Lerab Ling with its distinctive copper roofs is based on traditional Tibetan architecture. Its centrepiece is a seven-metre-high (23 ft) statue of Buddha Shakyamuni crafted in Burma. It also includes 1000 bronze buddha statues representing the 1000 buddhas of this kalpa (aeon). There is a statue of Padmasambhava in the lake to the north-east of the main temple.

== Monastic community ==
Ordained monks and nuns living in Lerab Ling have been formally recognized as a religious congregation under French law.

== Gallery ==
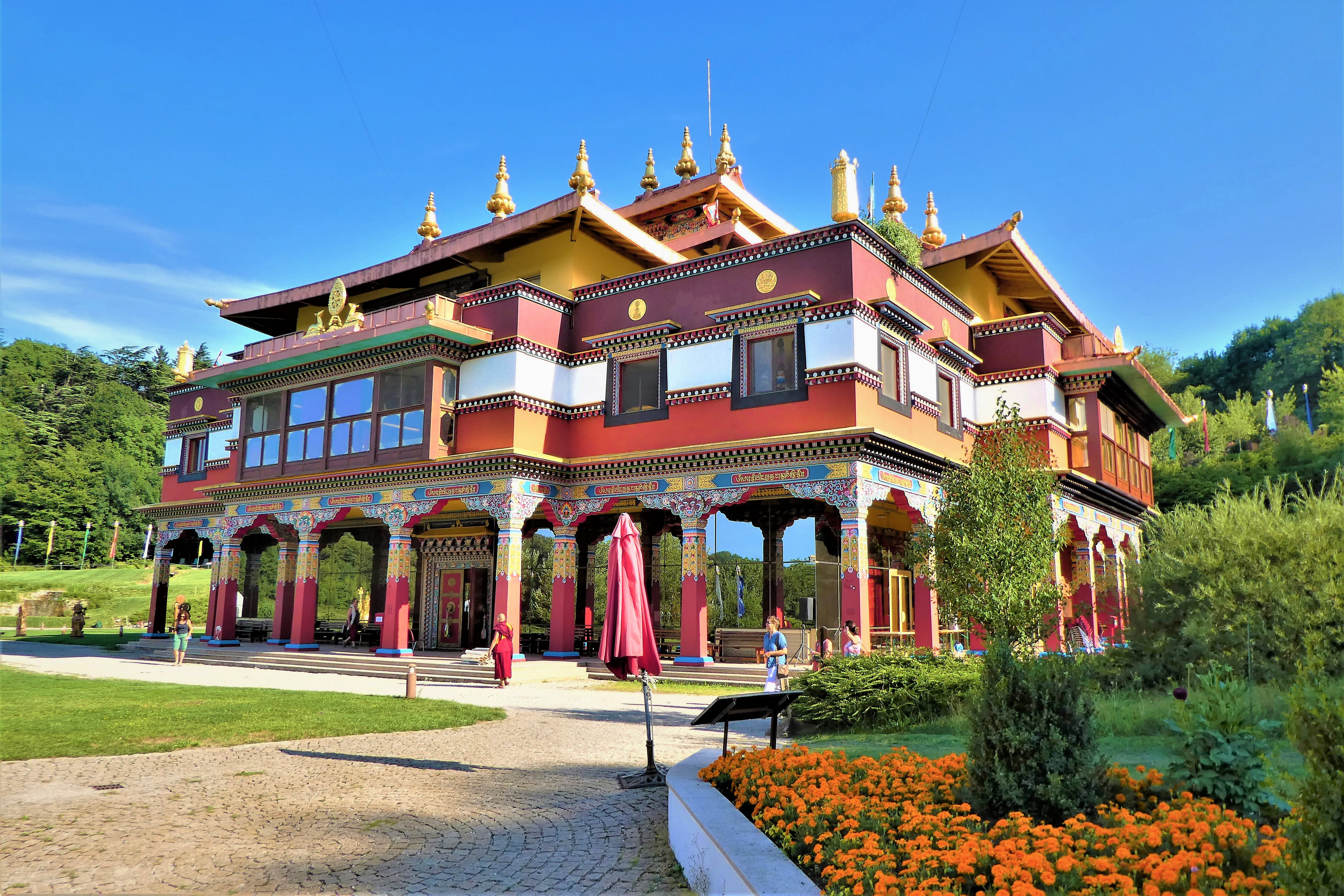

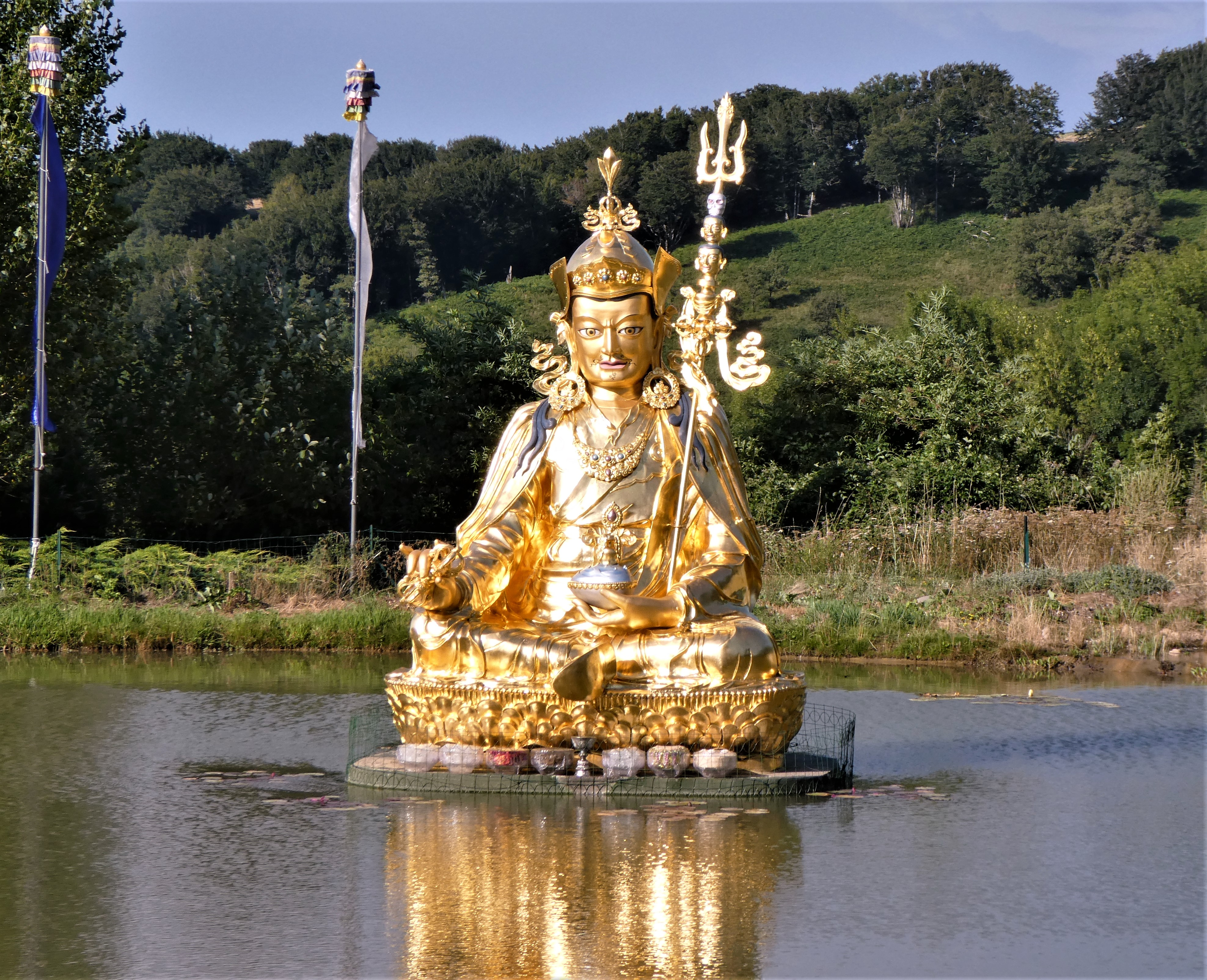

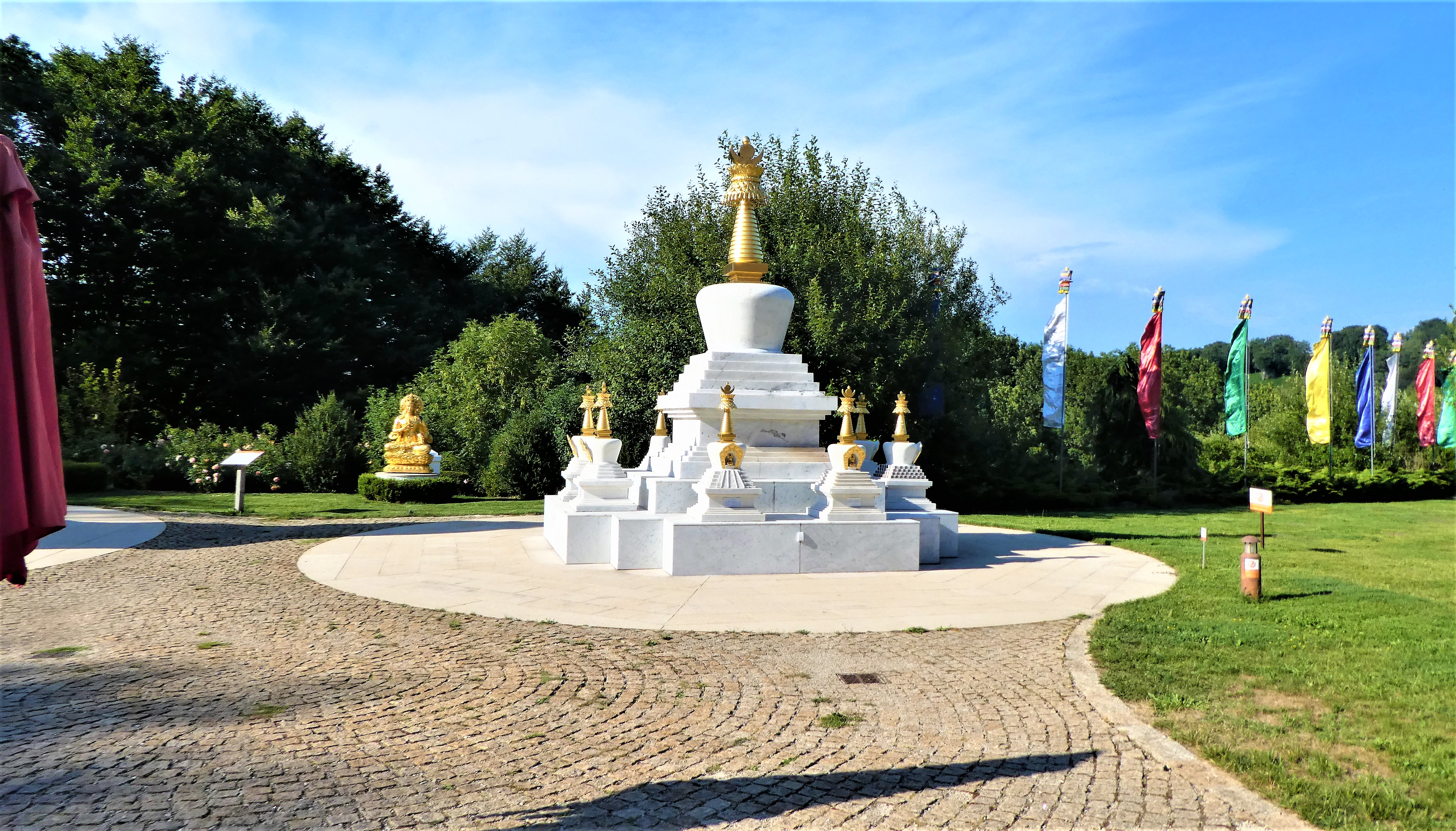

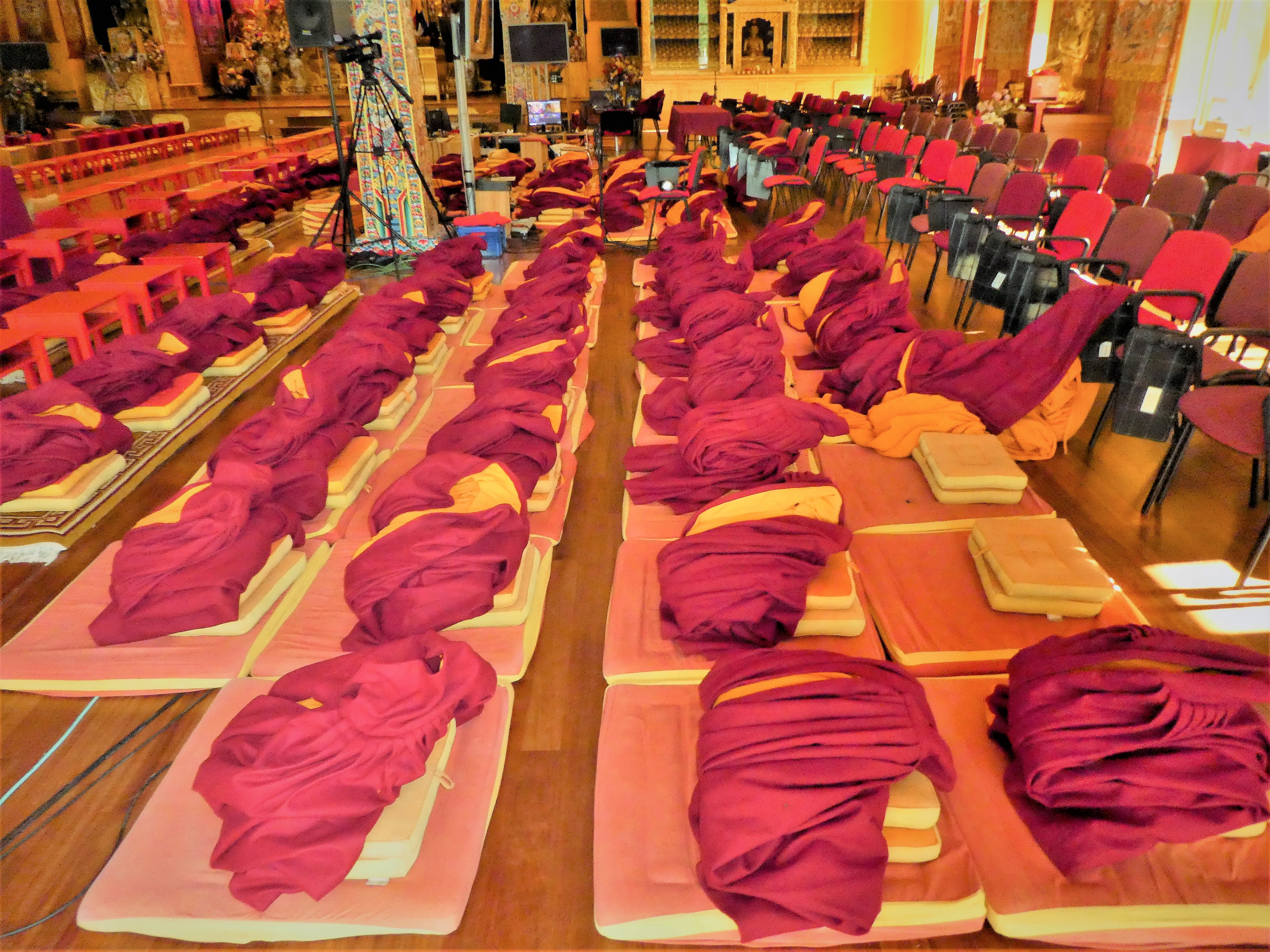

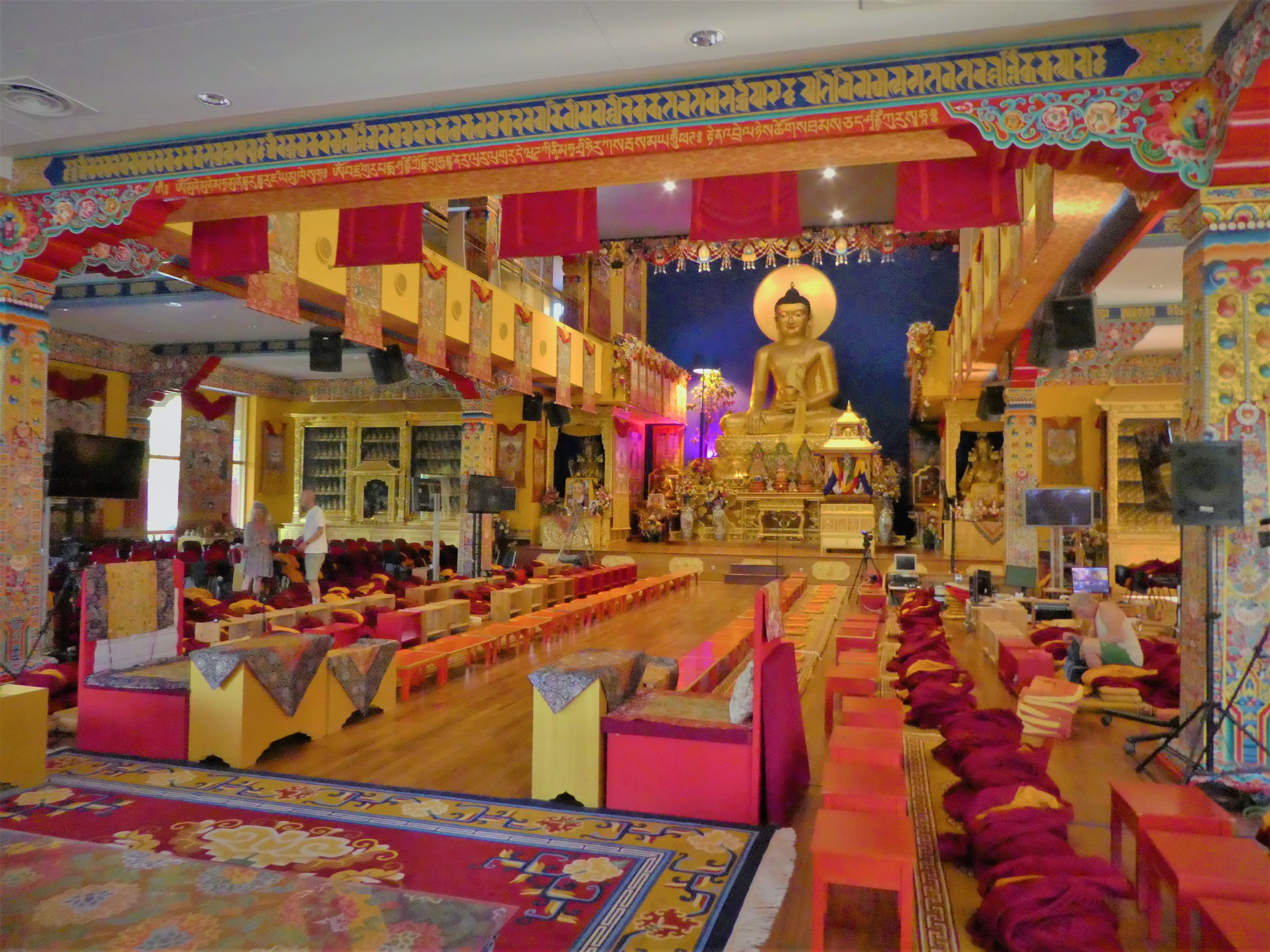
