= Miss Nepal 2011 =

- Date: August 30, 2011
- Venue: Tribhuvan Army Club, Kathmandu
- Broadcaster: NTV
- Entrants: 19
- Winner: Malina Joshi; Dharan

Hidden Treasures Miss Nepal 2011, the 15th Miss Nepal beauty pageant was held on the August 30, 2011, at the Tribhuvan Army Club in Kathmandu. The new main sponsor for the event Dabur Nepal was Lux. This year, 19 young women aged 19 years and above, had been shortlisted for the final from across the country. Sadichha Shrestha Miss Nepal 2010 winner, crowned her successor in the finale event at Tribhuvan Army Club. The winner, Malina Joshi, represented Nepal in the international pageants of Miss World 2011. First Runner Up Anupama Aura Gurung represented Nepal at Miss Earth 2011, and Sarina Maskey went to the Miss International 2011.

== Results ==
Color keys

- The contestant Won in an International pageant.
- The contestant was a Runner-up in an International pageant.
- The contestant was a Semi-Finalist in an International pageant.
- The contestant assumed another title.
- The contestant was not able to compete in an International pageant.
- The contestant did not place but won a Special Award in the pageant.
- The contestant did not place.

Final results	Contestant	International pageant	International Results
Miss Nepal 2011 (Winner)	(Nepal) Dharan - Malina Joshi	Miss World 2011	Unplaced; Top 30 - Beauty With a Purpose
Miss Nepal 2011 (Winner)	(Nepal) Dharan - Malina Joshi	Miss Asia Pacific World 2013	Top 15
1st runner-up (Miss Earth Nepal 2011)	(Nepal) Chitwan - Anupama Aura Gurung	Miss Earth 2011	Unplaced
2nd runner-up (Miss International Nepal 2011)	(Nepal) Narayangarh - Sarina Maskey	Miss International 2011	Unplaced
3rd runner-up	(Nepal) Bhaktapur - Manisha Bista		
4th runner-up	(Nepal) Birgunj - Neha Paudel		
Top 10	(Nepal) Dharan – Pratibha Shrestha		
Top 10	Kathmandu – Biki Gadtaula		
Top 10	Kathmandu – Prasansha Rana		
Top 10	(Nepal) Lumbini – Shruti Pandey		
Top 10	(Nepal) Taplejung – Bishnu Chemjong		

=== Sub-titles ===
Award	Contestant
Miss Photogenic	(Nepal) Bhaktapur – Manisha Bista
Miss Personality	(Nepal) Birtamod - Namrata Dahal
Miss Beautiful Complexion	(Nepal) Tulsipur - Neeta Yoji
Miss Perseverance	(Nepal) Pokhara - Madina Begum
Miss Talent	(Nepal) Taplejung - Bishnu Chemjong
Miss Popular Choice	(Nepal) Birgunj - Neha Paudel
Miss Beautiful Smile	(Nepal) Dharan - Pratibha Shrestha

== Judges ==
- Manisha Koirala - Bollywood Actress
- Zenisha Moktan - Miss Nepal 2009
- Yogeshwar Amatya - Singer
- Rajendra Bajagain
- Ajaya Bhadra Khanal - Editor of The Himalayan Times Newspaper
- Promi Pradhan - HR Professional who works at Himalayan Bank
- Shailaja Adhikary - Director of the IEC fashion school
- Shreejana Rana - Entrepreneur
- Ritu Singh Vaidya - Miss India 1991
- Deepak Kharel - Singer
- Yeso Bardhan Pradhan - Chief Judge

== Contestants ==
Province No. 1 & Province No. 2 (Eastern & South-Eastern Regions)
No	Name	Age	Height	Representing	District	Placement	Notes
4	Namrata Dahal	24	1.70 m (5 ft 7 in)	Birtamod	Jhapa District	Miss Personality	
7	Malina Joshi	23	1.73 m (5 ft 8 in)	Dharan	Sunsari District	Winner	
10	Pratibha Shrestha	19	1.70 m (5 ft 7 in)	Dharan	Sunsari District	Top 10; Miss Beautiful Smile	
15	Bishnu Chemjong	24	1.68 m (5 ft 6 in)	Taplejung	Taplejung District	Top 10; Miss Talent	

Bagmati Province (Central Regions)
No	Name	Age	Height	Representing	District	Placement	Notes
1	Prasmita Sharma	22	1.68 m (5 ft 6 in)	Kathmandu	Kathmandu District		
2	Nisha Joshi	19	1.70 m (5 ft 7 in)	Kathmandu	Kathmandu District		
3	Manisha Bista	22	1.75 m (5 ft 9 in)	Bhaktapur	Bhaktapur District	3rd Runner Up; Miss Photogenic	
5	Neha Paudel	19	1.68 m (5 ft 6 in)	Birgunj	Parsa District	4th Runner Up; Miss Perseverance	
6	Prasansha Rana	19	1.68 m (5 ft 6 in)	Kathmandu	Kathmandu District	Top 10	
8	Shreeja Shrestha	22	1.68 m (5 ft 6 in)	Bhaktapur	Bhaktapur District		
11	Aruna Shrestha	22	1.78 m (5 ft 10 in)	Bhaktapur	Bhaktapur District		
12	Dipenti Shrestha	20	1.70 m (5 ft 7 in)	Sanepa	Lalitpur District		
14	Rajita Khadka	21	1.65 m (5 ft 5 in)	Kathmandu	Kathmandu District		
16	Sarina Maskey	24	1.75 m (5 ft 9 in)	Narayangarh	Chitwan District	2nd Runner Up; Miss Photogenic; Miss Talent	
17	Biki Gadtaula	19	1.68 m (5 ft 6 in)	Kathmandu	Kathmandu District	Top 10	
19	Anupama Aura Gurung	22	1.70 m (5 ft 7 in)	Chitwan	Chitwan District	1st Runner Up; Miss Beautiful Hair	

Gandaki Province, Lumbini Province, Karnali Province & Sudurpashchim Province (Western, Southern & Far-Western Regions)
No	Name	Age	Height	Representing	District	Placement	Notes
9	Shruti Pandey	23	1.68 m (5 ft 6 in)	Lumbini	Rupandehi District	Top 10	
13	Madina Begum	22	1.70 m (5 ft 7 in)	Pokhara	Kaski District	Miss Popular Choice	
18	Neeta Yoji	22	1.68 m (5 ft 6 in)	Tulsipur	Dang District	Miss Beautiful Complexion	

== Notes ==
- Contestant #05, Neha Paudel was selected as the first in Little Miss Birgunj 2003.
- Contestant #07, Malina Joshi was top 5 finalist in Miss Angel 2010.
- Contestant #08, Shreeja Shrestha is the 2nd Runner Up in the Miss Newa 2008 contest.
- Contestant #10, Pratibha Shrestha was crowned as Miss Purbanchal 2011.
- Contestant #13, Madina Begum is the first ever Muslim contestant to take part in Miss Nepal beauty pageant.
- Contestant #15, Bishnu Chemjong had won the all-Nepal singing competition, Nepal Star in 2006.
- Contestant #17, Biki Gadtaula was 2nd Runner Up in Miss Global Nepal 2010.
- Contestant #19, Anupama Aura Gurung was contestant in Miss Mongol 2010 and won the Miss Personality title.
