= Sarina Maskey =

Nepalese beauty pageant winner (born 1987)

- Born: Sarina Maskey; 27 May 1987 (age 39); Gorkha, Nepal
- Height: 1.68 m (5 ft 6 in)
- Beauty pageant titleholder
- Title: Miss International Nepal 2011
- Hair color: Dark brown
- Eye color: Brown
- Major competitions: Miss Nepal 2011; Miss International Nepal; Miss International 2011

Sarina Maskey (born 27 May 1987) is a Nepalese fashion model and beauty pageant titleholder. She was crowned Miss Nepal International 2011 and represented Nepal in Miss International 2011.

== Biography ==
Sarina Maskey represented Nepal at the 2011 51st Miss International Beauty Pageant in Chengdu, China. She was selected for the main sponsor round and performed a traditional dance along with five other participants. She also participated in the charity event and auctioned an Ankhi-Jhyal.

She showcased various textile designs during the Craft Walk 2011, organized by the Handicraft Design & Development Center. She also modeled at the Fashion Gala 2012, organized by House of Fashion & Event Extravaganza.

Awards and achievements
Preceded by Sanyukta Timsina (Nepal)	Miss International Nepal; 2011	Succeeded by Subeksha Khadka (Nepal)
