= Anupama Aura Gurung =

Nepali beauty pageant winner

- Born: Anupama Gurung; Singapore
- Height: 1.66 m (5 ft 5 1/2 in)
- Beauty pageant titleholder
- Title: Miss Nepal 2011

Anupama Aura Gurung (Nepali: अनुपमा गुरुङ) (born 16 August 1988) is a Singaporean-Nepalese model and beauty pageant titleholder who won Miss Nepal Earth 2011. She represented Nepal at the Miss Earth 2011 pageant which was held on 12 November 2011 in Pattaya, Thailand.

== Early life ==
Anupama Aura Gurung, real name Anupama Gurung, was born on 16 August 1988, Singapore to a Gurkha Contingent officer and lived in Singapore till she was 21. Gurung spent her secondary school years at Geylang Methodist Secondary School where she was vice-captain of the softball team. She enjoys public speaking and hosting events. She speaks English fluently, Nepali conversationally and some Mandarin.

She completed her nursing diploma in Nanyang Polytechnic in Singapore and is now pursuing her BBA from Islington College (formerly known as Informatics) Nepal where her major is in Business. An ambitious being, she had set her mind to become an entrepreneur at age of 15. She is living currently (2013) in Kathmandu, she still follows her dreams and wants to give back to Nepal, her vision is to support the country's economy and create job opportunities for the people. In 2010, she competed in Miss Mongol 2010 pageant. Although she did not reach the top 5, she left with the title of Miss Personality.

== Miss Nepal ==
Anupama joined Miss Nepal 2011 beauty pageant as Miss Chitwan 2011 and ended up as the first runner up as well as the winner of Miss Best Hair title. She went on to compete in Miss Earth 2011 in the Manila, Philippines.

Awards and achievements
| Preceded by Sahana Bajracharya (Nepal) | Miss Nepal Earth; 2011 | Succeeded by Nagma Shrestha (Nepal) |
