= Lumbini Development Trust =

Organisation in Nepal

- लुम्बिनी बिकाश कोष
- Formation: 1985; 41 years ago
- Type: GO
- Headquarters: Lumbini Sanskritik, Lumbini
- Website: lumbinidevtrust.gov.np

Lumbini Development Trust (1985) or (लुम्बिनी बिकाश कोष) was founded for the purposes of restoring the Lumbini Garden under the master plan of the government of Nepal. Lumbini is the birthplace of Gautama Buddha, the founder of Buddhism, who was born in the 7th or 6th century BC.According to Buddhist tradition, Maya Devi (or Mayadevi) gave birth to the Buddha on her way to her parents’ home in Devadaha in the month of May in the year 623 BC. Feeling the onset of labor pains, she grabbed hold of the branches of a shade tree and gave birth to Siddharta Gautama, the future Buddha. The Buddha is said to have announced, "This is my final rebirth" as he entered the world. Buddhist tradition also has it that he walked immediately after his birth and took seven steps, under each of which a lotus flower bloomed. In 249 BC, the Buddhist convert Emperor Ashoka visited Lumbini and constructed four stupas and a stone pillar. Ashoka's Pillar bears an inscription that translates as: "King Piyadasi (Ashoka), beloved of devas, in the 20 year of the coronation, himself made a royal visit, Buddha Sakyamuni having been born here, a stone railing was built and a stone pillar erected to the Bhagavan ["blessed one"] having been born here. Lumbini village was taxed reduced and entitled to the eight (8) part (only)".

== Master plan ==
The United Nations Development Programme contributed nearly one million dollars for preparation of a Master Plan for the development of Lumbini, including numerous engineering and archaeological studies. The plan, which was completed in 1978, has as its objective to restore an area of about 7.7 km^{2}, to be known as the Lumbini Garden, centering on the garden and the Ashoka Pillar, with an additional area of 64.5 km^{2} to be developed in its support.

Within the plan for the development of Lumbini Garden, there are three main components: 1. New Lumbini Village 2. The Cultural Centre/Monastic Zone 3. The Sacred Garden The design is oriented north-south, with Lumbini Village and Cultural Centre north, and the focus of the design – the Sacred Garden – to the. south. On either side of the axis towards its southern end are the monastic enclaves. The entire development is tied together by a central link consisting of a walkway and a canal. This central link establishes the solitude and sanctity of the Sacred Garden, with its pillar and spectacular panorama of the Himalaya, and offers pilgrims time and space to prepare themselves as they approach the Sacred Garden.
