= Malina Joshi =

Nepalese actress and beauty pageant titleholder (born 1989)

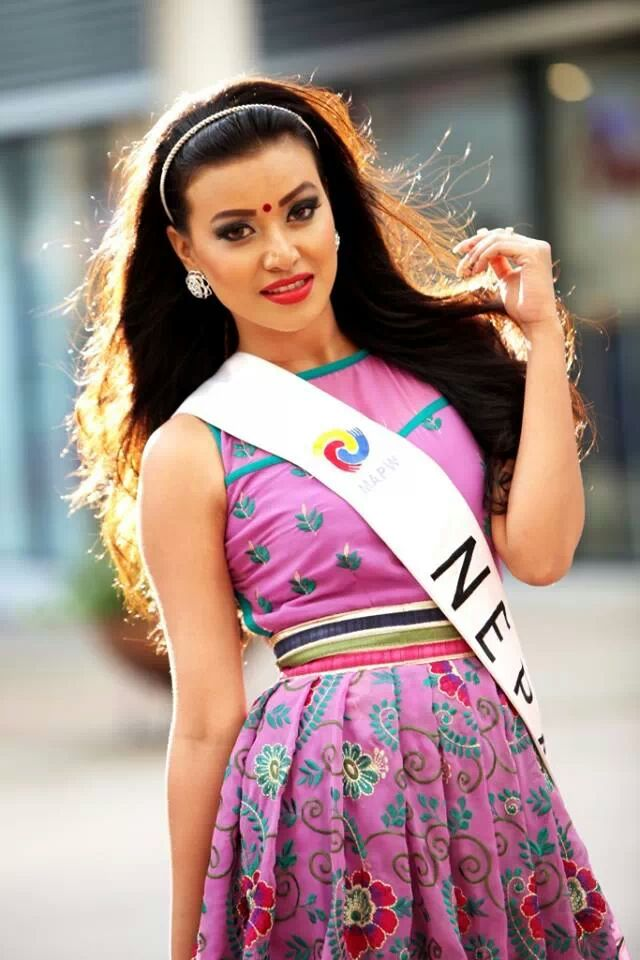
- Joshi in 2014
- Born: Malina Joshi; January 27, 1989 (age 37); Dharan, Nepal
- Height: 1.72 m (5 ft 8 in)
- Beauty pageant titleholder
- Title: Miss Nepal 2011
- Hair color: Brown
- Eye color: Dark brown
- Major competitions: Miss Asia Pacific World 2013 (top 15); Miss World 2011; Miss Nepal 2011 (winner); Miss Angel 2010 (top 5)

Malina Joshi (Nepali: मलिना जोशी) (born 27 January 1989) is a Nepalese actress and beauty pageant titleholder who was crowned Miss Nepal 2011. She represented Nepal at the Miss World 2011 pageant which was held in London on 4 November 2011. She was selected to perform Nepalese folk dance on the final day of the competition. She was placed among the top-30 in the "Beauty with a Purpose" title, a major award at Miss World.

== Life ==
She finished her secondary education from Dharan Higher Secondary School and successfully achieved her MBA degree specialized in Marketing from Ace Institute of Management.

She was also among the top five finalists in Miss Angel 2010 contest. Although she did not win, she attained the Miss Intellect title award.

She also participated in Miss Asia Pacific world in 2013 where she ended as one of the 15 semi-finalists in the pageant held in Seoul, Korea.

== Filmography ==
Key
†	Denotes films that have not yet been released

Year	Film	Role	Notes
2014	Ritu		Debut film
2016	The Winner (2016)		
2016	Jhumkee		Playing role of Tharu Women
2017	Rani		
2018	Timi Hunchhau Jaha Jaha		
2023	Chhakka Panja 4		

Awards and achievements
Preceded by Sadichha Shrestha	Miss Nepal World; 2011	Succeeded by Shristi Shrestha
