= Ritu (2014 film) =

- Ritu Nepali Movie Poster
- Nepali: ऋतु
- Directed by: Manoj Adhikari
- Written by: Sandeep Badal
- Starring: Raj Ballav Koirala; Malina Joshi; Reema Bishwokarma
- Cinematography: Sushan Prajapati
- Edited by: Bharat Regmi
- Music by: Hemanta Rana; Tsujil Karmacharya
- Production companies: Apil Bista Film Production; Alp Entertainment; Ashok Gautam Films
- Release date: 7 March 2014
- Running time: 129 minutes
- Country: Nepal
- Language: Nepali

Ritu is a 2014 Nepali romantic love story film that portrays the emotional behaviour of young lovers. Directed by Manoj Adhikari, Ritu is the first Nepali Film produced from Australia. The theme of the film is "Seasons change with time, so do the hearts and feelings inside".

== Plot ==
Ritu is a simple romantic story about the similar changes that took place in the lives of Meena, Suraj and Kripa. Ritu analyses the relationships of its characters through time. It's not about falling in love, but about not letting your love wither and fall. Cast of the film are Raj Ballav Koirala, Malina Joshi, Rima Bishwokarma, Kamal Silwal, Bishnu Neupane, Iva Ivanova, Bulson, Mana Khatri, Sushila Budhathoki, Written By Sandeep Badal Produced By Alp Entertainment in Association with Planet3Films, Apil Bista Films and Ashok Gautam Films.

== Cast ==
- Raj Ballav Koirala
- Malina Joshi
- Reema Bishwokarma
- Riya Patil as Ritu
- Anubha Rastogi as Mother
- Sanjay Vishwakarma as Buyer
