= The Winner (2016 film) =

- Directed by: Hikmat Bista
- Screenplay by: Abhay Baral
- Story by: Mahesh Man Shrestha
- Produced by: Srijana Shah; Bikash Kharel
- Starring: Malina Joshi; Manchin Shakya; Mahesh Man Shrestha; Reshu Tamang; Rajkumar Pant; Royal Maskey; Amit Giri
- Music by: Amit Shrestha
- Production company: Diamond Star Films
- Release date: 4 November 2016 (Nepal)
- Country: Nepal
- Language: Nepalese

The Winner is a Nepali action based film released on 4 November 2016 directed by Hikmat Bista and produced by Srijana Shah and Bikash Kharel. The film features Malina Joshi, Manchin Shakya and Mahesh Man Shrestha in lead roles. Filmed in Nepal, Australia, Dubai, the first look of the film was released at Baishak 10. The film was released from 2 September 2016/ Bhadra 17 2073.

== Cast ==
- Malina Joshi
- Manchin Shakya
- Mahesh Man Shrestha
- Reshu Tamang
- Rajkumar Pant
- Royal Maskey
- Amit Giri
- Shaun. Anthony Robinson.
