= Lumbini =

Historical city in Lumbini Province, Nepal

Lumbini लुम्बिनी (Nepali)
- Ancient City
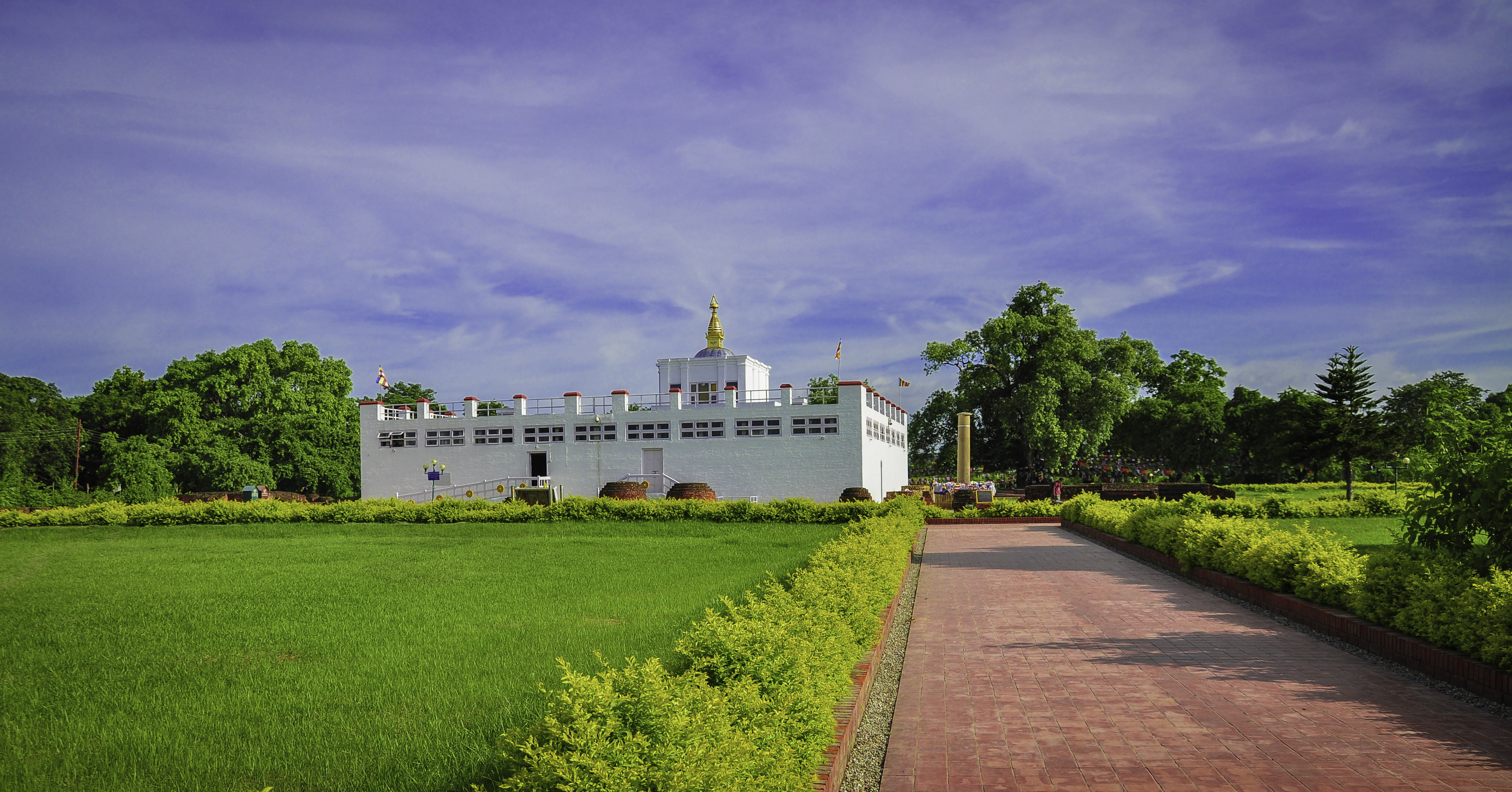
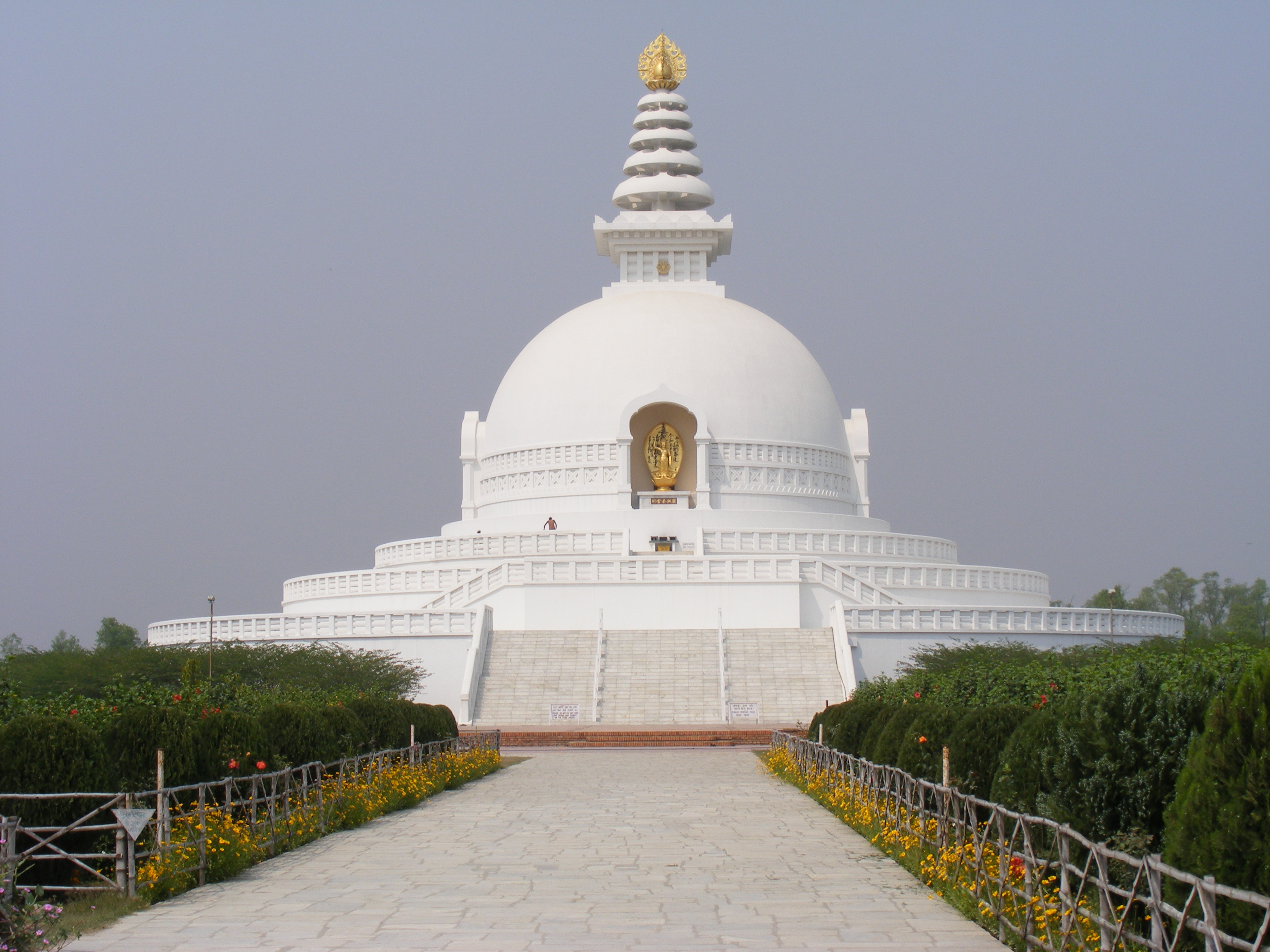
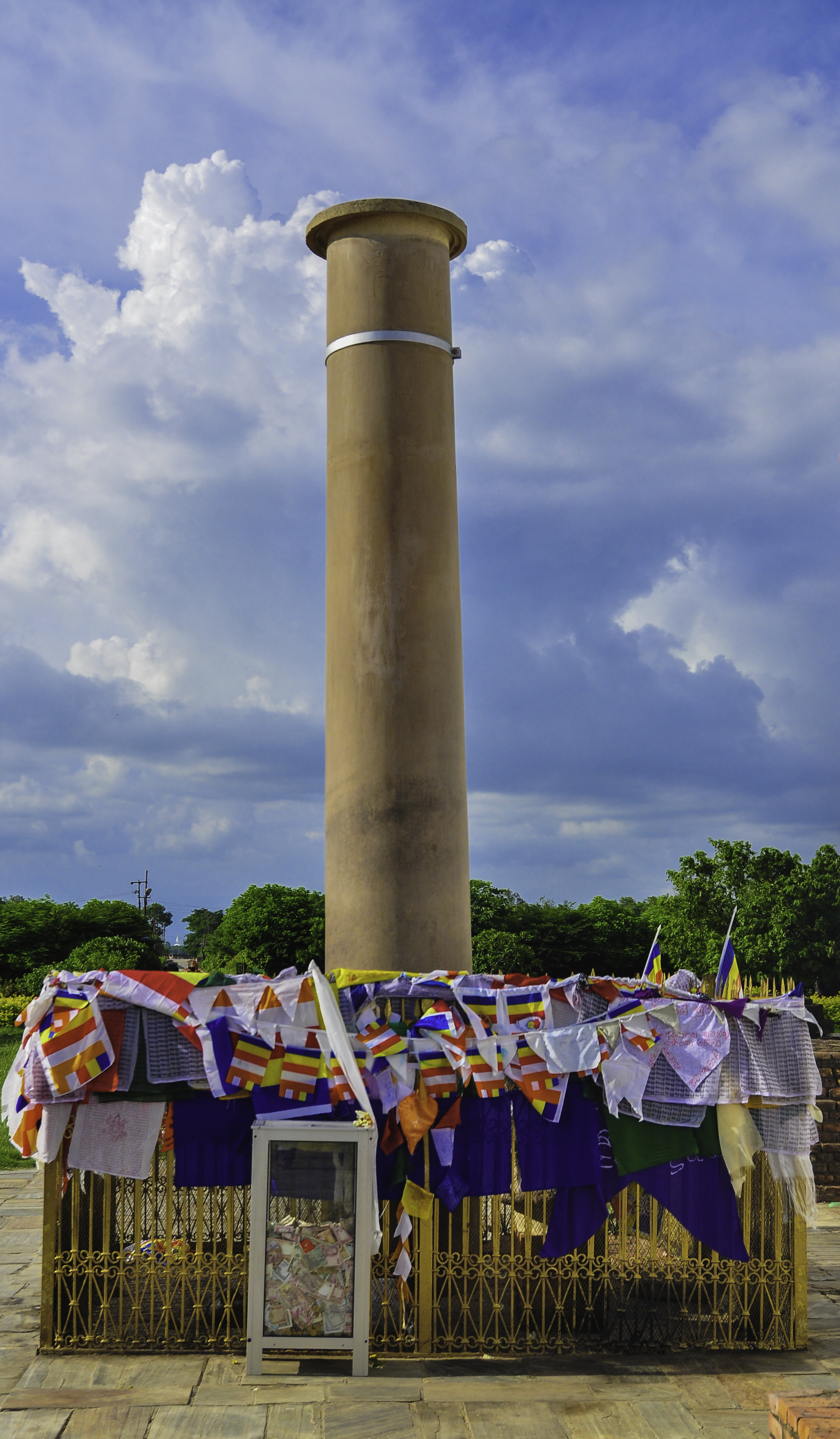
- From top to bottom Maya Devi Mandir, World Peace Pagoda and Ashoka Pillar

- Location of Lumbini in Nepal Lumbini (Nepal)
- Coordinates: 27°28′53″N 83°16′33″E
- Country: Nepal
- Province: Lumbini Province
- District: Rupandehi
- Municipality: Lumbini Sanskritik

Government
  - Type: Development trust
  - Body: Lumbini Development Trust
- Elevation: 150 m (490 ft)
- Time zone: UTC+05:45 (NST)
- Postal code: 32914
- Native Language: Bhojpuri
- Website: www.lumbinidevtrust.gov.np

UNESCO World Heritage Site
- Location: Rupandehi District, Nepal
- Criteria: Cultural: iii, vi
- Reference: 666
- Inscription: 1997 (21st Session)
- Area: 198.95 ha (491.6 acres)
- Buffer zone: 22.78 ha (56.3 acres)

Protected Ancient Monument
- Law: Ancient Monuments Preservation Act, 2013 (1956)
- ID: NP-RP-02

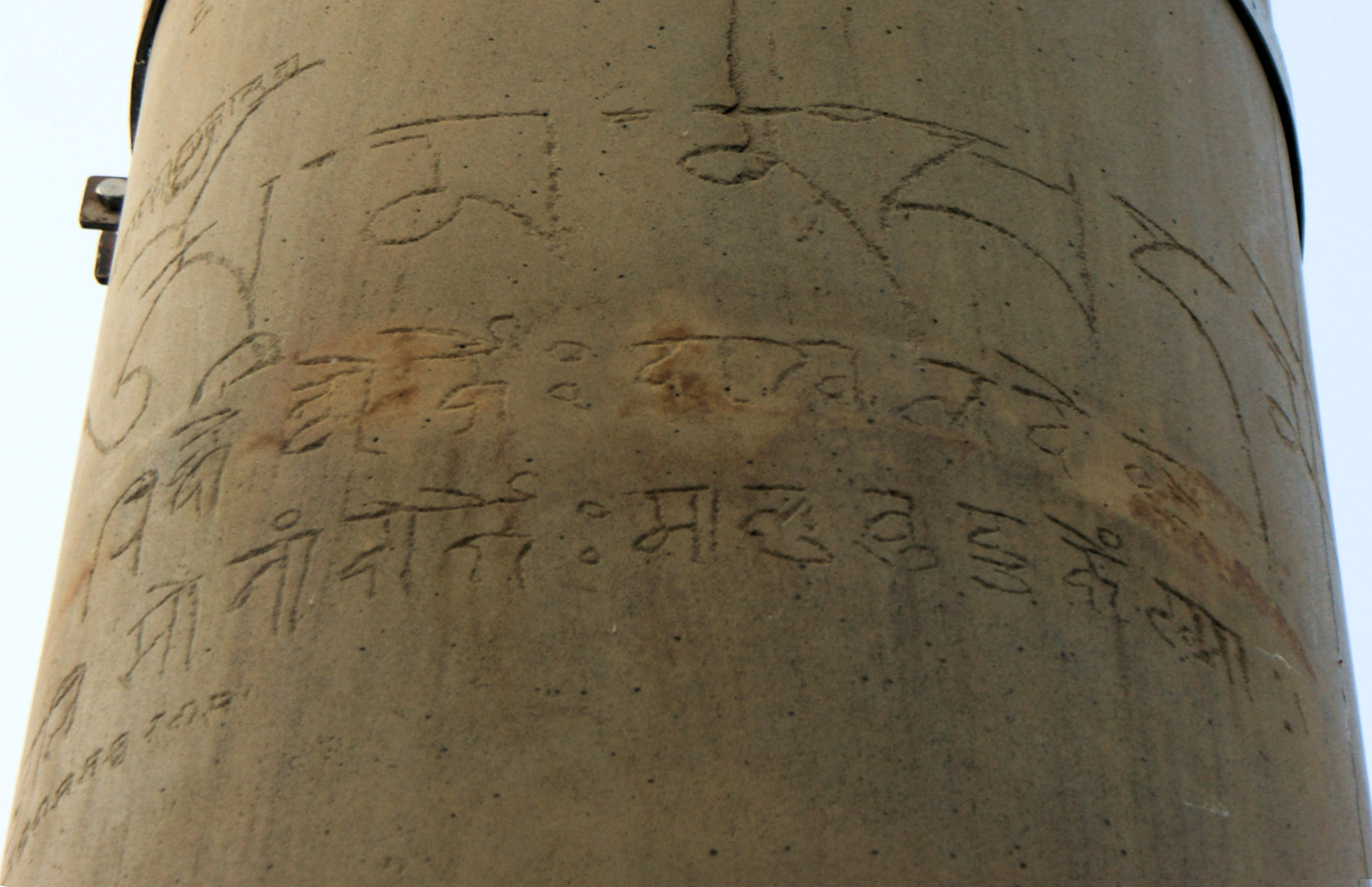
Lumbini pillar inscription by King Ripumalla: "Om Mani Padme Hum Sri Ripu Malla Chiram Jayatu 1234 Saka Era" ("Om Mani Padme Hum May Prince Ripu Malla be long victorious")

Map of Lumbini in relation to other Eight Great Places Buddhist pilgrimage sites and notable nearby cities

Lumbini (pronounced [/lʊmˈbiːni/], "the lovely" or "beautiful garden") is a Buddhist pilgrimage site in the Rupandehi District of Lumbini Province in Nepal. According to sacred texts and Buddhist commentaries, Queen Maya gave birth to Siddhartha Gautama, the Buddha, in Lumbini, c. 563 BCE. (Note: Joshua Mark, "World History Encyclopaedia", 2020: The dates of the Buddha['s life] have been derived from various chronologies which all recognize that Siddhartha Gautama lived for 80 years but disagree on the dates those 80 years encompass. The chronologies are: 1.) Sri Lanka's Long Chronology: c. 624 - c. 544 BCE (The Convention) 2.) Alternative Long Chronology: c. 567 - c. 487 BCE 3.) India's Short Chronology: c. 448 - c. 368 BCE 4.) Contemporary Chronology: c. 563 - c. 483 BCE) Lumbini is one of the four most sacred pilgrimage sites pivotal in the life of the Buddha.

Lumbini has a number of old temples, including the Mayadevi Temple, and several new temples funded by Buddhist organizations from various countries, a few of which are still under construction. Monuments, monasteries, stupas, a museum, and the Lumbini International Research Institute are also near to the holy site. There is a puskarini, or holy pond, where Mayadevi, the Buddha's mother, is believed to have taken ritual cleansing prior to his birth, and where he was first bathed. At other sites near Lumbini, earlier Buddhas were born, achieved ultimate Enlightenment and finally relinquished their earthly forms.

Lumbini was made a World Heritage Site by UNESCO in 1997. (Note: Buddhist scriptures and travel accounts of Chinese monks, Faxian and Xuanzang, describe relative location of cities Lumbini, Sravasti, Kapilavastu and Rajgir. Based on these data, recent work has used geometrical methods to pin-point the location of Lumbini. The results indicate that Kapilavastu and Lumbini were located to the south of Rajgir. Out of two historical Kosala's, South Koshala was located to the south of Rajgir. The results reject North Kosala as Gautama Buddha's native country.)

== In Buddha's time ==
In the time of the Buddha, Lumbini was situated east of Kapilavastu and south-west of Devadaha of Shakya, an oligarchic republic. According to the Buddhist tradition, it was there that the Buddha was born. The Ashoka Pillar of Lumbini, a monolithic column with a Brahmi script inscription discovered at Rupandehi in 1896, is believed to mark the spot of Ashoka's visit to Lumbini. The site was not known as Lumbini before the pillar was discovered. The translation of inscription (by Paranavitana) reads:

When King Devanampriya Priyadarsin had been anointed twenty years, he came himself and worshipped (this spot), because the Buddha Shakyamuni was born here. (He) both caused to be made a stone bearing a horse and caused a stone pillar to be set up, (in order to show) that the Blessed One was born here. (The King) made the village of Lumbini free of taxes, and paying (only) an eighth share (of the produce). (Note: Several alternative translations have been published.)

The park was previously known as Rupandehi, 2 mi (3.2 km) north of Bhagavanpura. The Sutta Nipáta (vs. 683) states that the Buddha was born in a village of the Sákyans in the Lumbineyya Janapada. The Buddha stayed in Lumbinívana during his visit to Devadaha and there preached the Devadaha Sutta.

== Pillar of Ashoka ==
In 1896, former Nepalese Army General Khadga Shamsher Jang Bahadur Rana and Alois Anton Führer discovered a great stone pillar at Rupandehi. They used crucial historical records made by the famous Chinese monk-pilgrims Faxian (early 5th century CE), and Xuanzang (7th century CE). A Brahmi inscription found on the pillar gives evidence that Ashoka, emperor of the Maurya Empire, visited Lumbini in the 3rd-century BCE and identified it as the birth-place of the Buddha.

At the top of the pillar, there is a second inscription by King Ripumalla (1234 Saka Era, 13-14th century CE):

Om mani padme hum! May Prince Ripu Malla be long victorious, 1234

A second pillar of Ashoka is located about 22 kilometers to the northwest of Lumbini, the Nigali Sagar pillar (with inscription), and a third one 24 kilometers to the west, the Gotihawa pillar (without inscription).

== Lumbini complex ==
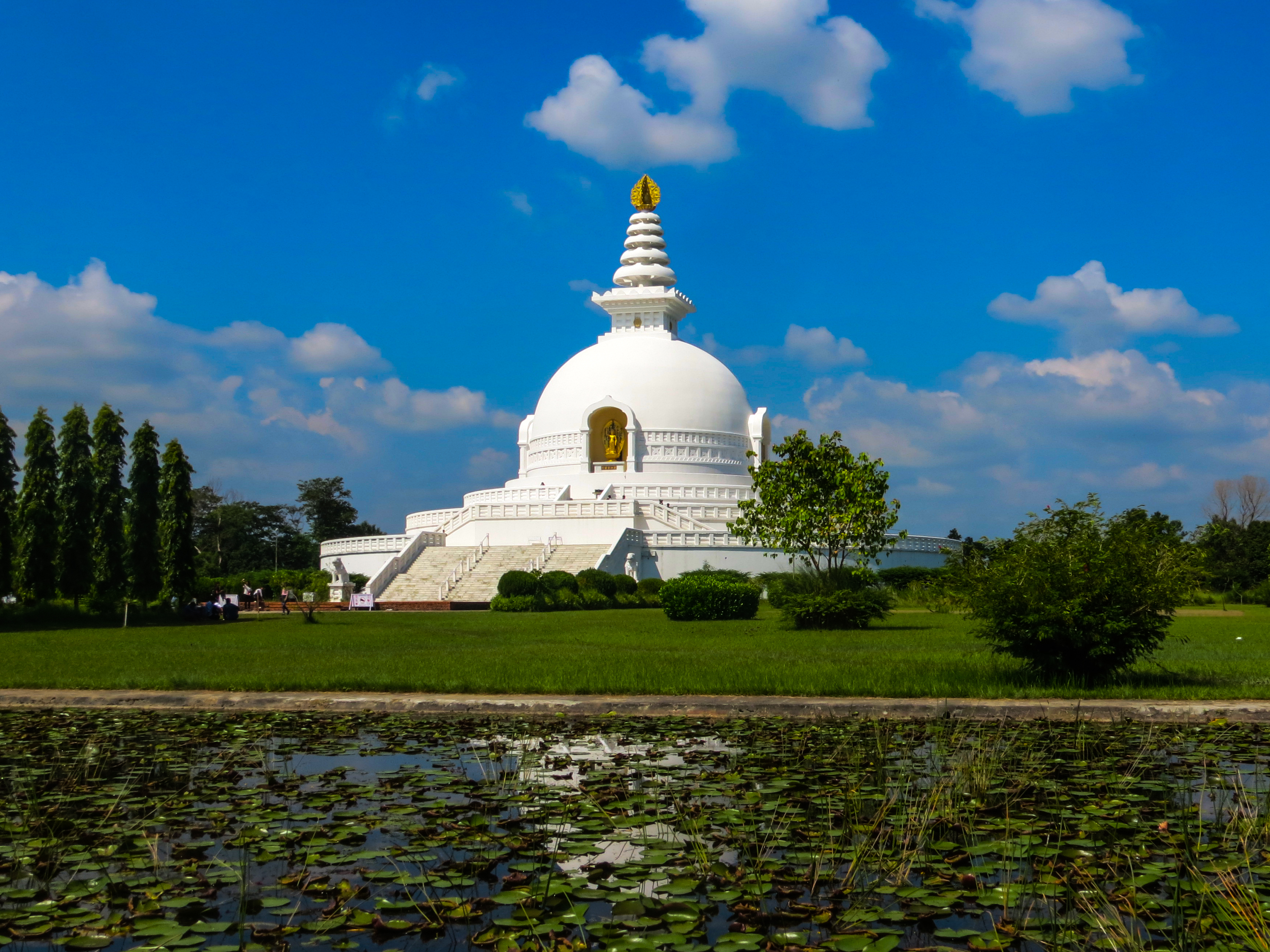
World Peace Pagoda in Lumbini

Lumbini is 4.8 km (3 mi) in length and 1.6 km (1.0 mi) in width. The holy site is bordered by a large monastic zone in which only monasteries can be built: no shops, hotels or restaurants are permitted. The complex is separated into an eastern and western monastic zone, with the eastern having the Theravadin monasteries, and the western holding Mahayana and Vajrayana monasteries. There is a long water filled canal separating the western and eastern zones, with a series of brick arch bridges joining the two sides along the length. The canal is serviced by simple outboard motor boats at the north end which provides tours. The holy site of Lumbini has ruins of ancient monasteries, a sacred Bodhi tree, an ancient bathing pond, the Ashokan pillar and the Mayadevi Temple, a site traditionally considered to be the birthplace of the Buddha. From early morning to early evening, pilgrims from various countries perform chanting and meditation at the site.

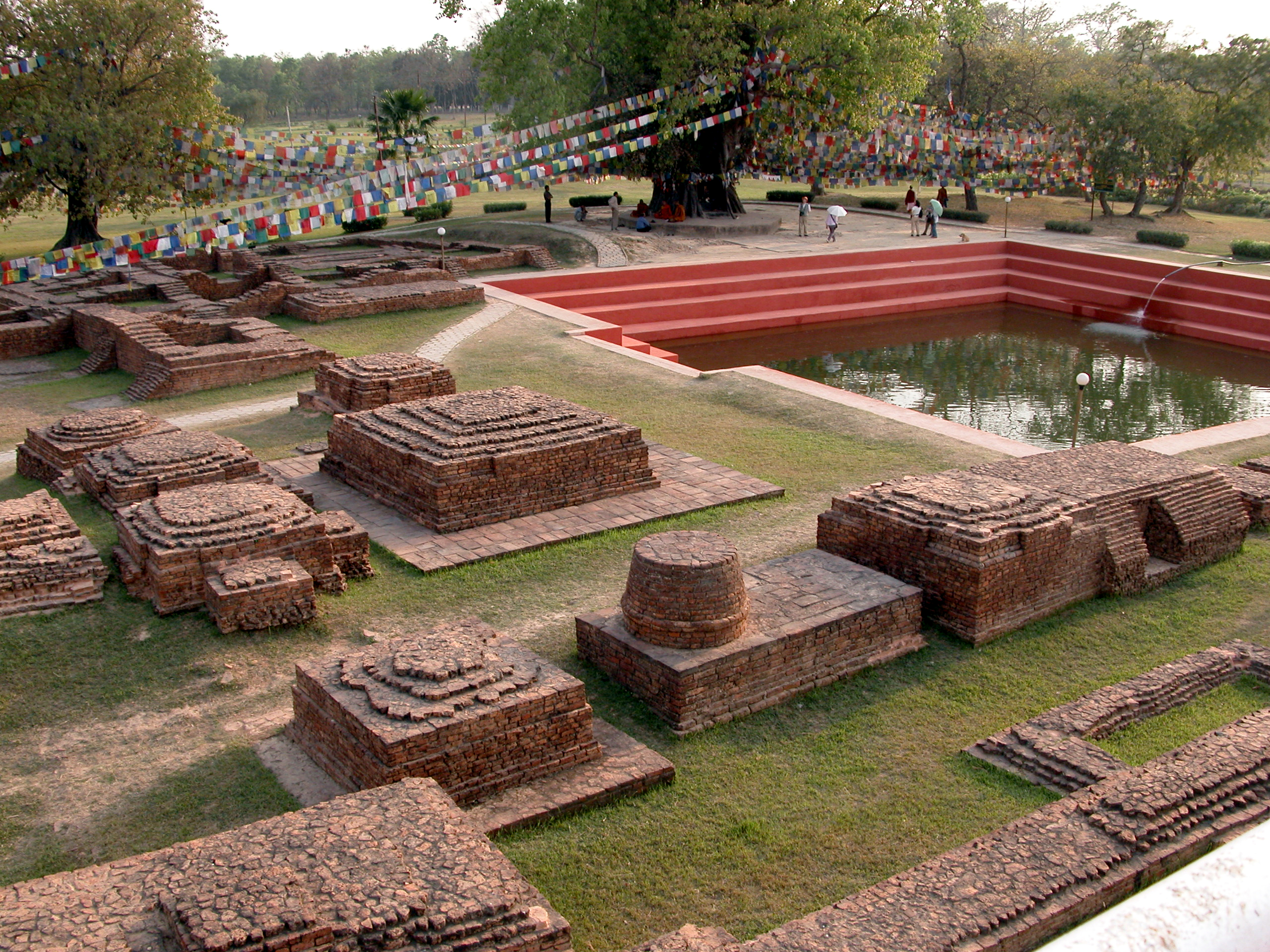
Ancient ruins at Lumbini

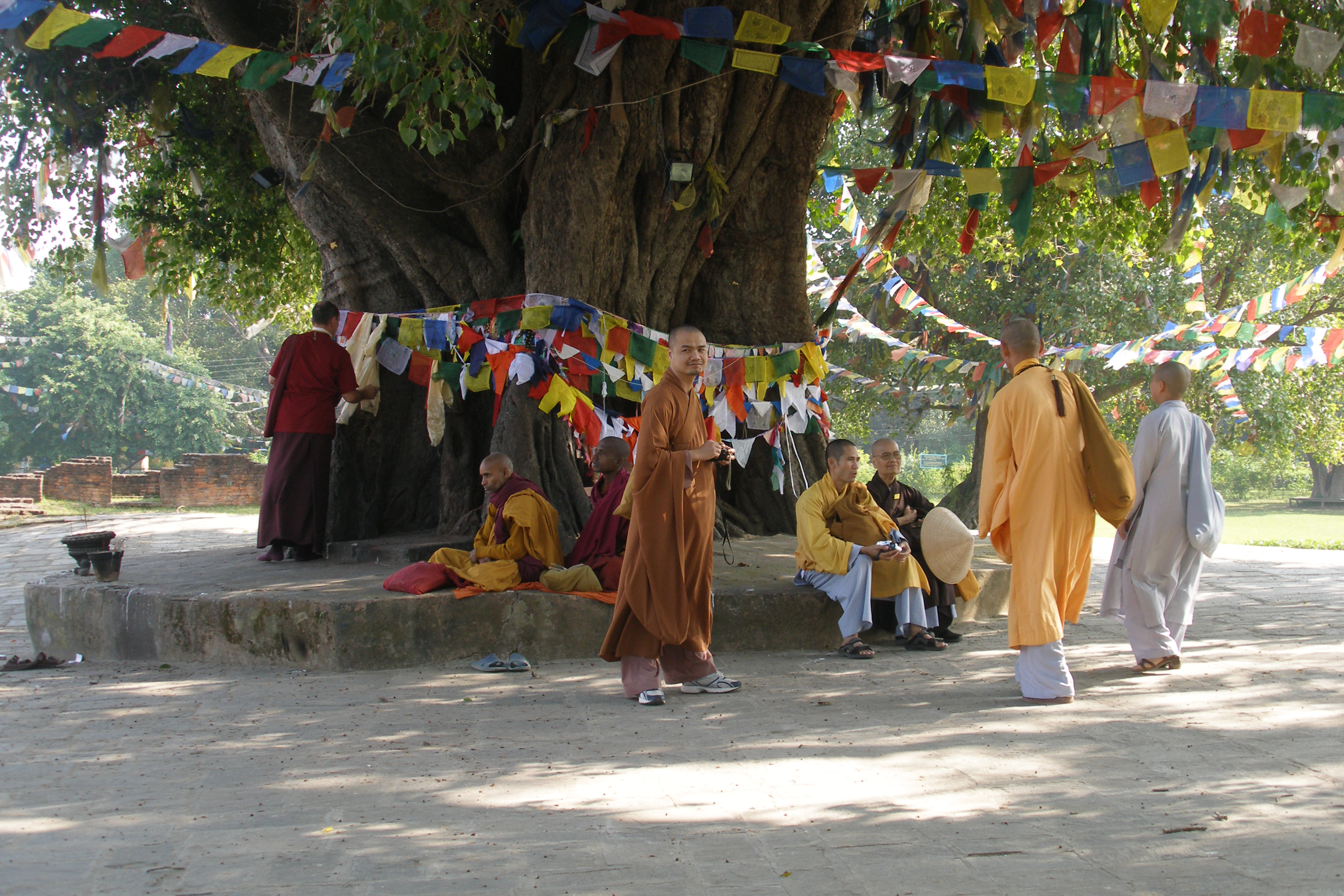
Bodhi tree

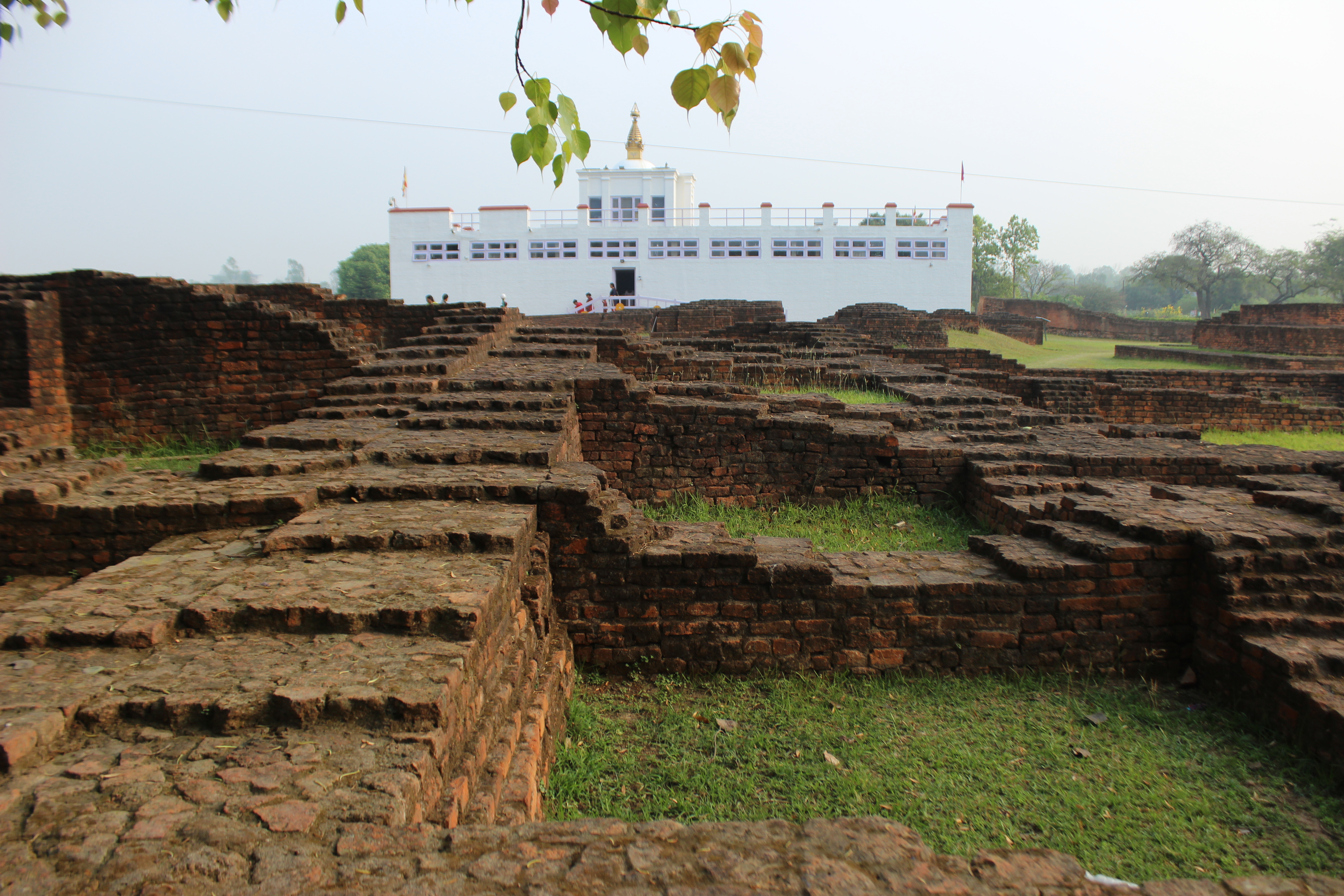
Mayadevi Temple and ruins of ancient monasteries

Lumbini complex is divided into three areas: the Sacred Garden, the Monastic Zone and the Cultural Center and New Lumbini Village. The Sacred Garden remains the epicenter of the Lumbini area and consists of the birthplace of Buddha and other monuments of archaeological and spiritual importance such as the Mayadevi Temple, the Ashoka Pillar, the Marker Stone, the Nativity Sculpture, Puskarini Sacred Pond and other structural ruins of Buddhist stupas and viharas. The Monastic Zone, spanning an area of one square mile is divided into two zones: the East Monastic Zone which represents Theravada school of Buddhism and the West Monastic Zone which represents Mahayana and Vajrayana school of Buddhism, with their respective monasteries on the either side of a long pedestrian walkway and canal. Marking the monastic spot as a sacred pilgrimage site, many countries have established Buddhist stupas and monasteries in the monastic zone with their unique historical, cultural and spiritual designs. The Cultural Center and New Lumbini Village comprises Lumbini Museum, Lumbini International Research Institute, World Peace Pagoda of Japan, Lumbini Crane Sanctuary and other administrative offices. In 2021, The Government of Bangladesh signed an agreement to construct a Buddhist monastery in Lumbini under the chairmanship of former premier of Bangladesh Sheikh Hasina with an intention of keeping a "symbol of Bangladesh at the birthplace of Lord Gautam Buddha". Similarly, in 2023, Russian Ambassador to Nepal Aleksei Novikov laid the foundation for the Russian Buddhist monastery in Lumbini to represent Russian Federation as well.

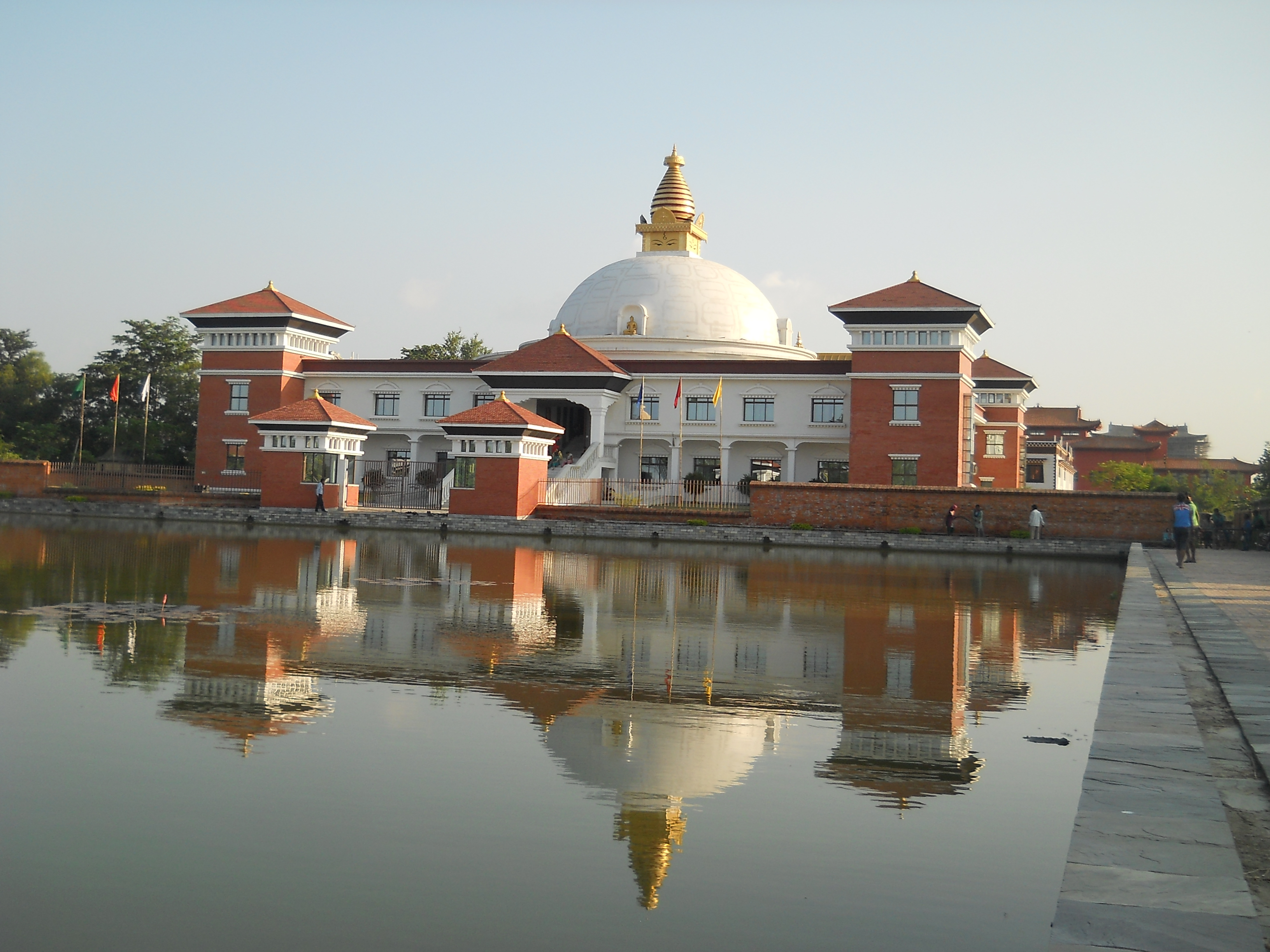
Nepalese Temple

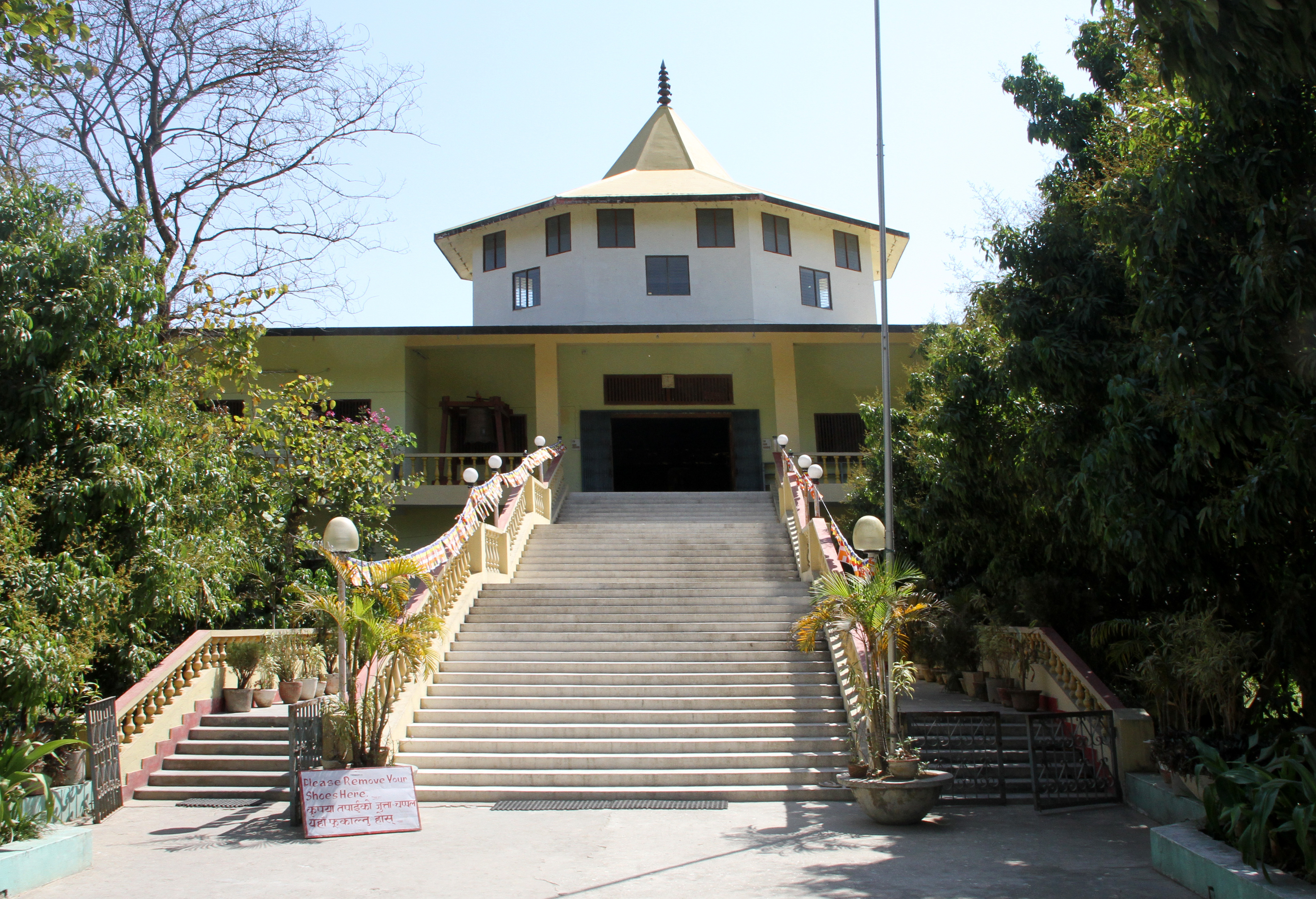
Indian Temple

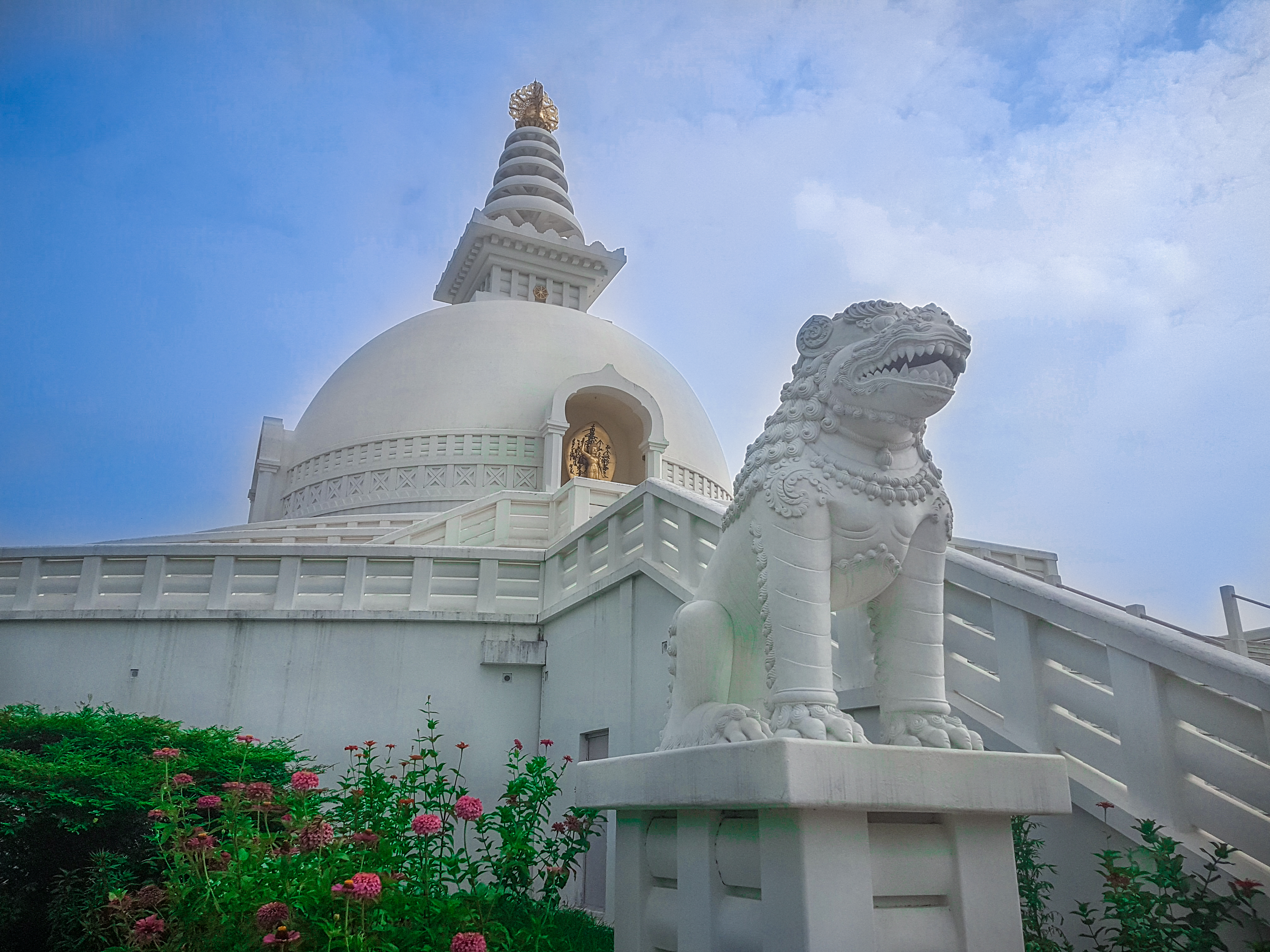
Japanese Stupa

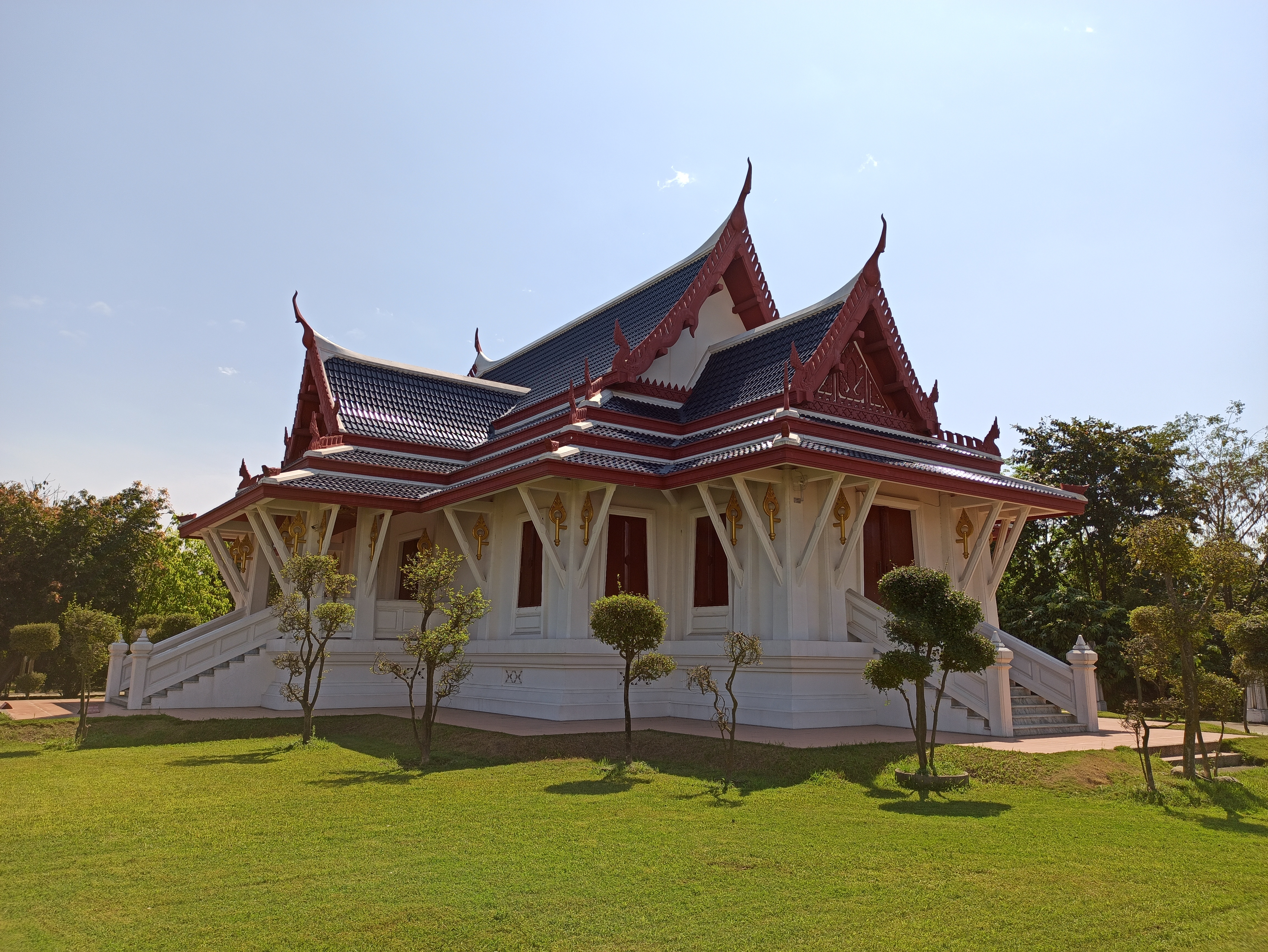
Royal Thailand Monastery

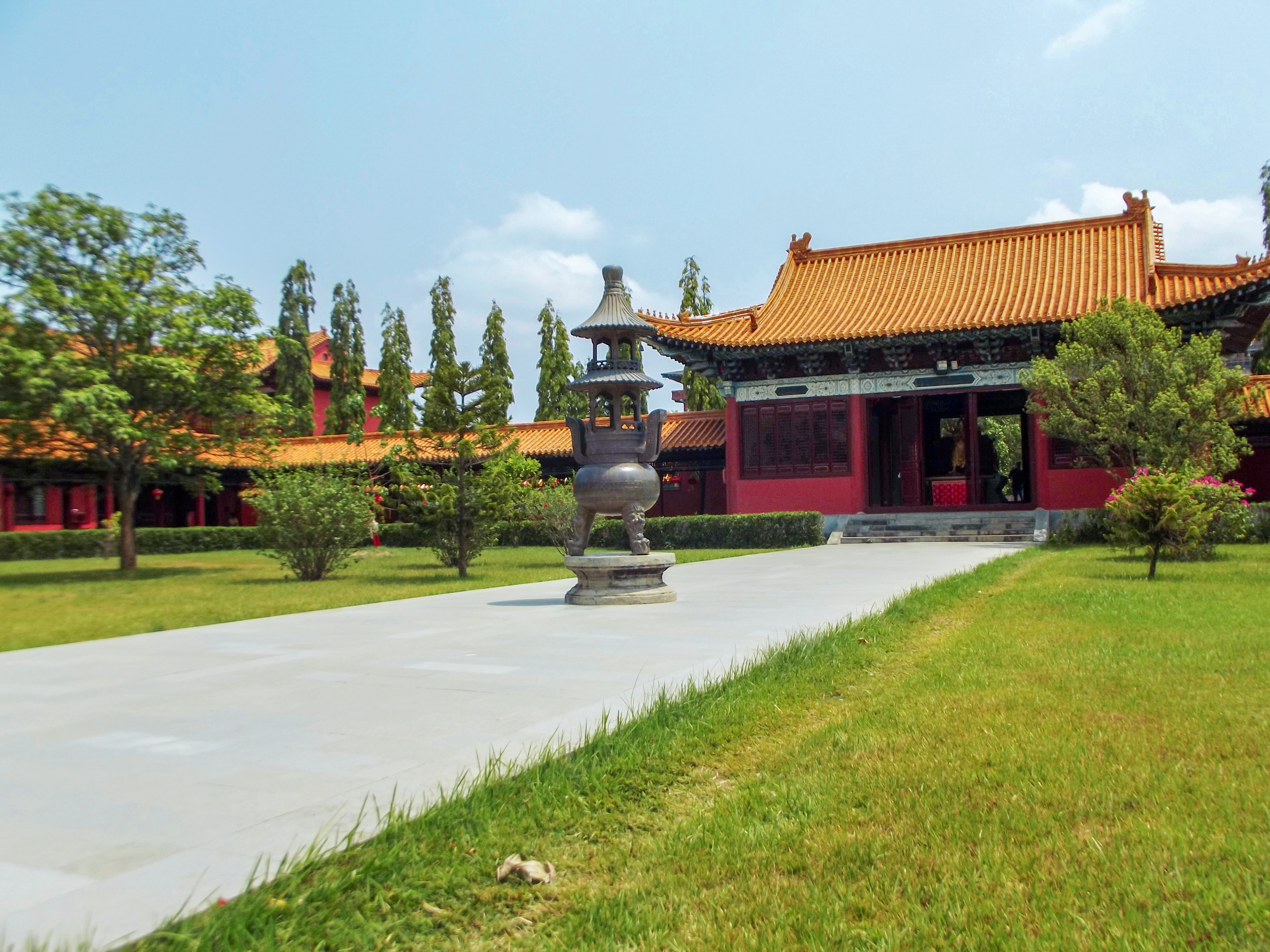
Chinese Monastery

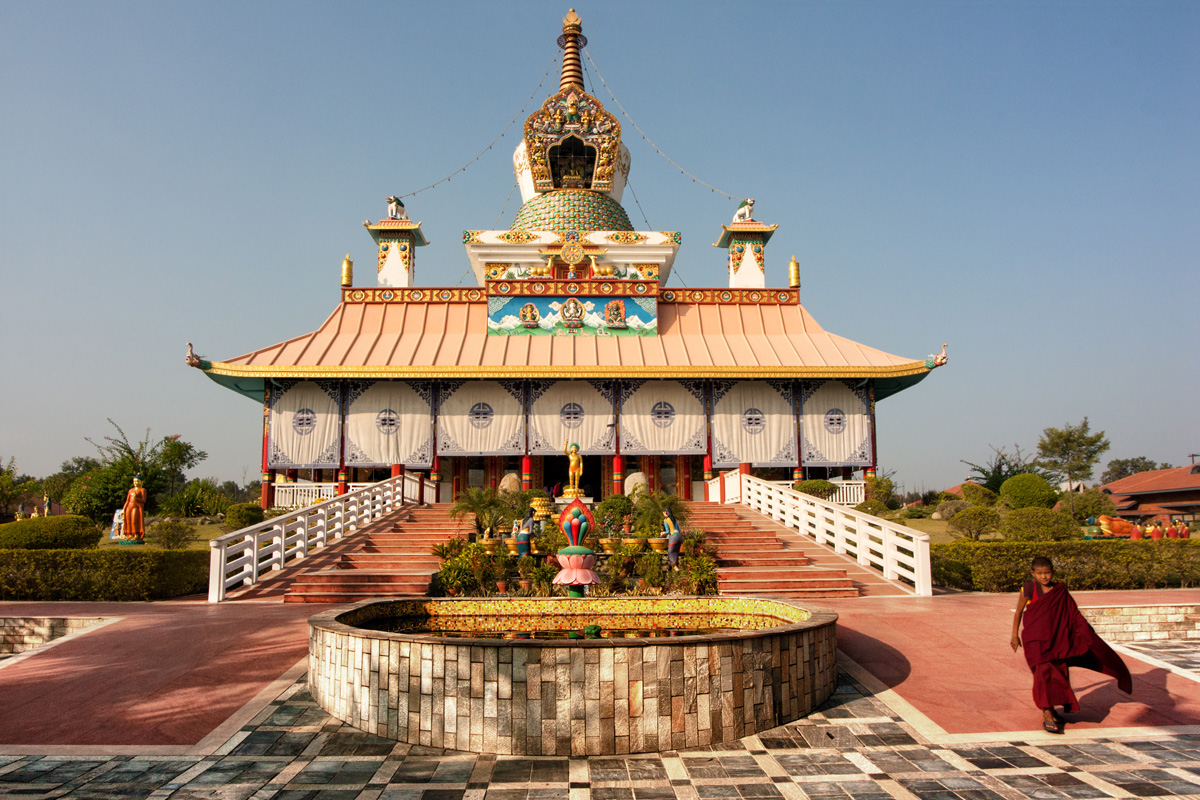
German Monastery

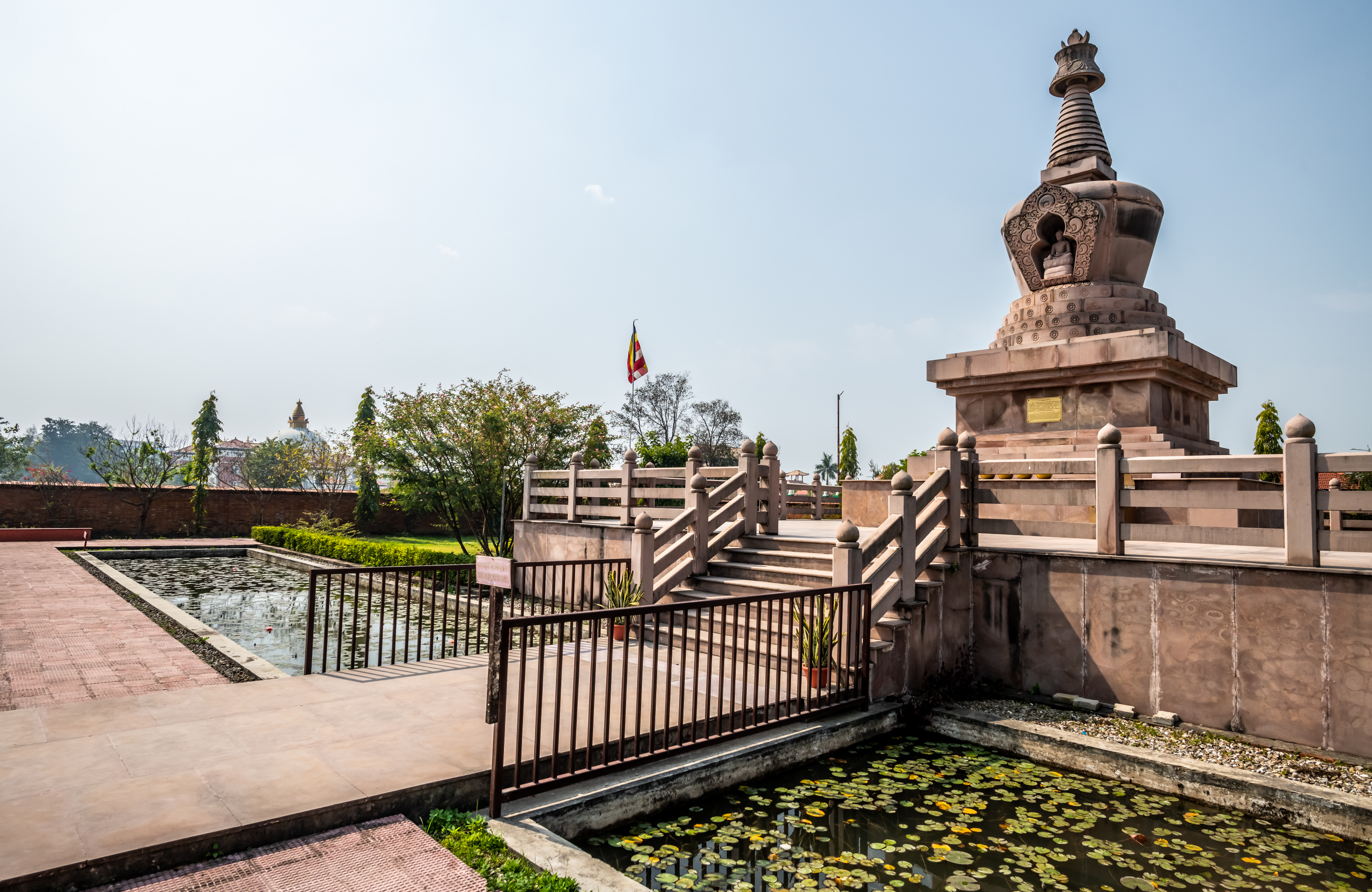
French Monastery

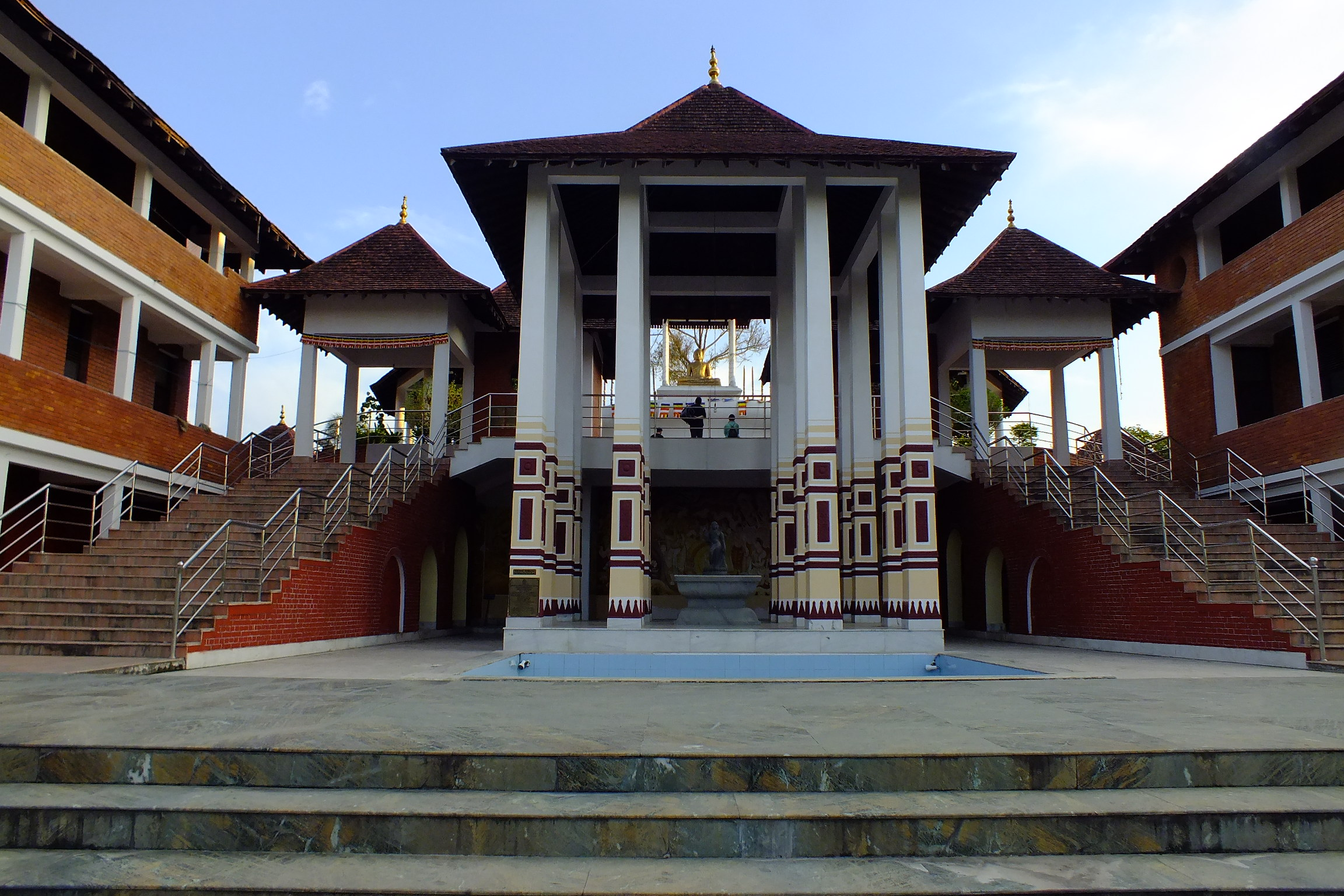
Sri Lankan Temple

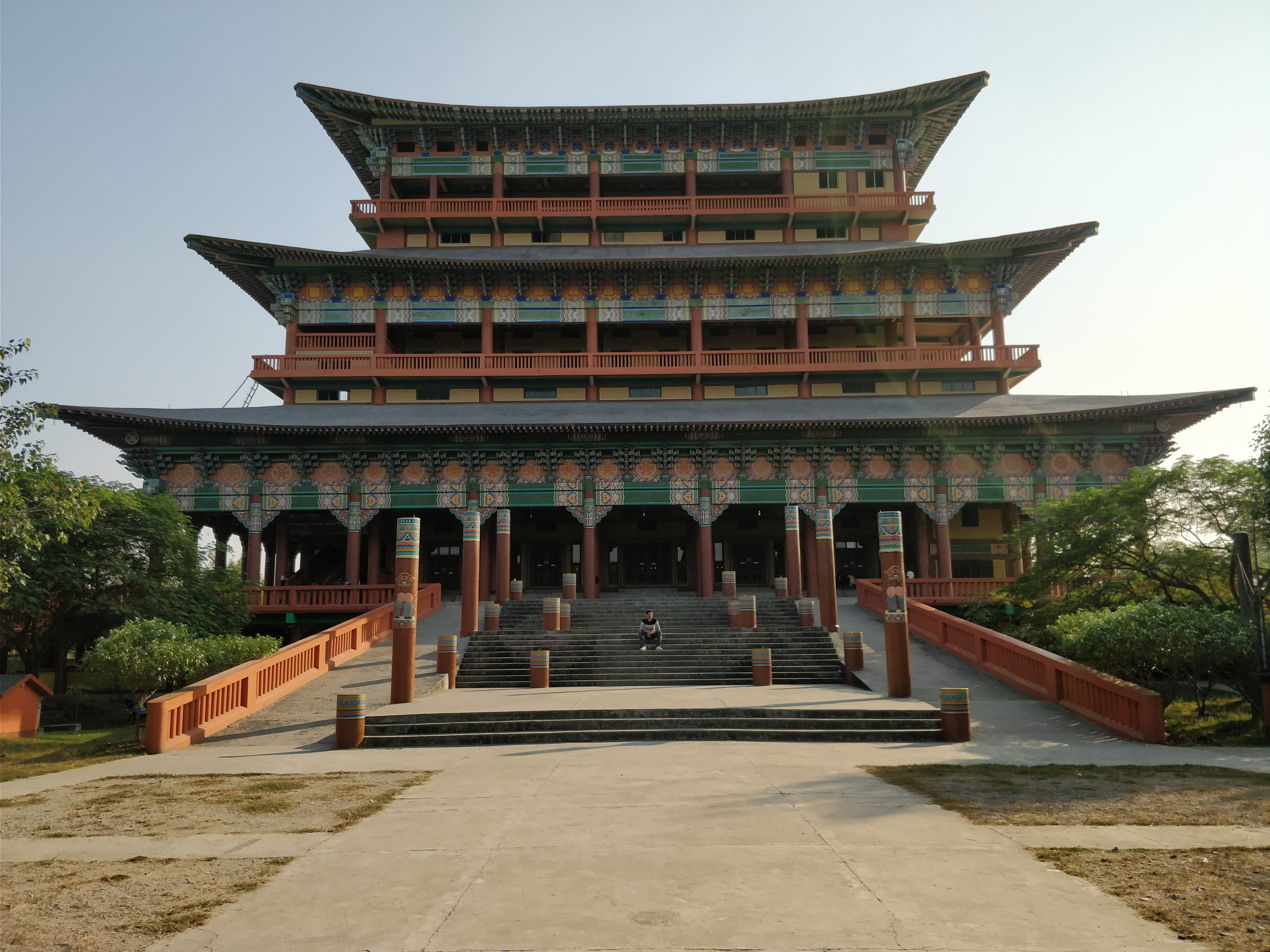
South Korean Temple

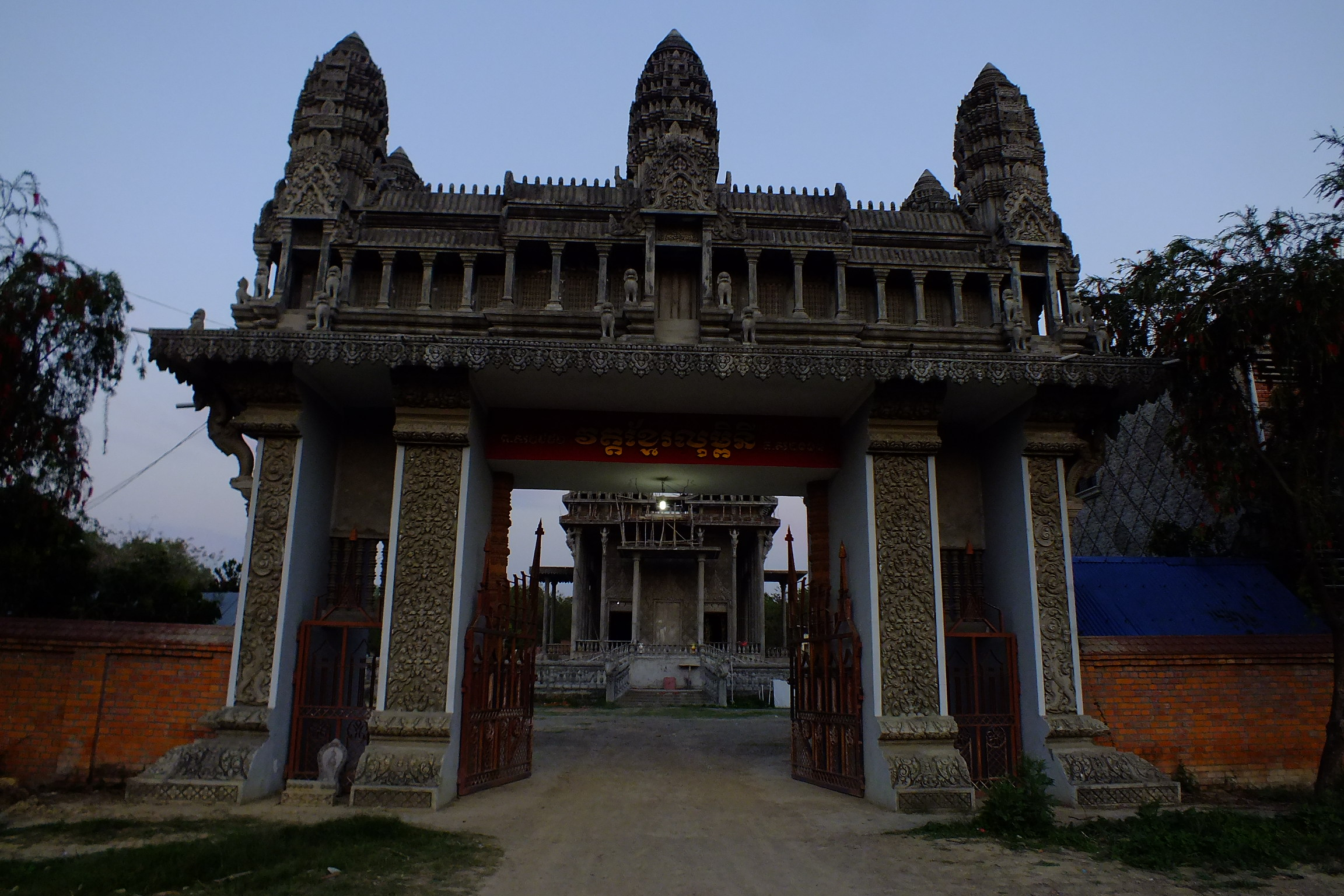
Cambodian Monastery

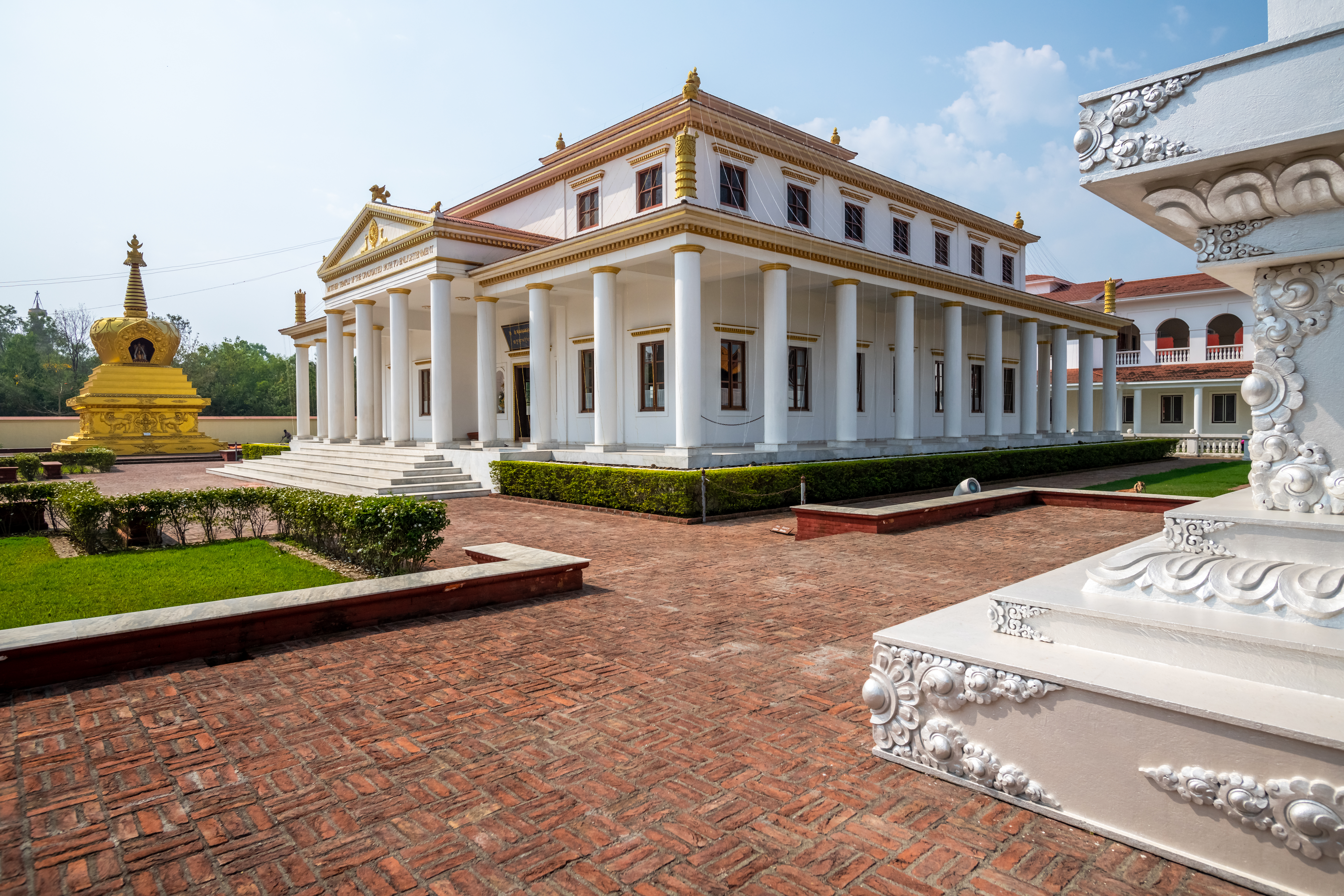
Austrian Monastery

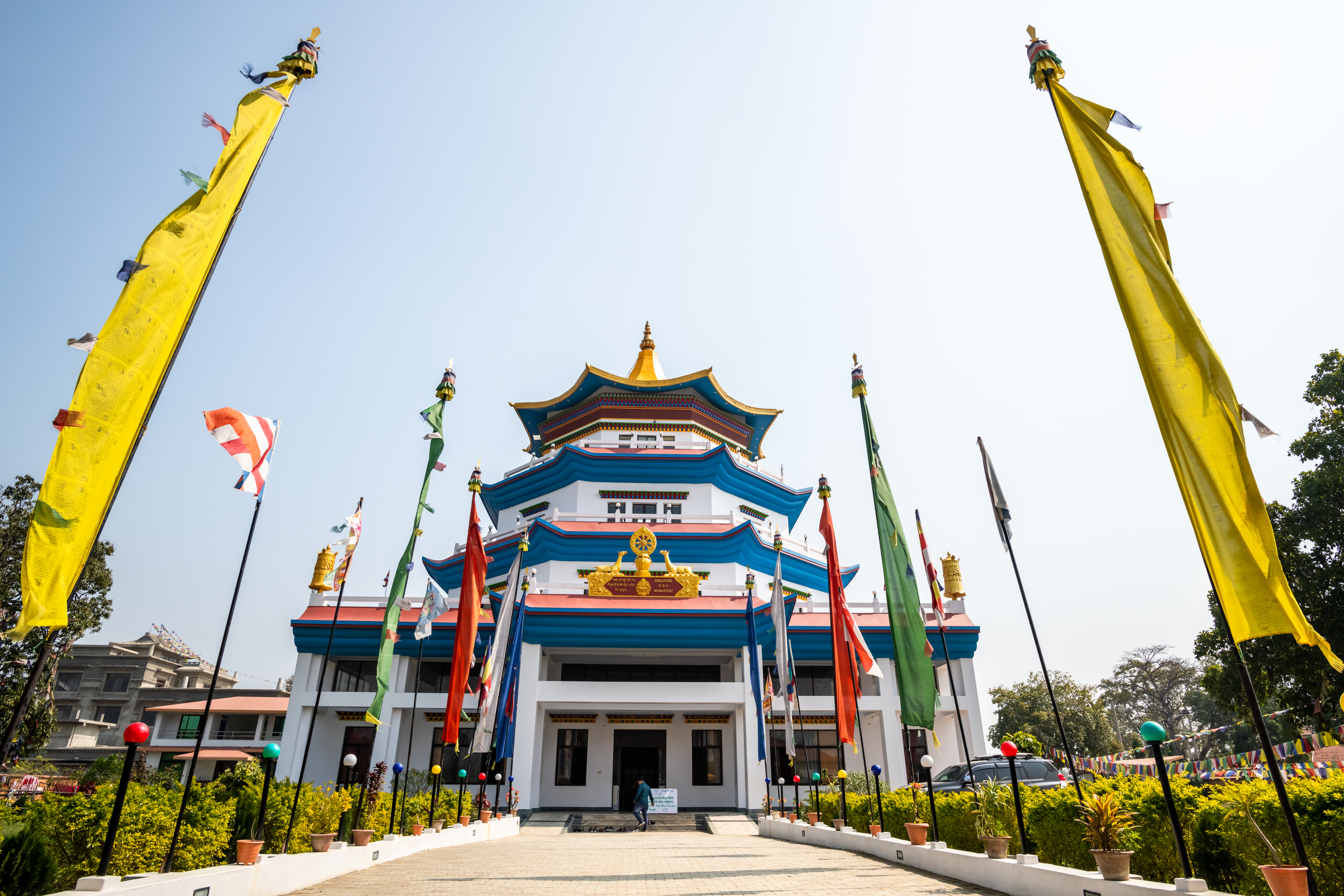
Singapore Monastery

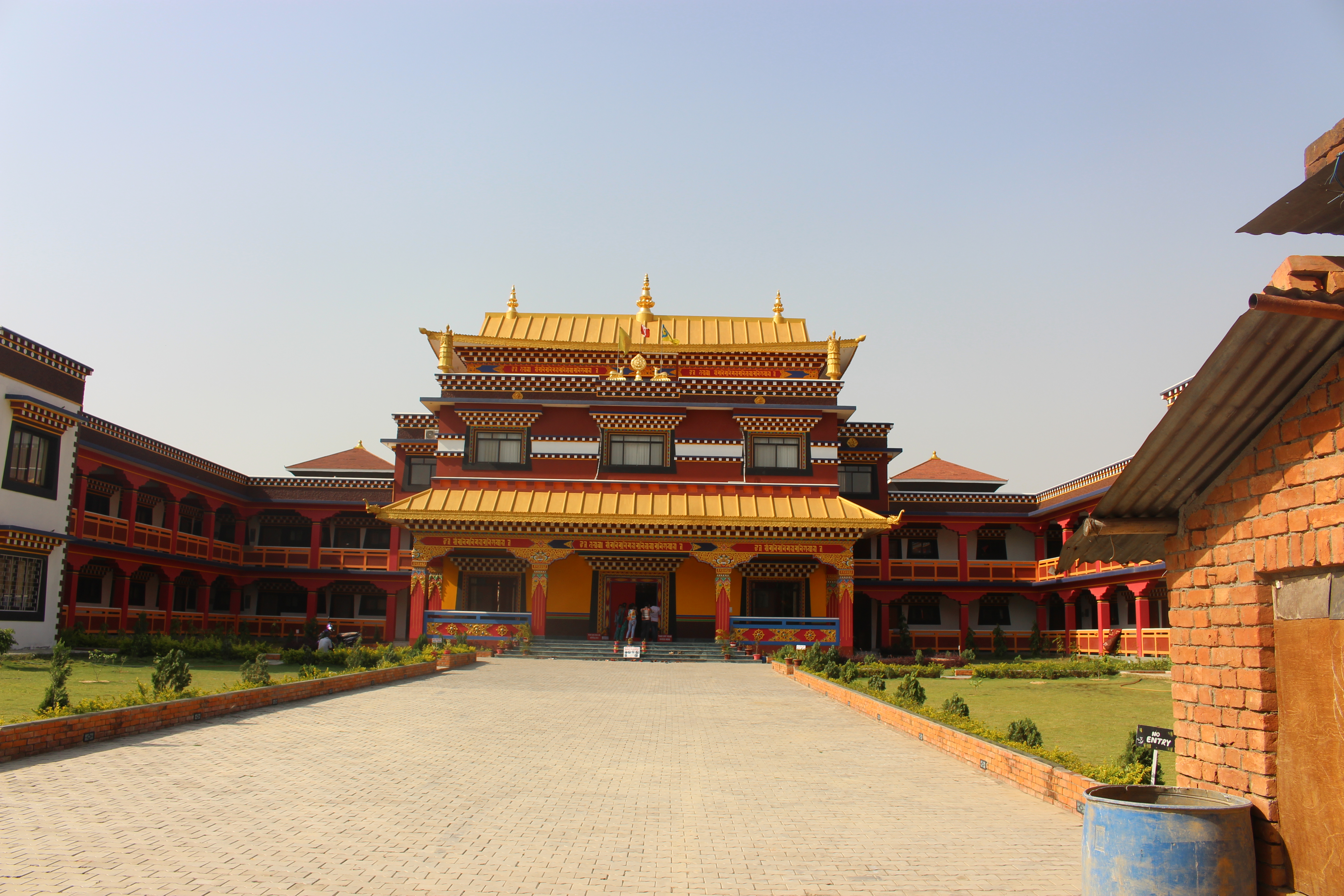
Canadian Temple

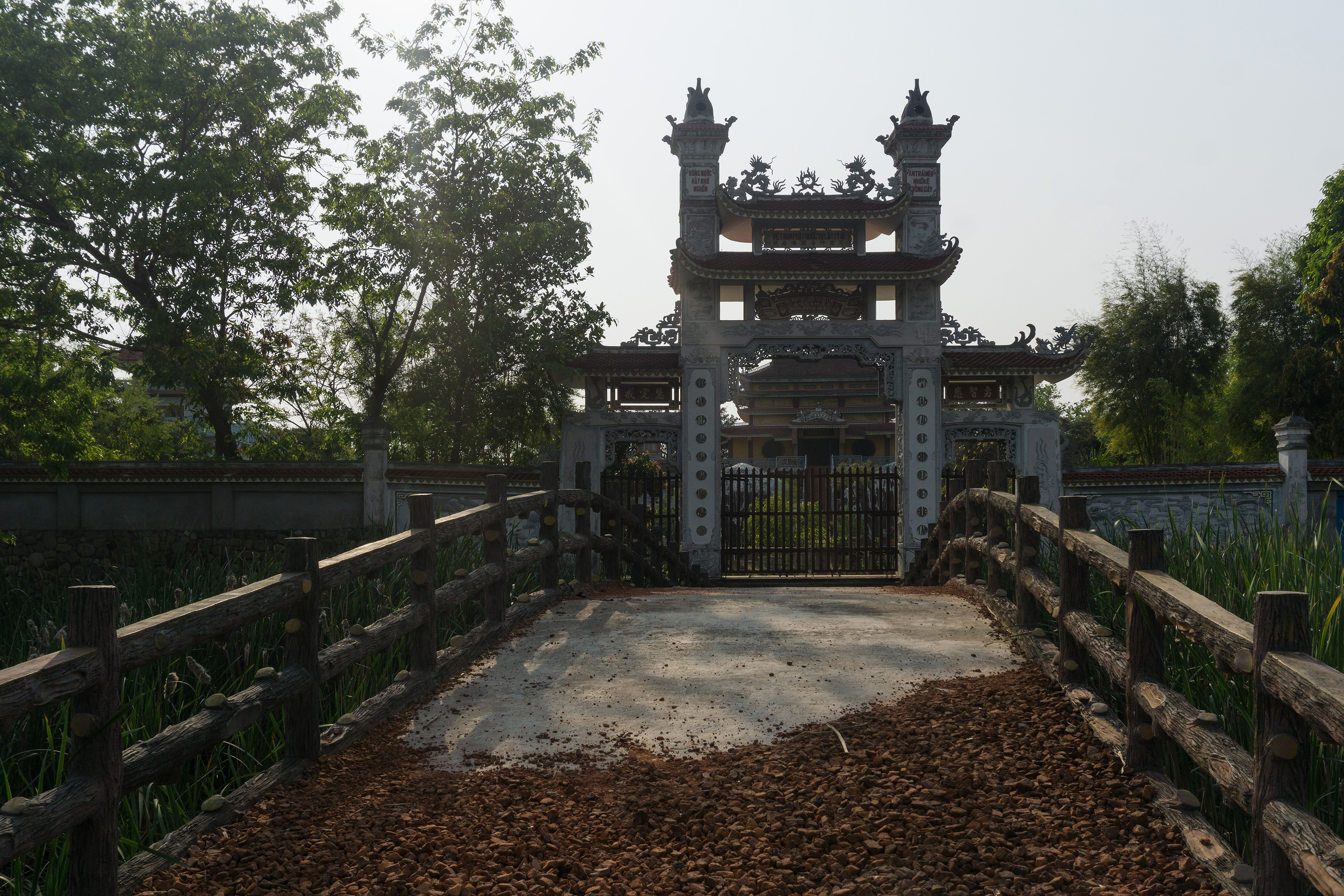
Vietnamese Temple

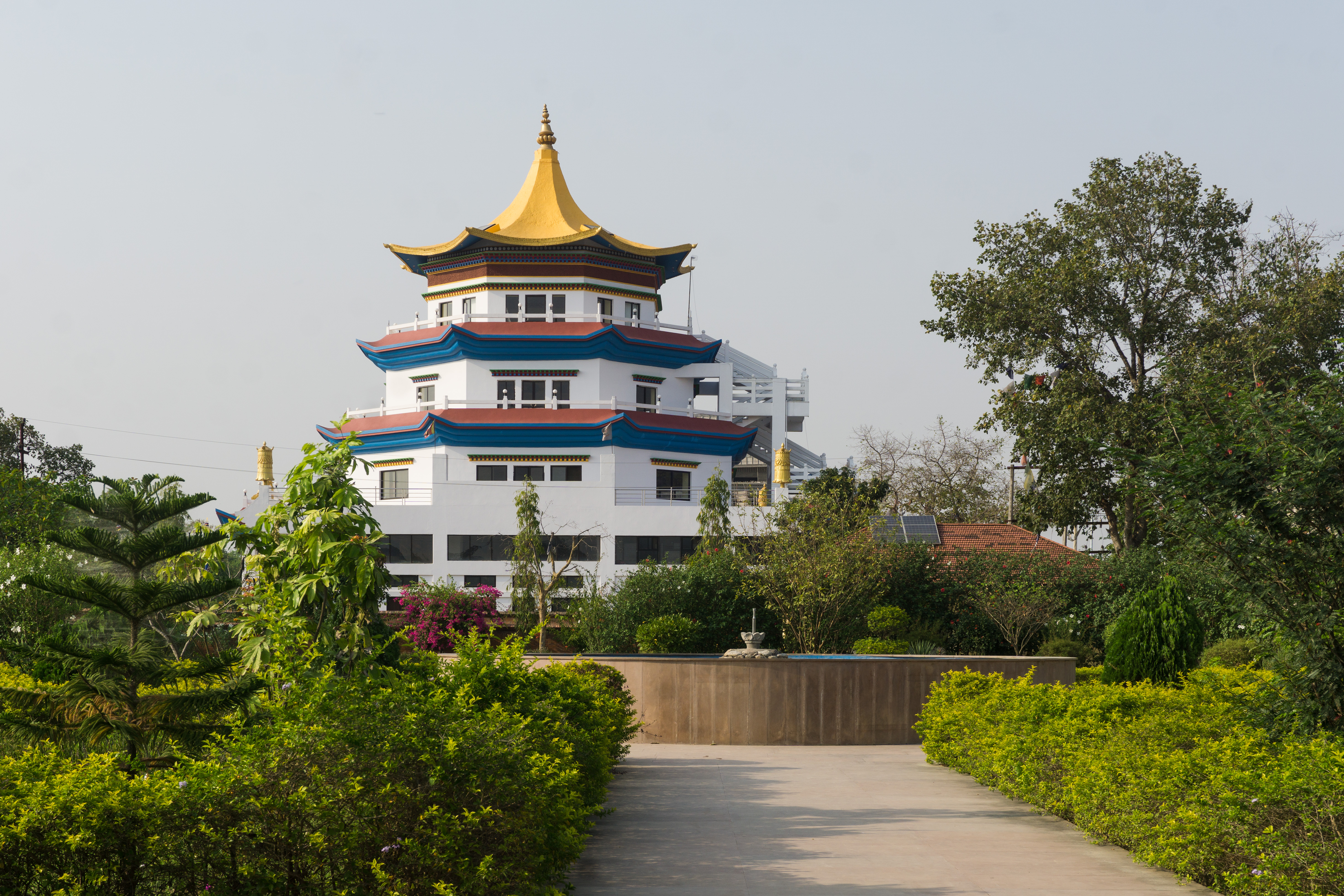
Urgen Dorjee Choling Centre

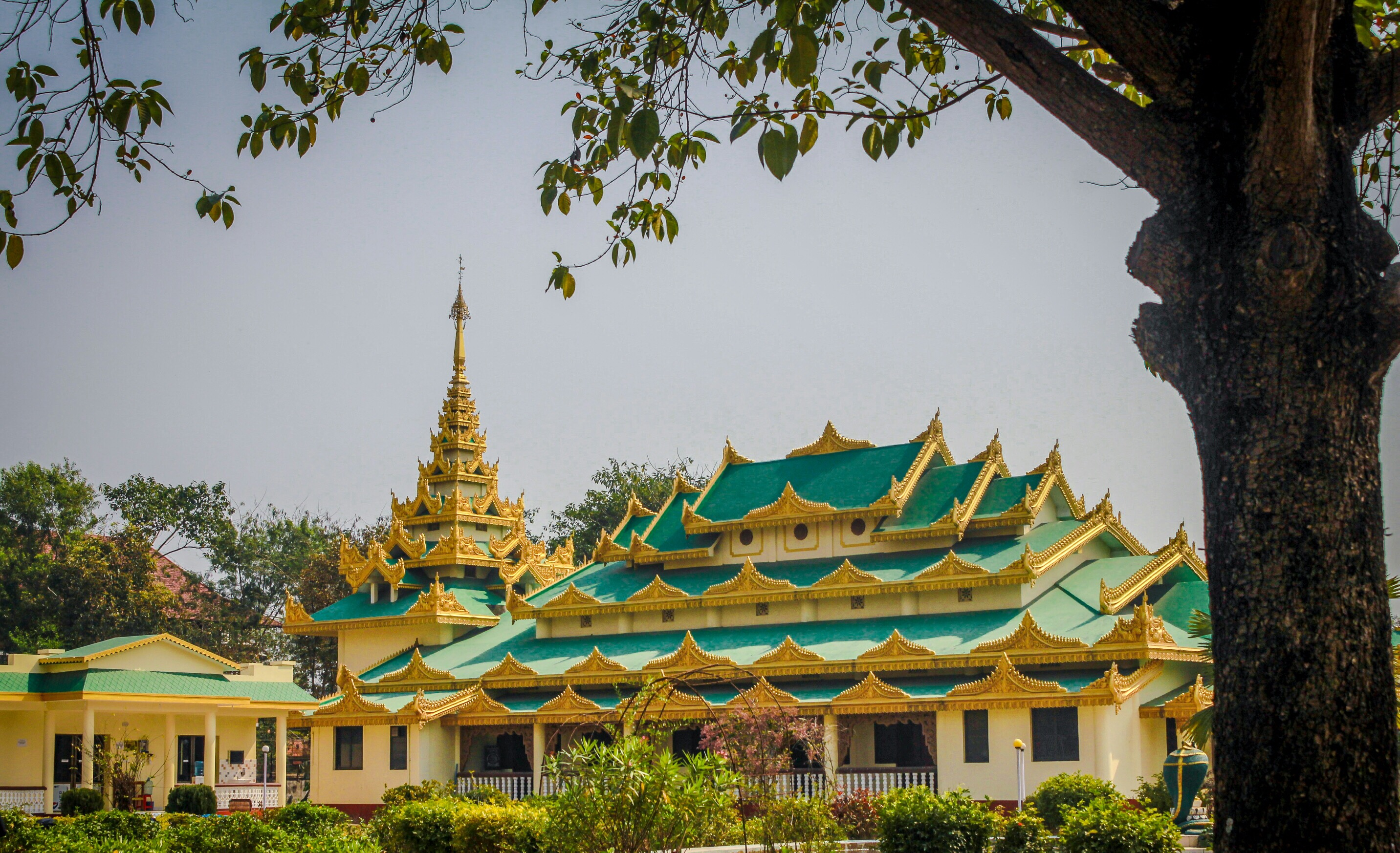
Golden Temple of Myanmar

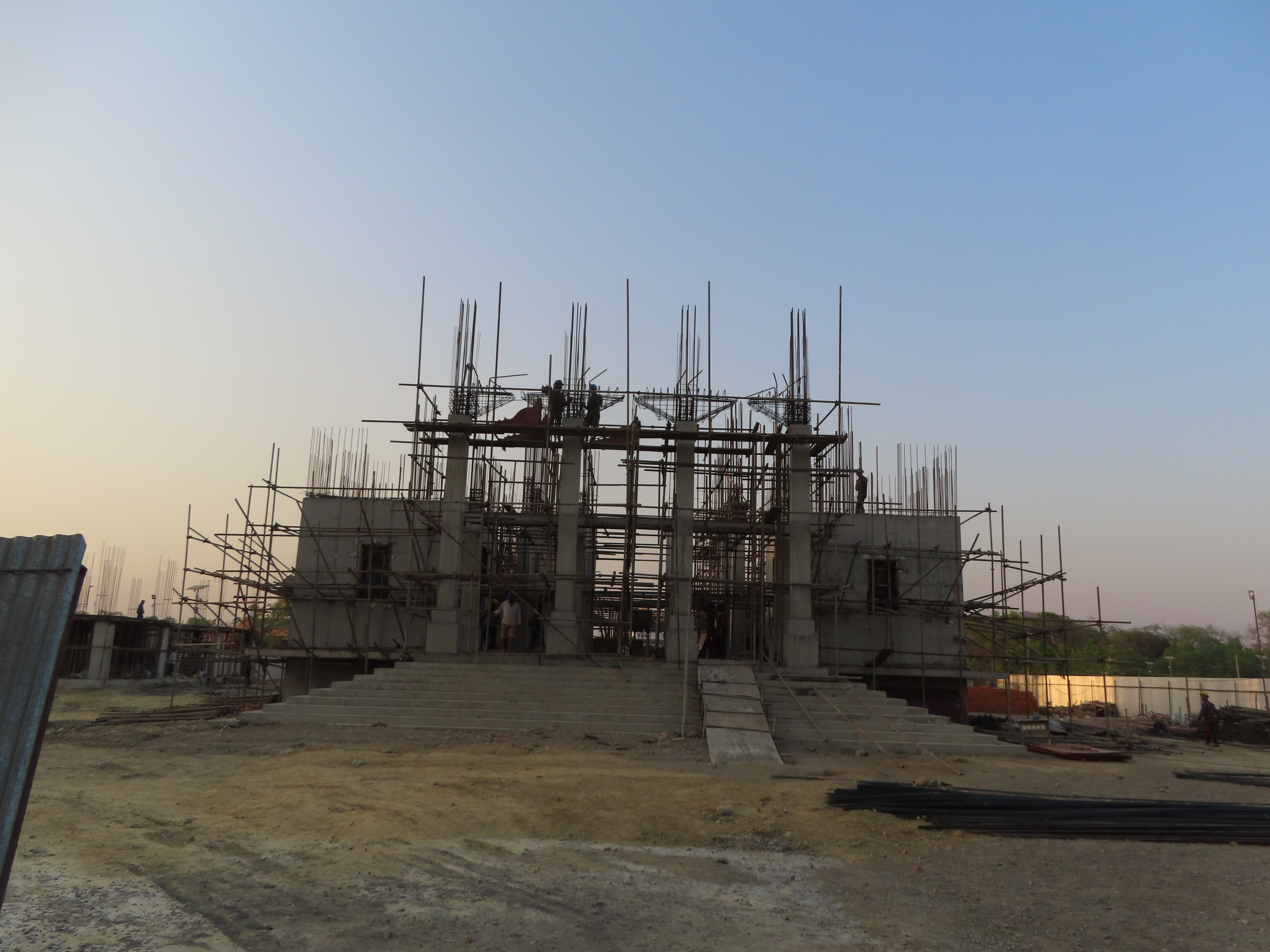
Russian Monastery (under construction, April 2024)

== Religious significance ==
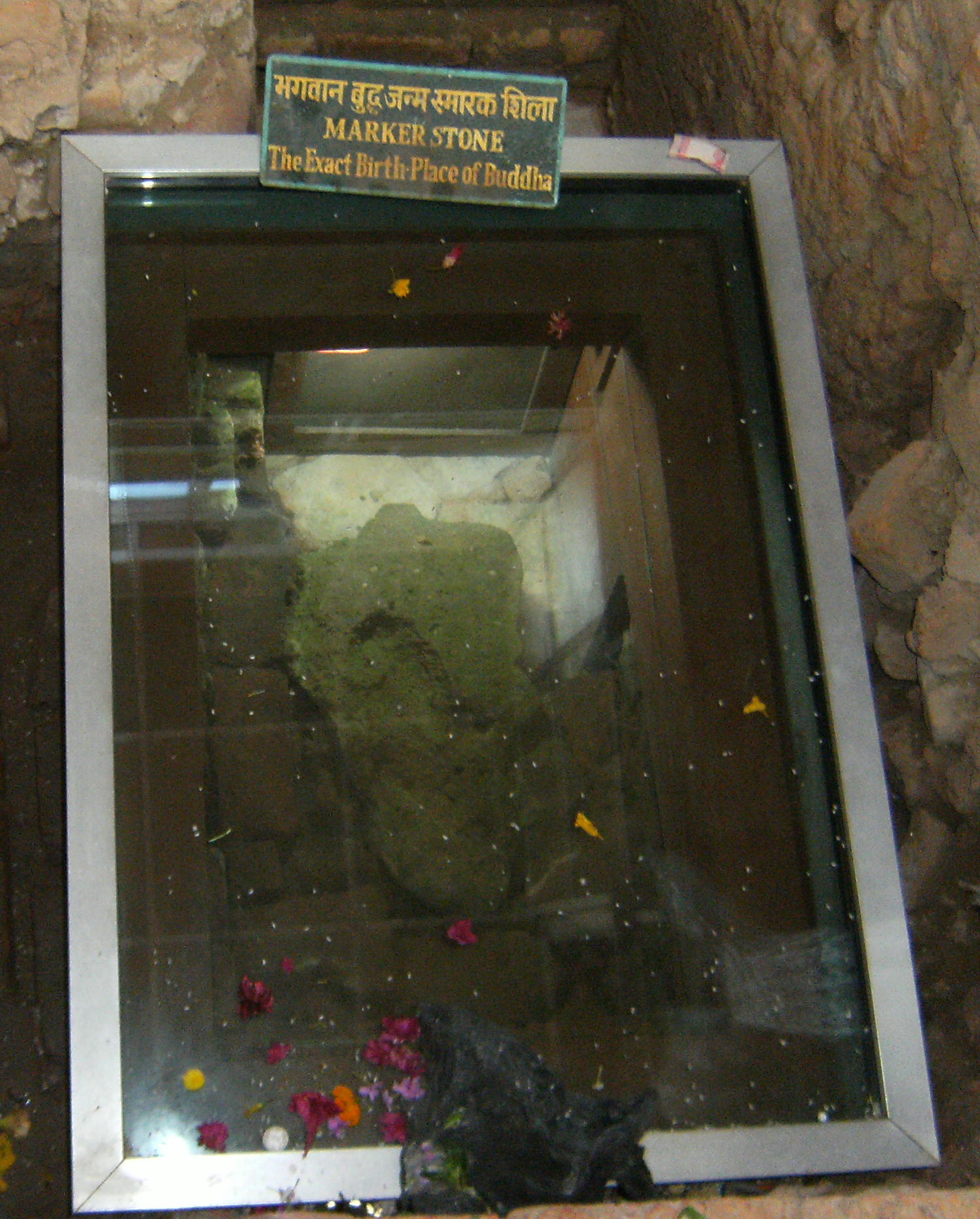
Marker stone of Gautama Buddha's birth at Mayadevi Temple

Before parinirvana at the age of eighty, Gautama Buddha gave a sermon to his disciples on the significance of Lumbini as a place of pilgrimage (Dīghanikāya, 16; Mahāparinibbāṇa Sutta):

There are, O monks, four places on earth which a believing householder's son or a believing householder's daughter should commemorate as long as they live. Which are those four? –here the Venerable One has been born – here the Venerable One has attained the unsurpassable complete enlightenment – here the Venerable One has turned the threefold-turning, twelve-spoked lawful wheel – here the Venerable One has gone to the realm of complete nirvāṇa.

— Dīgha Nikāya, 16; Mahāparinibbāṇa Sutta

Along with Lumbini, which is the Buddha's place of birth, Bodh Gaya where he attained enlightenment, Sarnath where he gave his first sermon and Kushinagar where he attained parinirvana are the four most significant pilgrimage sites in Buddhism. These four places form a pilgrimage circuit along Buddha's Holy Sites.

== Excavation at the Mayadevi Temple in 2013 ==
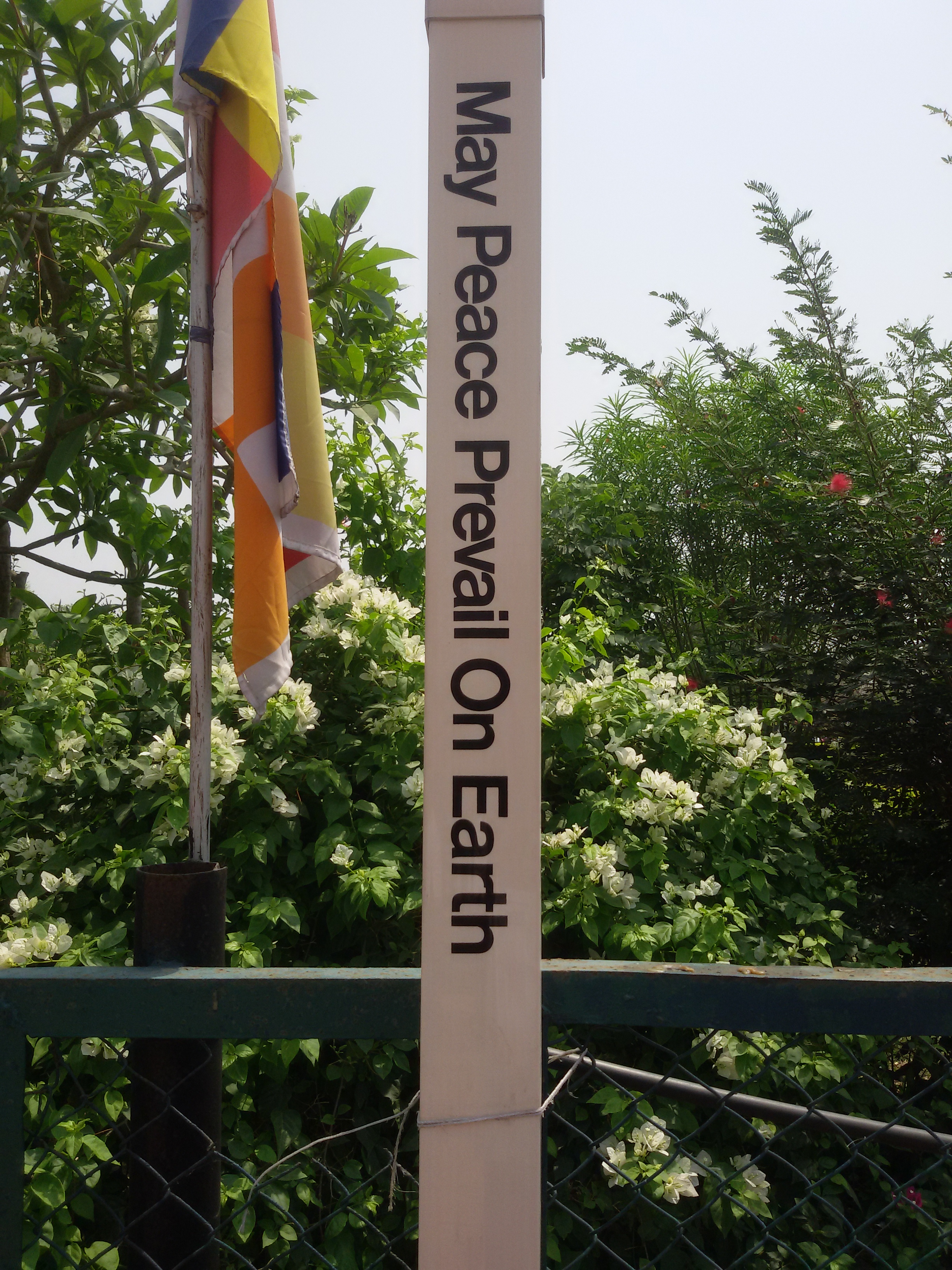
"May Peace Prevail on Earth" sign in front of the gate of Lumbini

New excavations in the Mayadevi temple in Lumbini in 2013 revealed a series of the most ancient Buddhist shrines in South Asia extending the history of the site to a much earlier date. According to Robin Coningham, excavations beneath existing brick structures at the Mayadevi Temple at Lumbini provide evidence for an older timber structure beneath the walls of a brick Buddhist shrine built during the Ashokan era (3rd-century BCE). The layout of the Ashokan shrine closely follows that of the earlier timber structure, which suggests a continuity of worship at the site. The pre-Mauryan timber structure appears to be an ancient tree shrine. Radiocarbon dating of charcoal from the wooden postholes and optically stimulated luminescence dating of elements in the soil suggests human activity began at Lumbini around 1000 BCE. The archaeological excavations challenge the original understanding of King Ashoka's role in establishing Lumbini as the Buddha's birthplace. What researchers found suggests that Lumbini had held religious significance long before Ashoka's pilgrimage to Lumbini. The site, states Coningham, may be a Buddhist monument from 6th-century BCE. Other scholars state that the excavations revealed nothing that is Buddhist, and they only confirm that the site predates the Buddha.

== Other developments ==
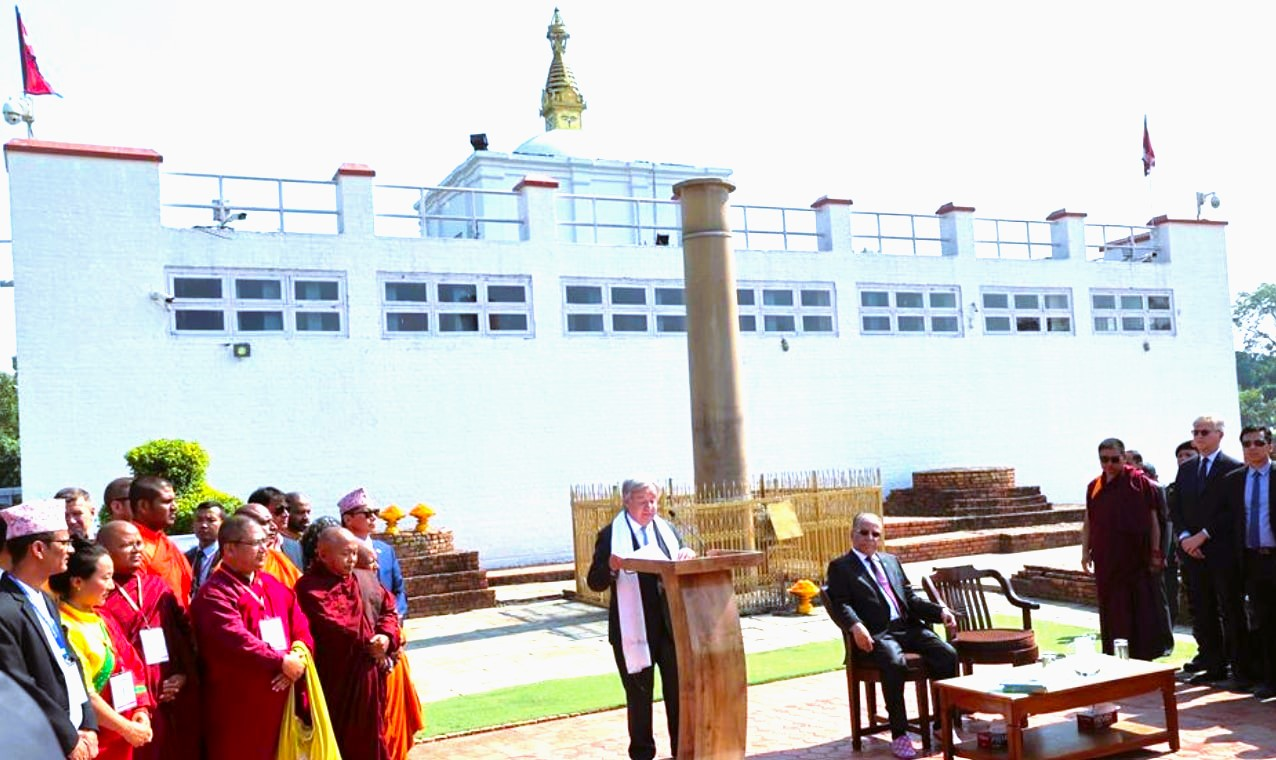
António Guterres, secretary-general of the United Nations speaking in Lumbini on his Nepal visit (2023)

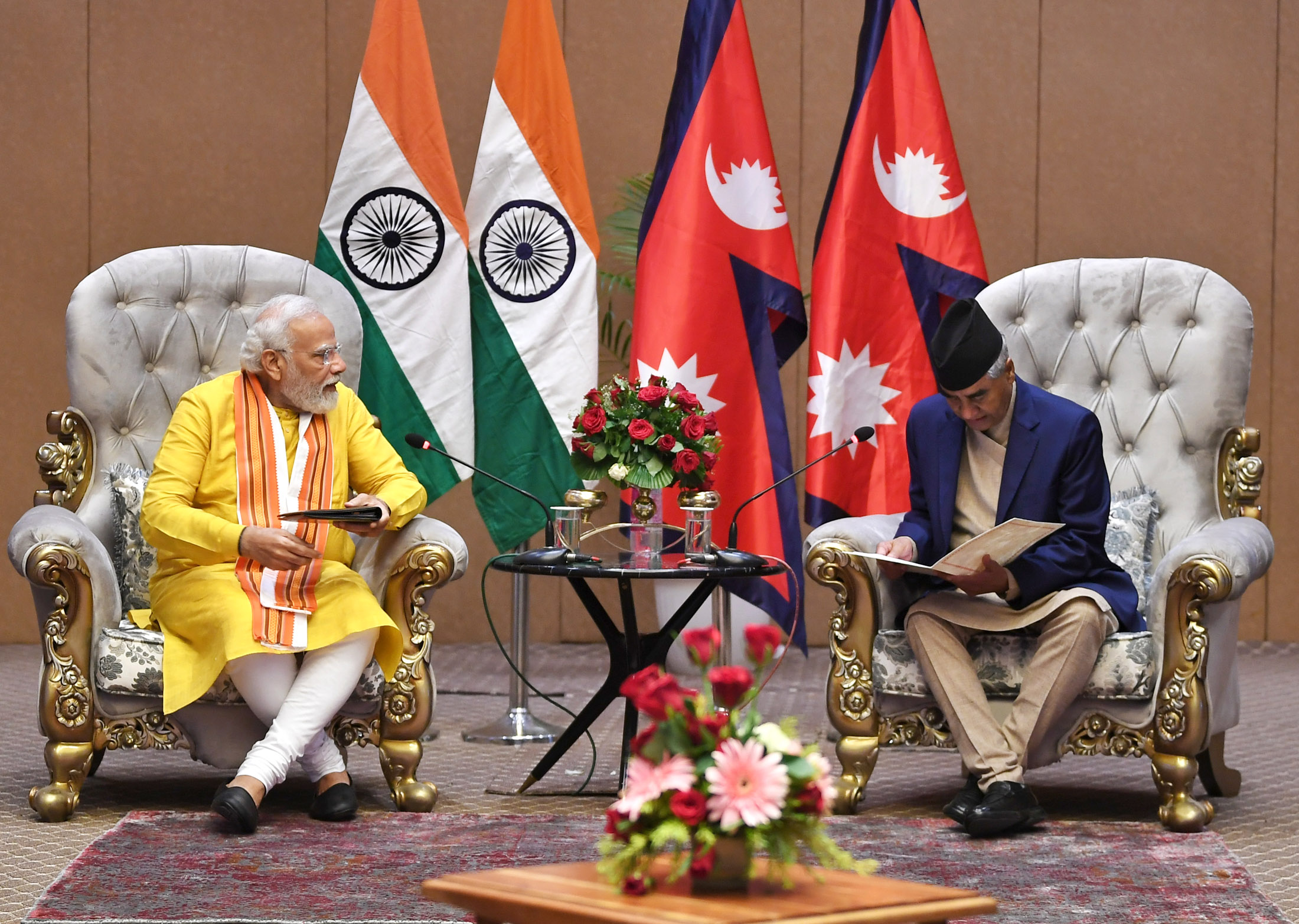
Prime Minister of Nepal Sher Bahadur Deuba with Indian Prime Minister Narendra Modi at Lumbini on Buddha Purnima

In 2013, Nepal's central bank introduced a 100-rupee Nepali note featuring Lumbini. The Nepal Rastra Bank said the new note would be accessible only during the Dashain, Nepal's major festival in September or October. It displays a portrait of Mayadevi in metallic silver on the front. The note also has a black dot on it to help visually impaired people recognise it. The name of the central bank is printed on the note in Roman script along with the date of printing in both the Gregorian calendar and the Bikrami calendar. The note was issued following a cabinet decision 27 August 2013.

Nipponzan Myohoji decided to build a Peace Pagoda in the park in 2001, which is visited by many different cultures and religions every day. Because some Hindus regard the Buddha as an incarnation of Vishnu, thousands of Hindus have begun to come here on pilgrimage during the full moon of the Nepali month of Baisakh (April–May) to worship Queen Mayadevi as Rupa Devi, the mother goddess of Lumbini. Lumbini was granted World Heritage status by UNESCO in 1997.

In 2011, Lumbini Development National Director Committee was formed under the leadership of Prime Minister Prachanda.The committee was given the authority to "draft a master plan to develop Lumbini as a peaceful and tourism area and table the proposal" and the responsibility to gather international support for the same.

In 2022 on Buddha's Birthday, Indian Prime Minister Narendra Modi and Nepalese Prime Minister Sher Bahadur Deuba, jointly laid the foundation stone for the Indian monastery in Lumbini. Nepal-India cultural events are held annually in Lumbini highlighting the close spiritual and cultural connection between the two countries. António Guterres, secretary-general of the United Nations made a visit to Lumbini in October 2023 and "urged everyone to reflect on the core teachings of Buddhism and their relevance in today’s troubled world ", highlighting conflicts around the world from Middle East to Ukraine to Africa, undermining of global rules and their devastating impacts on ordinary people, especially women and children.

== Tourism ==
In 2019, Lumbini received 1.5 million tourists from around the world.

In April of 1967, former United Nations secretary-general U Thant advocated for the site's revitalization, envisioning it as a global pilgrimage destination and a symbol of peace after he took a self-described "pilgrimage" to Lumbini. A bust of U Thant can be seen at Lumbini to commemorate his role in taking the initiative to develop the site as a peace center and as an international pilgrimage destination. Lumbini is one of several locations Buddhists pilgrimage to as they are places where the significant moments occurred on the Buddha's path toward enlightenment. Millions of Buddhists travel to Lumbini, Buddha's birthplace, Bodhgaya, where the Buddha attained enlightenment, Sarnath, where the Buddha delivered his first teaching, and finally Kushinagar, where the Buddha reached Parinirvana. Historically, pilgrimaging to Lumbini has been primarily done by Buddhist monks, such as Xuanzang and Faxian, and rulers, such as Emperor Ashoka for religious and spiritual purposes.

Pilgrimage tourism has become an important factor in Lumbini's revitalization. While some Buddhist pilgrims visit Lumbini to seek spiritual fulfillment, other non-religious visitors travel to the site to see its architecture, monuments, and heritage. Millions of international visitors of various backgrounds come to Lumbini for multiple reasons and often have a mixture of religious and secular aspirations. Religious tourists travel to Lumbini to develop their beliefs, discover the origins of their religion, while simultaneously experiencing other cultures.

Most Buddhists pilgrims visit Lumbini to see the Maya Devi temple. The temple contains a stone marker that commemorates Lumbini as the Buddha's place of birth. To preserve the site's archeological condition, visitor access is heavily restricted. Outside of the Maya Devi temple, pilgrimage related rituals take place. In the surrounding garden visitors participating in rituals have been seen bowing to the Ashoka pillar, visiting Pushkarini Lake, praying, and meditating. The local monasteries in Lumbini allow visitors to worship, organize sermons and retreats, as well as providing monks and pilgrims a place to stay. April-May holidays and November-December festival period are popular times for Indian and Nepalese visitors meanwhile, most foreign visitors tend to visit Lumbini from October to March. Majority of these international visitors come from other Buddhist countries such as Sri Lanka, China, Japan, Thailand and South Korea.

=== Transport ===
Lumbini is a 10-hour drive from Kathmandu and a 30-minute drive from Bhairahawa. The closest airport is Gautam Buddha Airport at Bhairahawa, with flights to and from Kathmandu.

=== Places to visit ===
- Maya Devi Temple
- World Peace Pagoda, Lumbini
- Ashoka Pillar of Lumbini
- Lumbini Crane Sanctuary

=== Hotels ===
An increase in international tourism in the 2010s combined with the development of Gautam Buddha International Airport have led to significant investment in the construction of hotels in and around Lumbini, with 80 new hotels being constructed in the region in 2017.

== Sister cities ==
Lumbini has four official sister cities:

- Kushinagar, India (2022)
- Bodh Gaya, India
- Cáceres, Spain
- Kōya, Japan

== See also ==
- Bodh Gaya
- Sarnath
- Kushinagar
- Maya Devi Temple, Lumbini
- Lumbini Buddhist University
- Lumbini Development Trust
- Lumbini pillar inscription
- Pillars of Ashoka
- Ramagrama stupa
- Kindo Baha
- Pranidhipurna Mahavihar
- Rajgir
- World Peace Pagoda
- List of stupas in Nepal
- List of Buddhist monasteries in Nepal

== Bibliography ==
- Weise, Kai; et al. (2013), The Sacred Garden of Lumbini – Perceptions of Buddha's Birthplace (PDF), Paris: UNESCO, archived from the original (PDF) on 30 August 2014
