= Lumbini Crane Sanctuary =

Sanctuary for cranes in Nepal

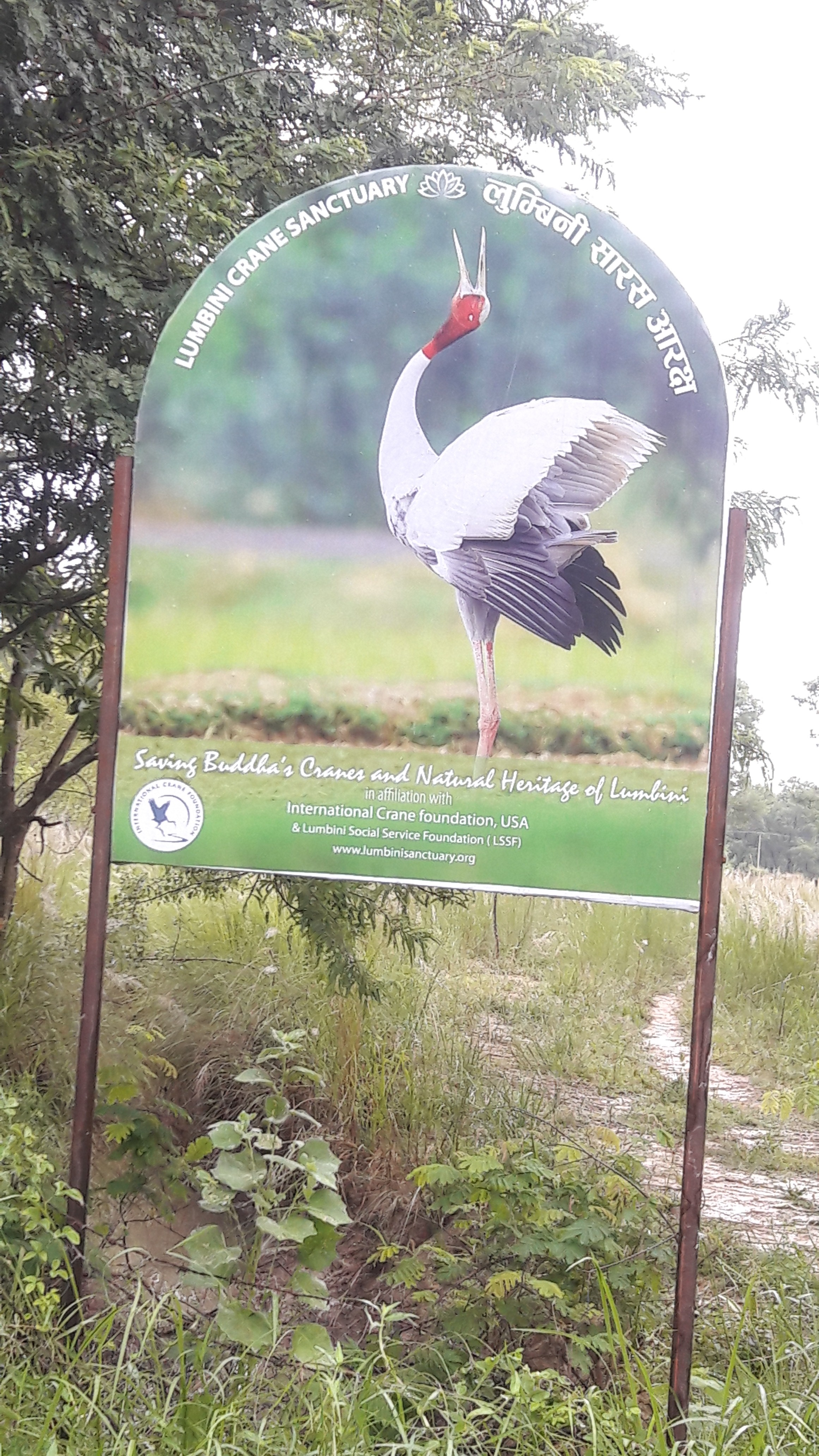
Lumbini Crane Sanctuary sign

The ancient Lumbini Garden that spreads over the 6 km^{2} area has been developed into a sanctuary for cranes in Nepal.

The ruins of the palace of Tilaurakot (ancient capital of the Sakya kingdom of Kapilavastu), where Siddhartha lived his first 29 years, are located 27 km west of Lumbini.
