= The Amazing Race Australia 9 =

Season of television series

- Season 9
- Presented by: Beau Ryan
- No. of teams: 13
- Winners: Stephen & Bernard Curry
- No. of legs: 15
- Distance traveled: 24,000 km (15,000 mi)
- No. of episodes: 15

Release
- Original network: Network 10
- Original release: 8 September – 20 October 2025

Additional information
- Filming dates: 18 March – 14 April 2025

Series chronology
- ← Previous; Celebrity Edition 2

The Amazing Race Australia 9, also known as The Amazing Race Australia: Celebrity Edition 3, is the ninth season of The Amazing Race Australia, an Australian reality competition show based on the American series The Amazing Race. The season is the sixth instalment of Network 10's iteration of the show and the third celebrity edition. Hosted by Beau Ryan, it features thirteen teams of two, each with a pre-existing relationship and including at least one celebrity contestant, in a race around Asia to win the grand prize of A$100,000 for the winners' chosen charity.

Filming took place between 18 March and 14 April 2025. This season visited one continent and five countries, travelling approximately 24,000 kilometres (15,000 mi) over fifteen legs. Starting in Pokhara, racers travelled through Nepal, Uzbekistan, Sri Lanka, Taiwan and Indonesia before finishing in the Special Region of Yogyakarta. New elements introduced in this season include the Face Off. The season premiered on 8 September 2025 and concluded on 20 October 2025.

Actor brothers Stephen and Bernard Curry were the winners of this season, while entertainer couple Rob Mills and Georgie Tunny finished in second place and reality star Aesha Scott and her partner Scott Dobson finished in third place.

== Production ==
=== Development and filming ===
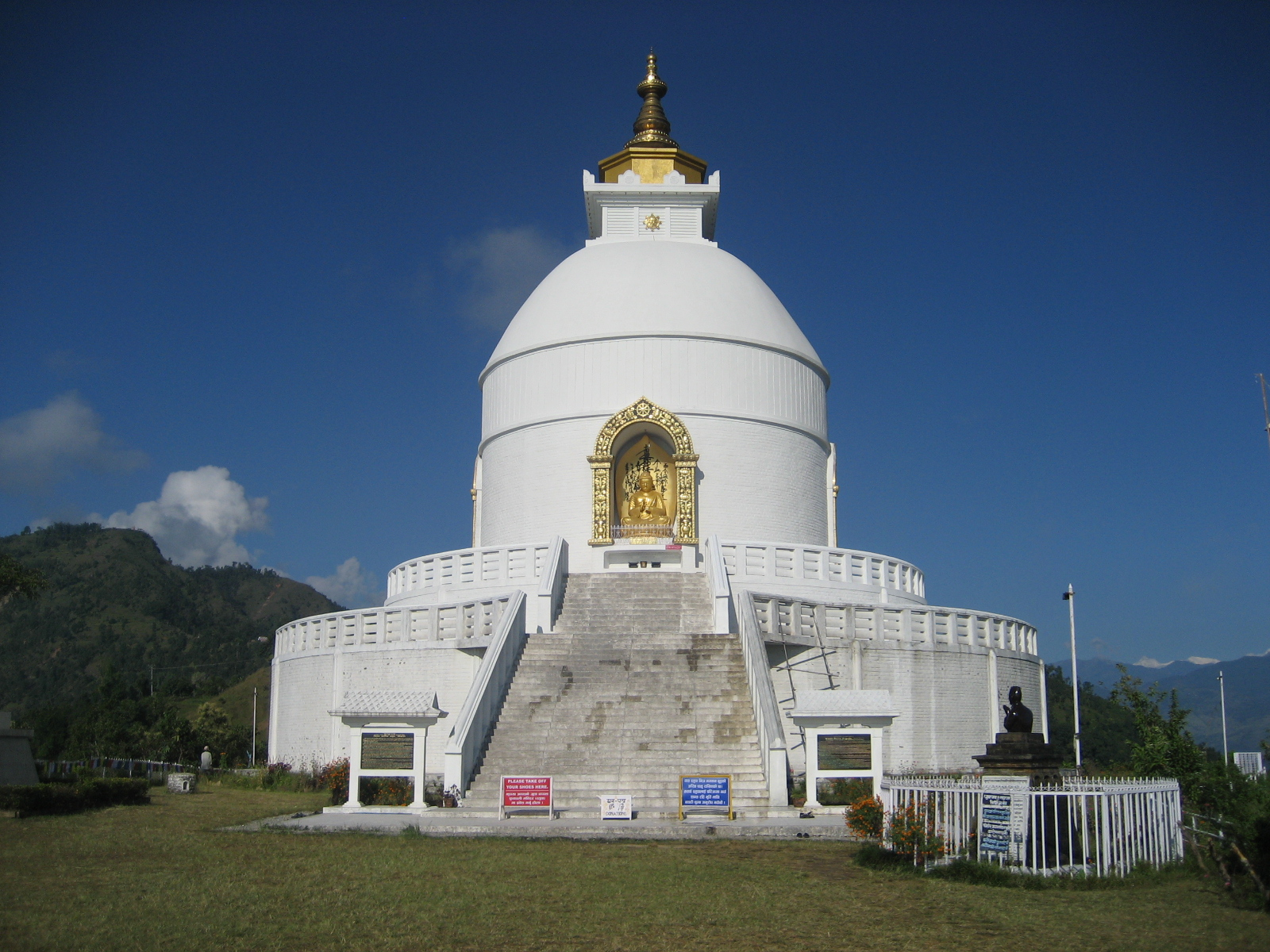
The celebrities assembled at the Shanti Stupa in Pokhara, Nepal, for the start of the third Celebrity Edition race.

On 28 January 2025, Dan Monaghan, Senior Vice President Content & Programming, revealed to TV Tonight that a third celebrity season was in production with the cast set to be revealed soon. On 14 March 2025, Beau Ryan announced that he would be taking a weeks-long hiatus from his Triple M radio hosting to film The Amazing Race Australia. Teams were then spotted leaving from Sydney Airport on 16 March 2025. Filming for this season began on 18 March 2025 with the cast revealed on the subsequent day. This season was the first time that any version of The Amazing Race filmed in Uzbekistan with the show filming in Samarkand and Tersak from 24 March to 27 March. This season also included first-time visits to Nepal and Taiwan along with returning visits to Sri Lanka and Indonesia, which were previously visited on season 1. This season also introduced the Face Off, where two teams had to compete against each other in a task. Filming concluded on 14 April 2025.

On 18 April 2025, the Herald Sun reported that Ant & Dan were ejected following an off-camera verbal altercation with another team. According to the tabloid, Dan Middleton began yelling at Luke & "Sassy" Scott following a night out during a break in between legs. Luke & Scott later stated that Middleton approached them multiple times and made homophobic remarks and gestures while becoming increasingly aggressive. The event was witnessed by Brendan Fevola, who threatened to leave if Middleton was not removed for his misconduct. A representative for Network 10 stated, "Following a breach of the production's code of conduct by one contestant, on a day off during production, a team from The Amazing Race Australia was disqualified and swiftly sent home." Ant & Dan were notably excluded from preseason marketing, were featured minimally in the edited show prior to their ejection and disqualification, and were removed from the opening sequence following the first episode.

=== Casting ===
With regard to this season's casting, Monaghan stated that "this year we've got siblings, married couples, engaged couples, famous parents and their kids, and then we’ve got a couple of different relationships."

== Release ==
=== Broadcast ===
On 16 April 2025, Monaghan stated that the season would premiere after Australian Survivor: Australia V The World. The first full promo for the season aired on 18 August 2025, with the promo also revealing the premiere date of 8 September 2025.

== Cast ==
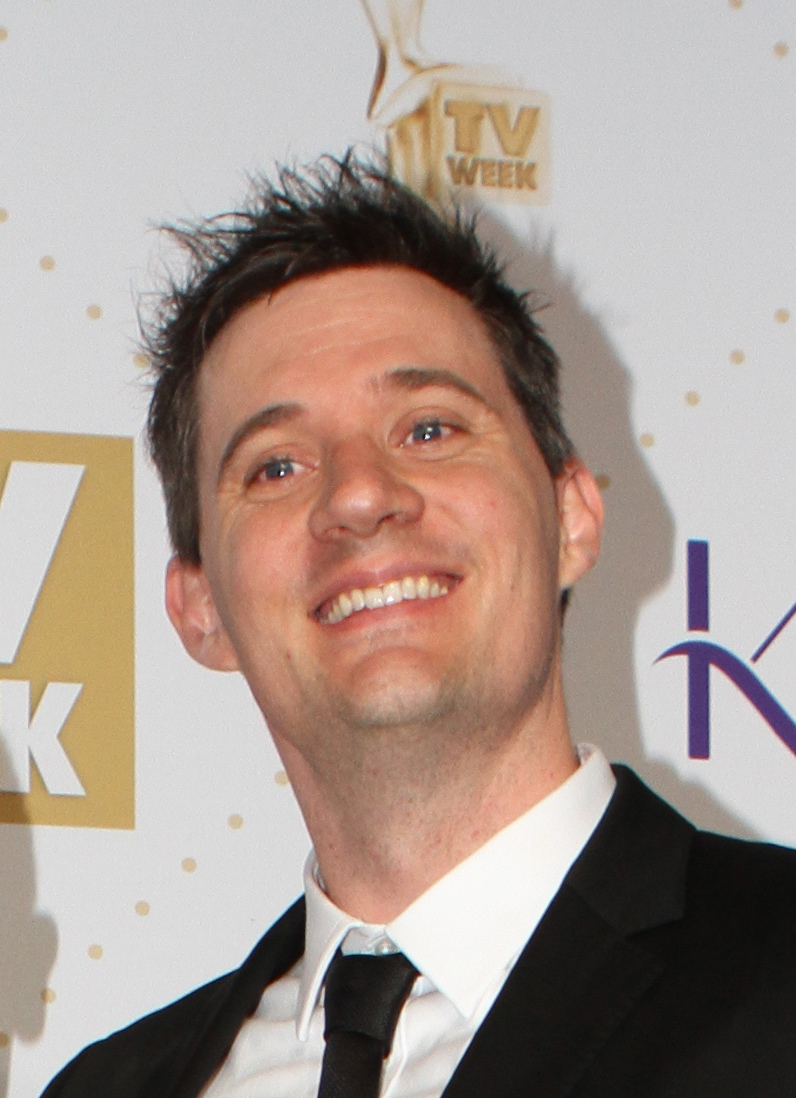
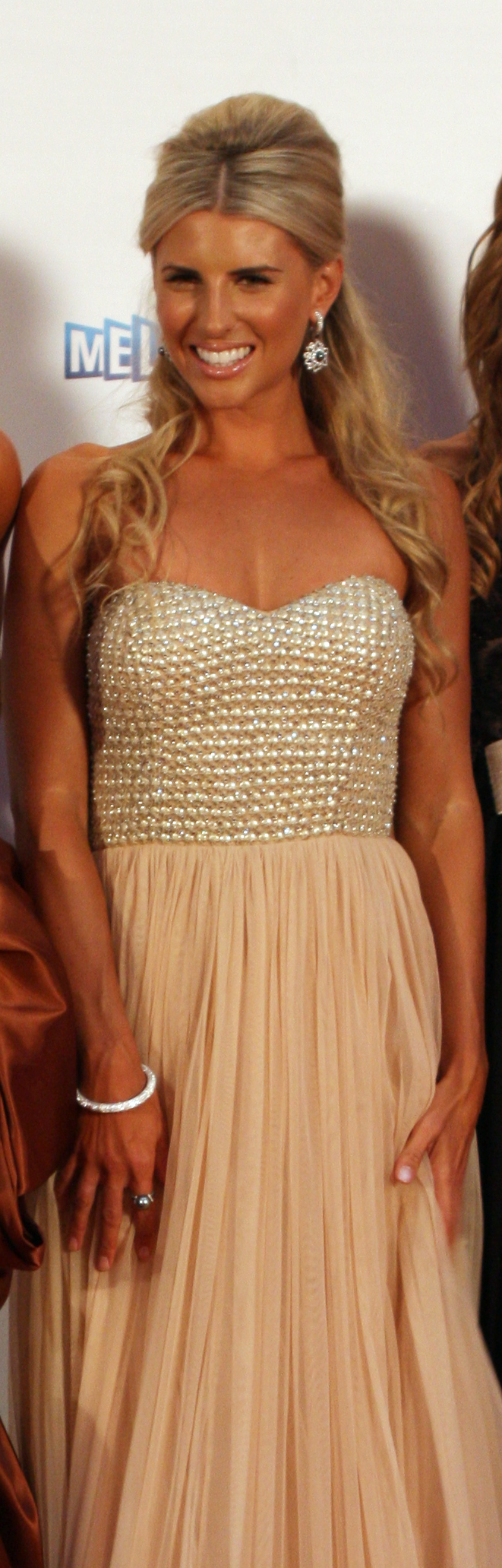
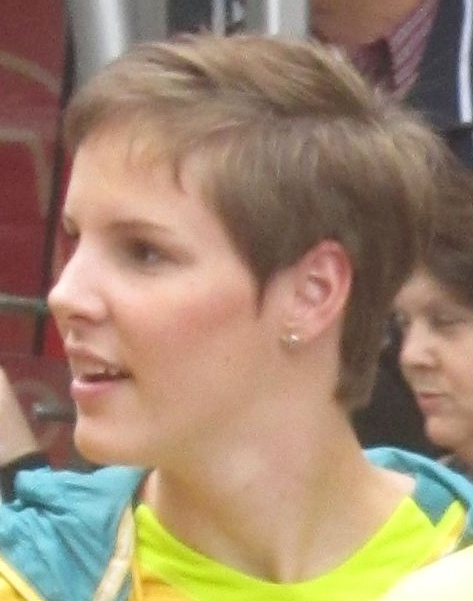
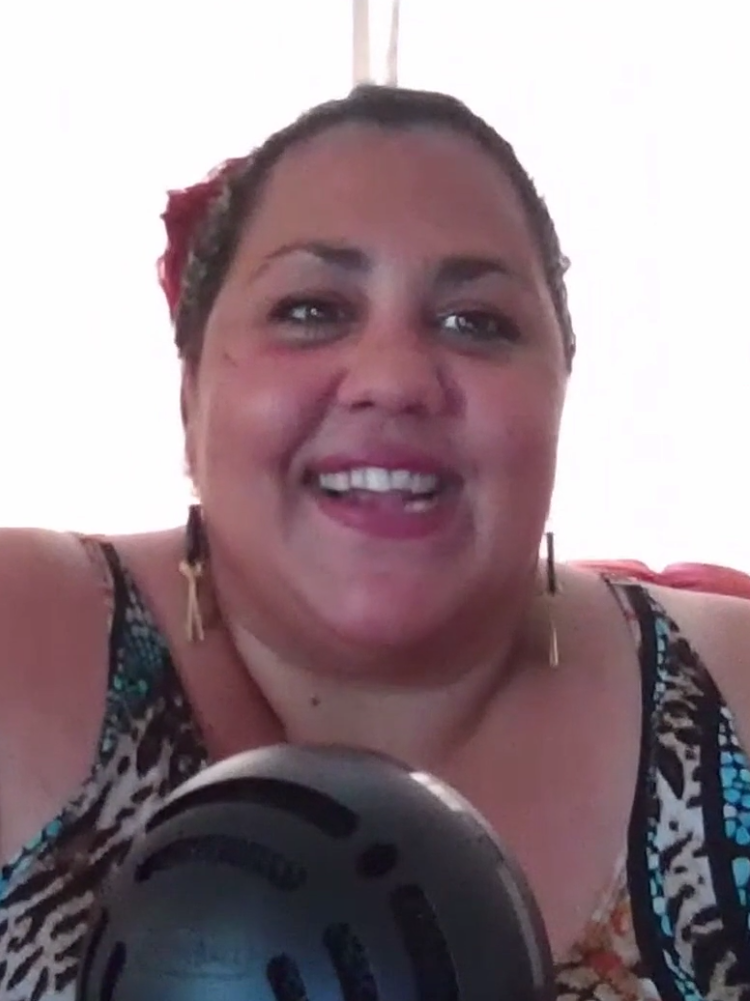
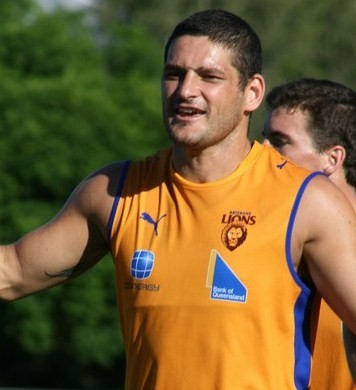
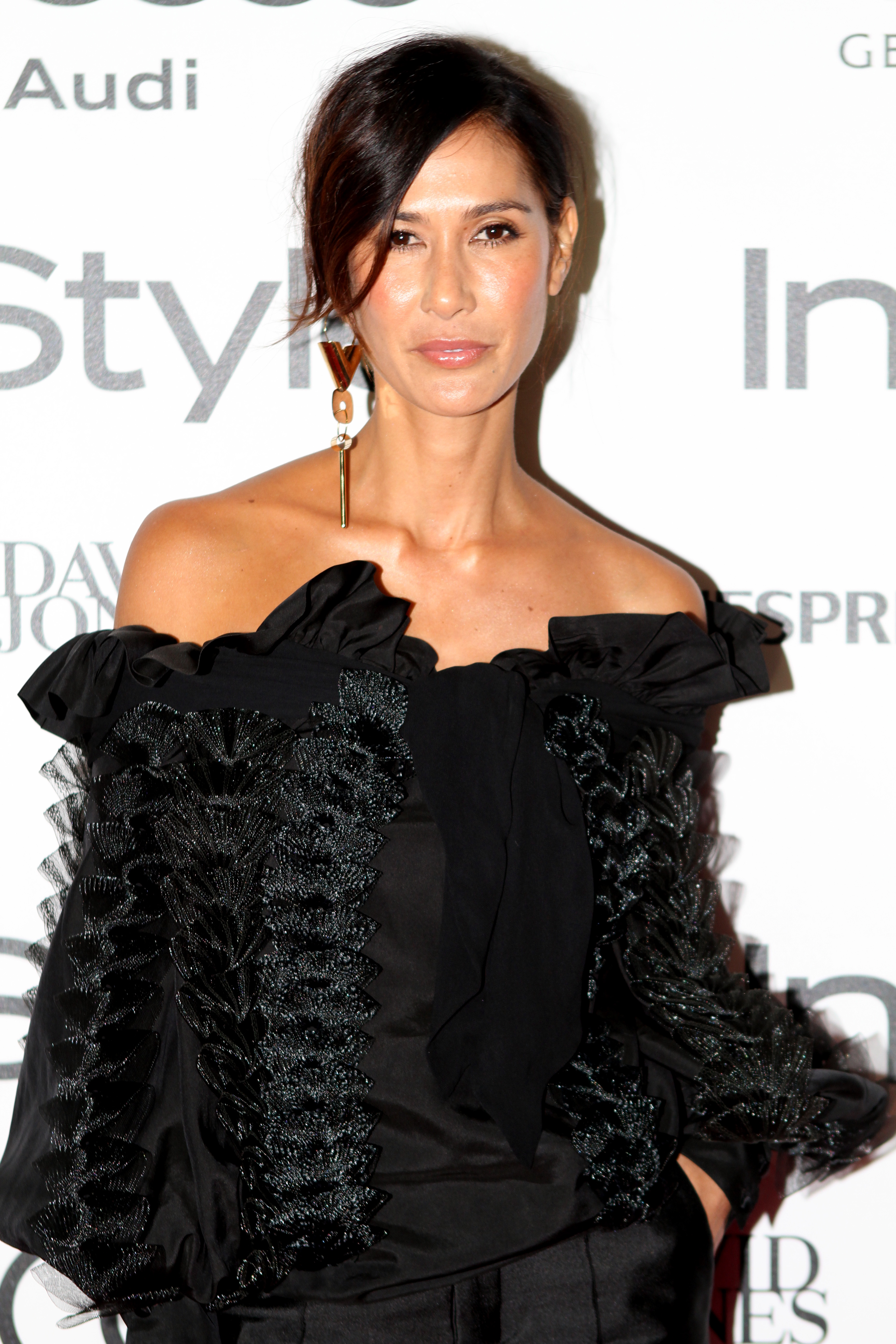
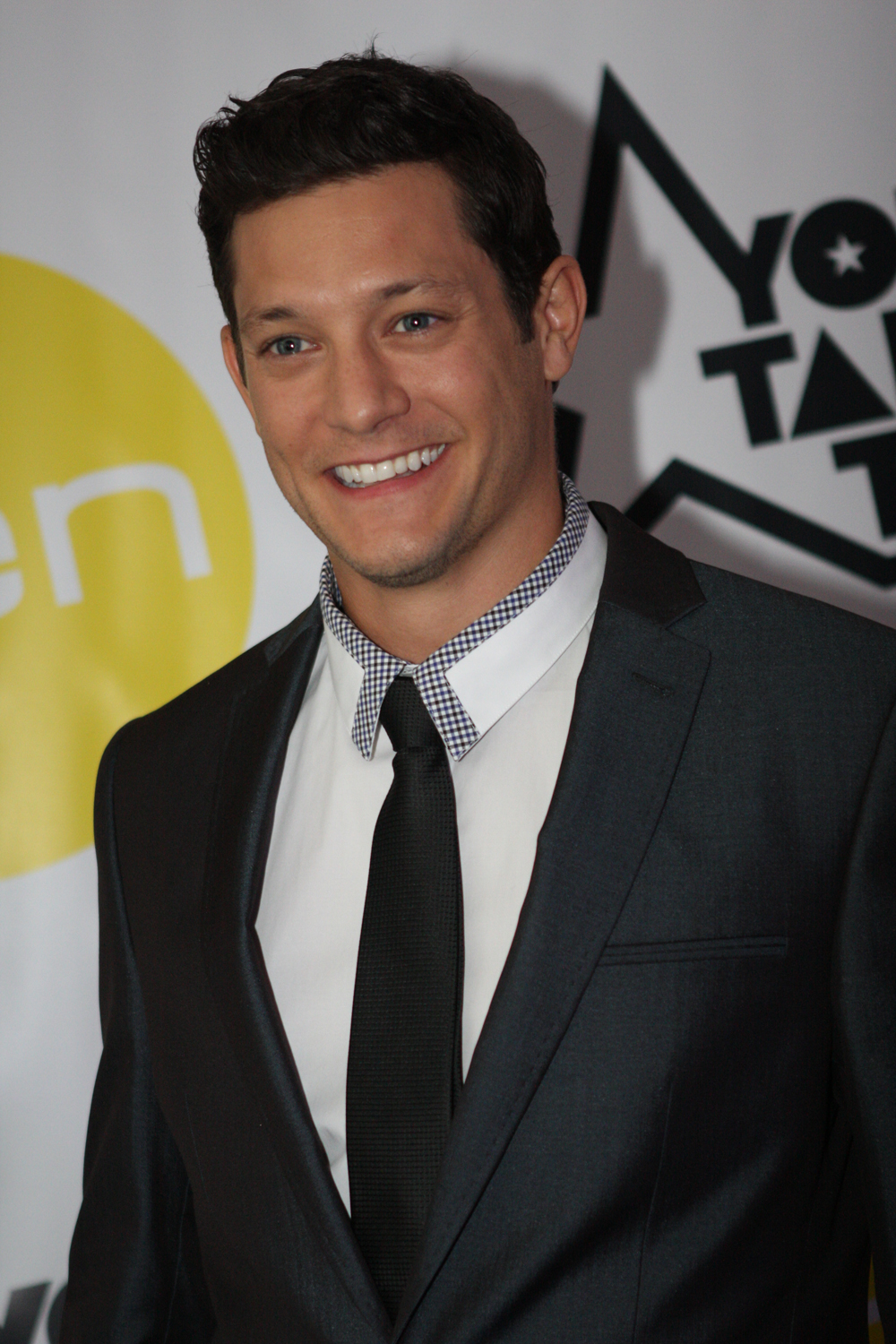
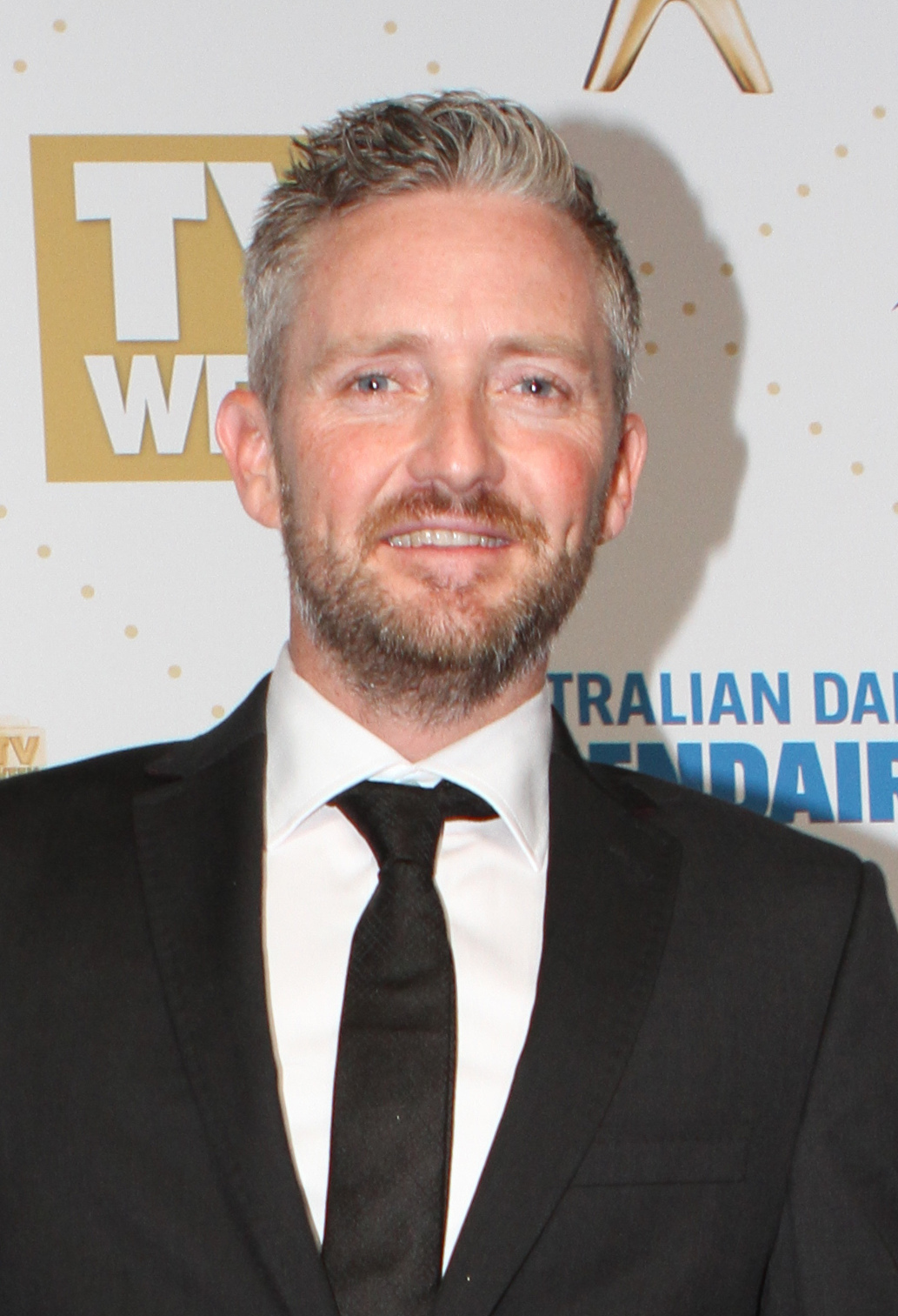
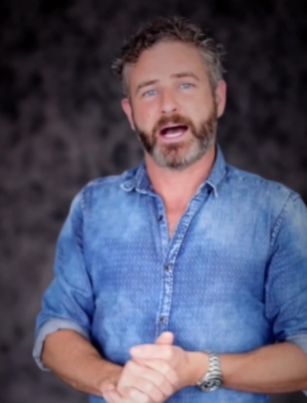
From left to right: Ed Kavalee, Tiffiny Hall, Bronte Campbell, Steph Tisdell, Brendan "Fev" Fevola, Lindy Klim, Rob Mills, Stephen Curry and Bernard Curry

The cast consists of celebrities and their relatives and friends.

Contestants	Notability	Age	Relationship	Charity	Status
Ed Kavalee	Comedian	45	Married	Learning for Life Autism Centre	Eliminated 1st (in Pokhara, Nepal)
Tiffiny "Tiff" Hall	Former Gladiator & The Biggest Loser trainer	40	Married	Learning for Life Autism Centre	Eliminated 1st (in Pokhara, Nepal)
Ant Middleton	Former soldier & television personality	44	Brothers	—N/a (Note: Ant & Dan did not have their charity publicised during their participation on the show.)	Disqualified (in Pokhara, Nepal)
Dan Middleton	—N/a	46	Brothers	—N/a	Disqualified (in Pokhara, Nepal)
Bronte Campbell	Olympian swimmer	30	Olympian & Fiancé	Carers Australia	Eliminated 2nd (in Bhaktapur, Nepal)
Benfield Lainchbury	—N/a	35	Olympian & Fiancé	Carers Australia	Eliminated 2nd (in Bhaktapur, Nepal)
Steph Tisdell	Comedian	32	Comedian Sister & Brother	Bright Water Foundation	Eliminated 3rd (in Samarkand, Uzbekistan)
Ben Tisdell	—N/a	34	Comedian Sister & Brother	Bright Water Foundation	Eliminated 3rd (in Samarkand, Uzbekistan)
Dom "Tomato" Di Tommaso	Freerunning athlete	32	YouTube Parkour Mates	National Breast Cancer Foundation	Eliminated 4th (in Tersak, Uzbekistan)
Marx Marsters	—N/a	33	YouTube Parkour Mates	National Breast Cancer Foundation	Eliminated 4th (in Tersak, Uzbekistan)
Brendan "Fev" Fevola	AFL Legend	44	Footy Dad & Daughter	Small Steps 4 Hannah	Withdrew (in Negombo, Sri Lanka)
Leni Fevola	—N/a	18	Footy Dad & Daughter	Small Steps 4 Hannah	Withdrew (in Negombo, Sri Lanka)
Lindy Klim	Model	46	Princess & Daughter	Good Shepherd Australia & New Zealand	Medically removed (in Negombo, Sri Lanka)
Stella Klim	—N/a	19	Princess & Daughter	Good Shepherd Australia & New Zealand	Medically removed (in Negombo, Sri Lanka)
Melissa Leong	MasterChef & Dessert Masters host	43	Foodie Besties	Orygen	Eliminated 5th (in Sigiriya, Sri Lanka)
Leah Wilson	—N/a	44	Foodie Besties	Orygen	Eliminated 5th (in Sigiriya, Sri Lanka)
Gretel Killeen	Comedian & former Big Brother host	62	Screen Icon & Daughter	Hunter Medical Research Institute Women's Health Program	Eliminated 6th (in Wulai District, Taiwan)
Epiphany Morgan	—N/a	33	Screen Icon & Daughter	Hunter Medical Research Institute Women's Health Program	Eliminated 6th (in Wulai District, Taiwan)
Luke O'Halloran	Viral stars	34	TikTok Brothers	Royal Children's Hospital Good Friday Appeal	Eliminated 7th (in Majaksingi, Indonesia)
"Sassy" Scott O'Halloran	Viral stars	39	TikTok Brothers	Royal Children's Hospital Good Friday Appeal	Eliminated 7th (in Majaksingi, Indonesia)
Aesha Scott	Below Deck star	33	Reality Star & Partner	Peace of Mind Foundation	Third place
Scott Dobson	—N/a	34	Reality Star & Partner	Peace of Mind Foundation	Third place
Rob Mills	Singer & Australian Idol finalist	42	Entertainer Couple	Australian Children's Music Foundation	Runners-up
Georgie Tunny	Journalist & The Project co-host	34	Entertainer Couple	Australian Children's Music Foundation	Runners-up
Stephen "Steve" Curry	Actors	48	Actor Brothers	One In Five	Winners
Bernard "Bernie" Curry	Actors	50	Actor Brothers	One In Five	Winners

Future appearances

Following this season, Luke & Scott O'Halloran competed on a celebrity edition of Deal or No Deal. In 2026, Aesha Scott competed on the American show Destination X. In 2027, Bernard Curry competed on Australian Survivor: Rivals.

== Results ==
The following teams are listed with their placements in each leg. Placements are listed in finishing order.

- A red placement with a dagger (†) indicates that the team was eliminated.
- An underlined blue placement with a double-dagger (‡) indicates that the team was the last to arrive at a Pit Stop in a non-elimination leg, and had to perform a Speed Bump task in the following leg.
- An italicized and underlined placement indicates that the team was the last to arrive at a Virtual Pit Stop, and had to perform a Speed Bump task in the following leg. There was no rest period at this Virtual Pit Stop with all teams instructed to continue racing.
- A violet + indicates that the teams encountered an Intersection.
- A teal х indicates that the leg featured a Face Off challenge.

Team placement (by leg)
Team	1	2	3	4+ (Note: This leg featured an Intersection. The teams were paired up thusly: Brendan & Leni and Dom & Marx, Aesha & Scott and Gretel & Epiphany, Rob & Georgie and Melissa & Leah, Luke & Scott and Steve & Bernie, Lindy & Stella and Steph & Ben.)	5	6	7	8	9	10х	11	12	13	14	15
Steve & Bernie	6th	3rd	1st	7th	8th	1st	4th	3rd	5th	2nd	5th‡	1st	2nd	2nd	1st
Rob & Georgie	4th	4th	4th	5th	2nd	4th	6th	1st	3rd	1st	1st	4th	1st	1st	2nd
Aesha & Scott	7th	7th	6th	4th	4th	7th	1st	6th‡	1st	3rd	2nd	2nd	3rd	3rd	3rd
Luke & Scott	11th	10th	10th	8th	7th	2nd	5th	4th	2nd	4th	3rd	3rd	4th‡	4th†	
Gretel & Epiphany	8th	5th	2nd	3rd	1st	5th	3rd	2nd	4th	5th	4th	5th†			
Melissa & Leah	9th	6th	5th	6th	6th	3rd	7th	5th	6th†						
Brendan & Leni	3rd	9th	7th	2nd	9th‡	6th	2nd† (Note: Due to Leni's illness, Brendan ran the entirety of Leg 7 alone. After arriving at the Virtual Pit Stop, he elected to withdraw himself and Leni from the competition.)								
Lindy & Stella	12th	8th	8th	9th	5th	8th	8th† (Note: Lindy & Stella were medically removed from the competition in Leg 7 after Stella suffered from heat exhaustion after the Detour.)								
Dom & Marx	2nd	1st	3rd	1st	3rd	9th† (Note: Dom & Marx initially arrived 4th at the Pit Stop; however, they were issued a 30-minute penalty for not completing the Detour. Eight teams checked in during this penalty time, dropping Dom & Marx to last.)									
Steph & Ben	10th	11th	9th	10th†											
Bronte & Benfield	5th	2nd	11th†												
Ant & Dan	1st	† (Note: Ant & Dan were removed from the competition prior to the start of the second leg for a breach of conduct.)													
Ed & Tiff	13th† (Note: Ed & Tiff initially arrived 11th at the Pit Stop; however, they were issued a 20-minute penalty for not completing the Detour. Luke & Scott and Lindy & Stella checked in during this penalty time, dropping Ed & Tiff to last.)														

== Race summary ==
Destinations	Air travel Rail travel Water travel Bus travel Helicopter travel Bicycle travel Gondola travel
Route Markers	Detour Roadblock Face Off Speed Bump Intersection Pit Stop

=== Leg 1 (Nepal) ===
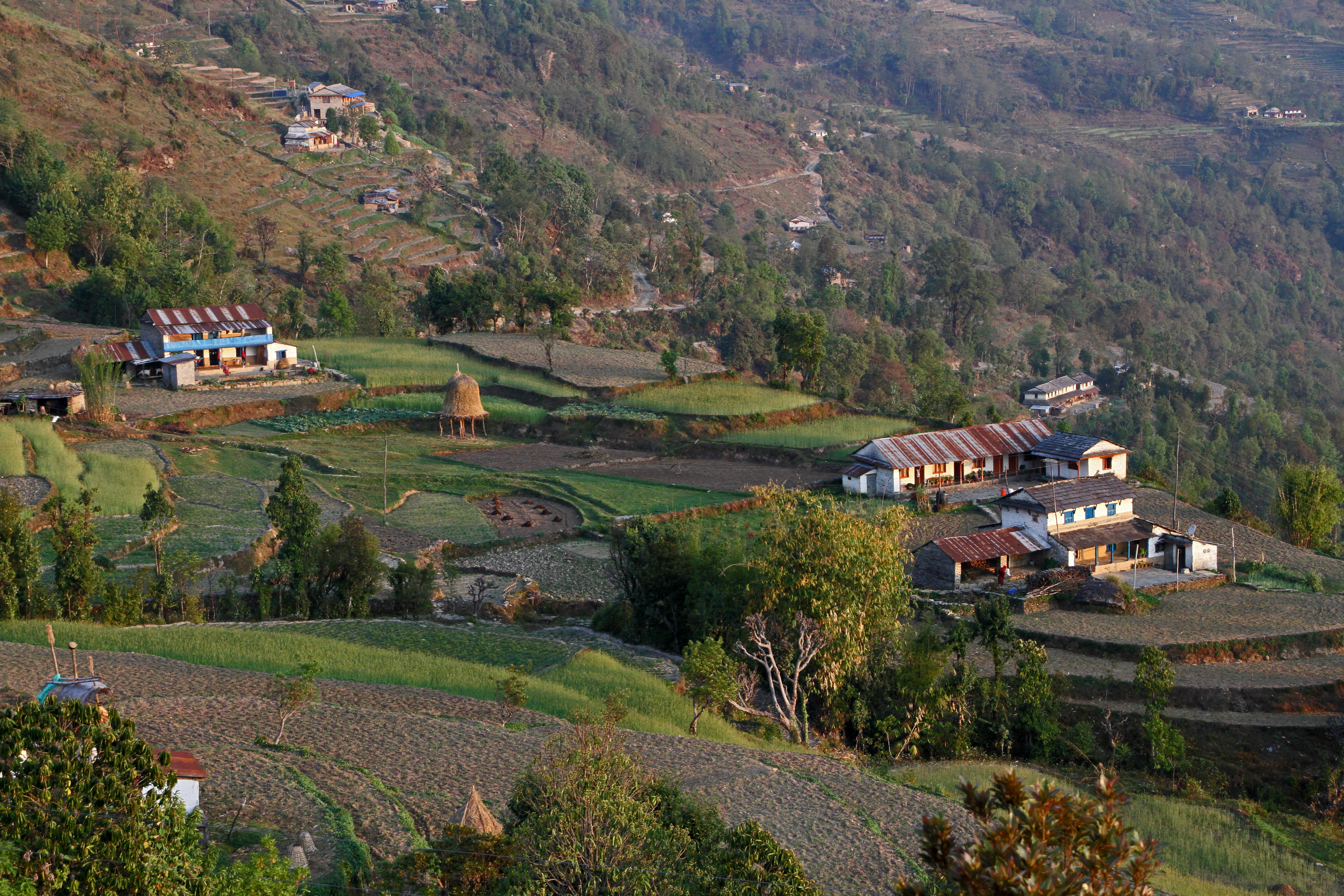
The first Detour of the season was set in the village of Dhampus within the Annapurna mountain range of the Himalayas.

- Episode 1 (8 September 2025)
- Eliminated: Ed & Tiff

Locations

- Pokhara, Nepal (Shanti Stupa) (Starting Line)
- Pokhara (Phewa Lake)
- Pokhara (Pal Ewam Namgyal Monastic School)
- Dhampus (Maithigar Hotel & Restaurant – Terrace Farm)
- Pokhara (Pema Ts'al Sakya Monastery)

Episode summary

- Teams began at the Shanti Stupa and were instructed to travel to Phewa Lake, where they had to row a boat to a floating shrine and present an offering to the goddess Barahi before retrieving their next clue.
- After rowing back to shore, teams then had to travel by marked car to Pal Ewam Namgyal Monastic School and learn a Buddhist chant in Nepali from the student monks before receiving their next clue.
- This season's first Detour was a choice between Maize Rack or Haystack. In Maize Rack, teams had to tie cobs of maize into 30 bundles and hang them on a rack before receiving their next clue. In Haystack, teams had to stack hay around a bamboo pole to a specified width and height before receiving their next clue.
- After the Detour, teams had to check in at the Pit Stop: the Pema Ts'al Sakya Monastery.

=== Leg 2 (Nepal) ===
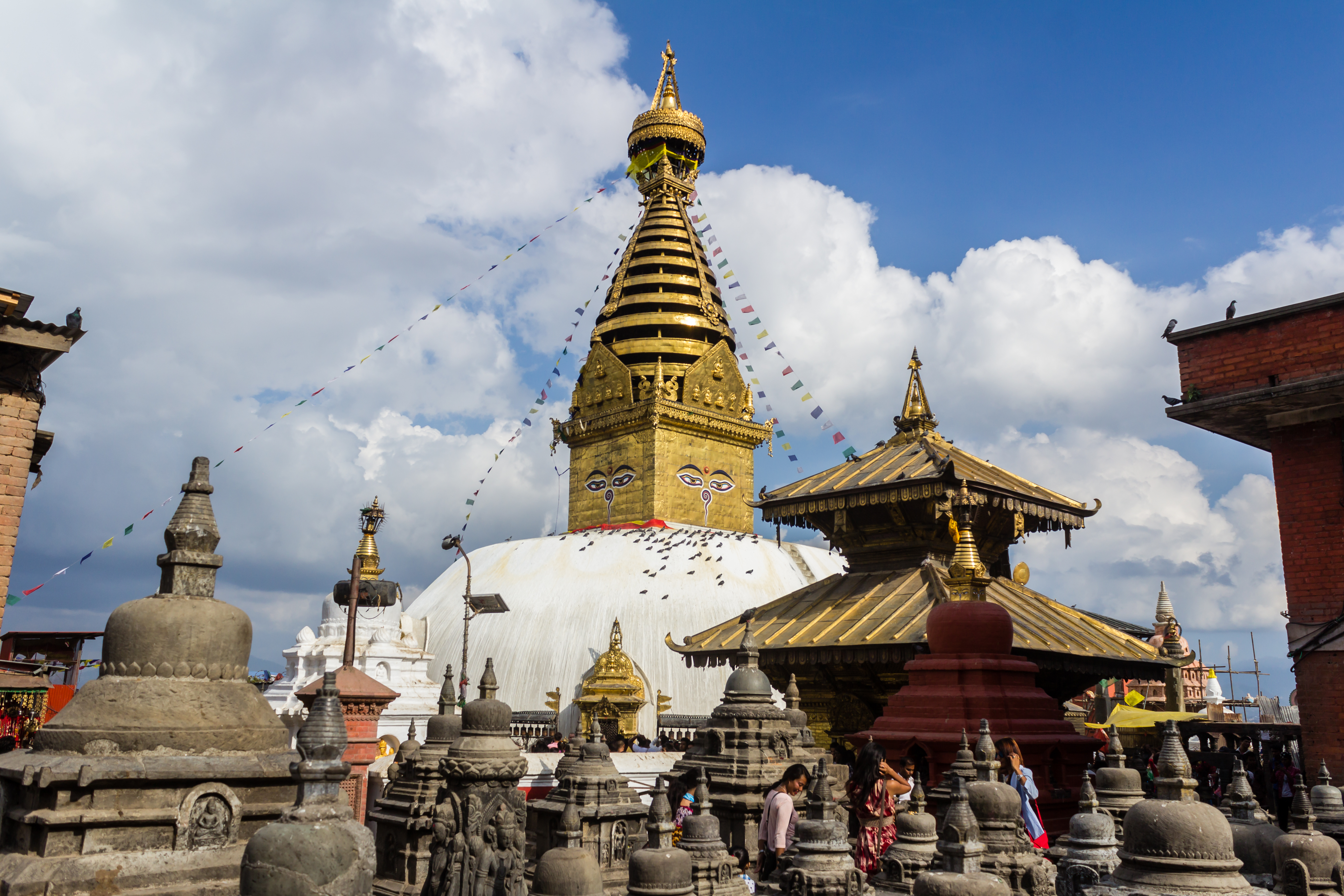
Beau informed the celebrities that they were still racing at Swayambhunath.

- Episode 2 (9 September 2025)
- Disqualified: Ant & Dan

Locations

- Sarangkot (Viewpoint)
- Sarangkot (ZipFlyer Nepal)
- Pokhara (Tree House Agro Resort)
- Pokhara (Pokhara International Airport) → Kathmandu (Tribhuvan International Airport)
- Kathmandu (WanderThirst Hostel)
- Kathmandu (Shree Gha Temple)
- Kathmandu (Swayambhunath)

Episode summary

- In this season's first Roadblock, one team member had to ride down the world's steepest zipline at speeds of up to 140 kilometres per hour (87 mph) before receiving their next clue.
- In this leg's second Roadblock, the team member who did not perform the previous Roadblock had to seesaw their arms 13 times while balancing a pair of tingsha bells in their hands without making a sound to receive their next clue.
- After the second Roadblock, teams had to book one of two flights to Kathmandu. Once there, teams had to spend the night at the WanderThirst Hostel, where the first four teams received private rooms and the remaining teams slept in shared dormitories.
- This leg's Detour was a choice between Fur or Feast. In Fur, teams had to take part in a Kukur Tihar tradition and make flower garlands for a pair of dogs before receiving their next clue. In Feast, both team members had to eat a bowl of two Newari delicacies – buffalo spinal cord and buffalo stomach filled with bone marrow – before receiving their next clue.
- After the Detour, teams had to check in at the Pit Stop: Swayambhunath.

Additional notes

- Following an off-camera breach in the show's code of conduct by Dan Middleton during the Pit Stop, he and Ant were removed from the competition.
- There was no elimination at the end of this leg; all teams were instead instructed to continue racing.

=== Leg 3 (Nepal) ===
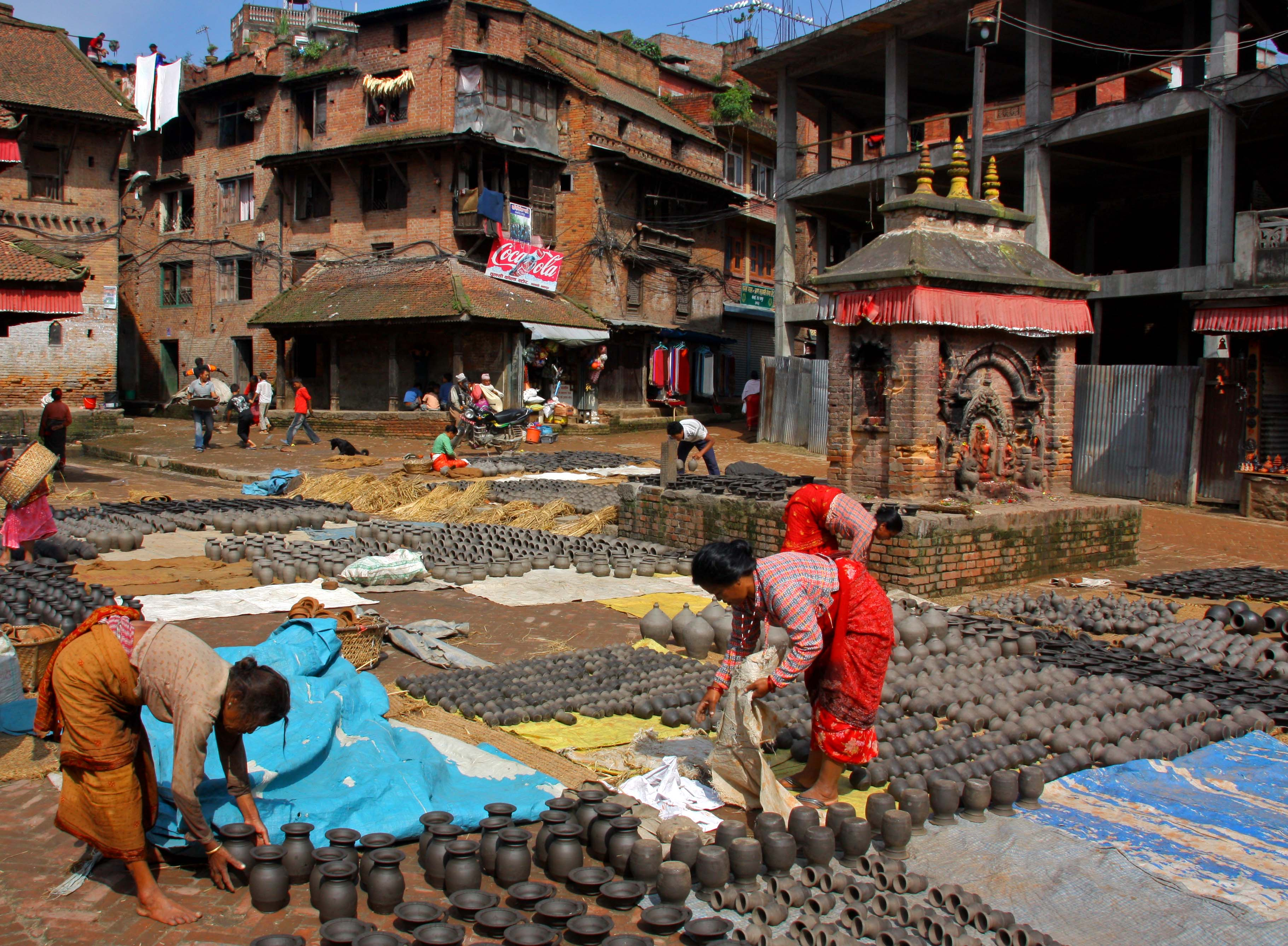
Racers had to make a clay bowl at Pottery Square for the Roadblock in Bhaktapur.

- Episode 3 (10 September 2025)
- Eliminated: Bronte & Benfield

Locations

- Lalitpur (Patan Durbar Square – Manga Hiti)
- Bhaktapur (Pottery Square)
- Bhaktapur (Golmadhi or Bhaktapur Durbar Square)
- Bhaktapur (Nyatapola Temple)

Episode summary

- At the start of this leg, teams had to travel to Patan Durbar Square, fill two bowls with water from a fountain and follow the green street poles to a community courtyard. There, teams had to fill a bucket up to the marked line to receive their next clue.
- For their Speed Bump, Steph & Ben had to deliver water using bowls with holes in them.
- In this leg's Roadblock, one team member had to make a clay bowl using a potter's wheel at Pottery Square to receive their next clue.
- This leg's Detour was a choice between Brush On or Brush Off. In Brush On, teams had to sand down and repaint a door near Golmadhi to receive their next clue. In Brush Off, teams had to find Bhaktapur Durbar Square and clean 55 roof tiles for a temple undergoing reconstruction following the April 2015 Nepal earthquake before receiving their next clue.
- After the Detour, teams had to check in at the Pit Stop: Nyatapola Temple.

=== Leg 4 (Nepal → Uzbekistan) ===
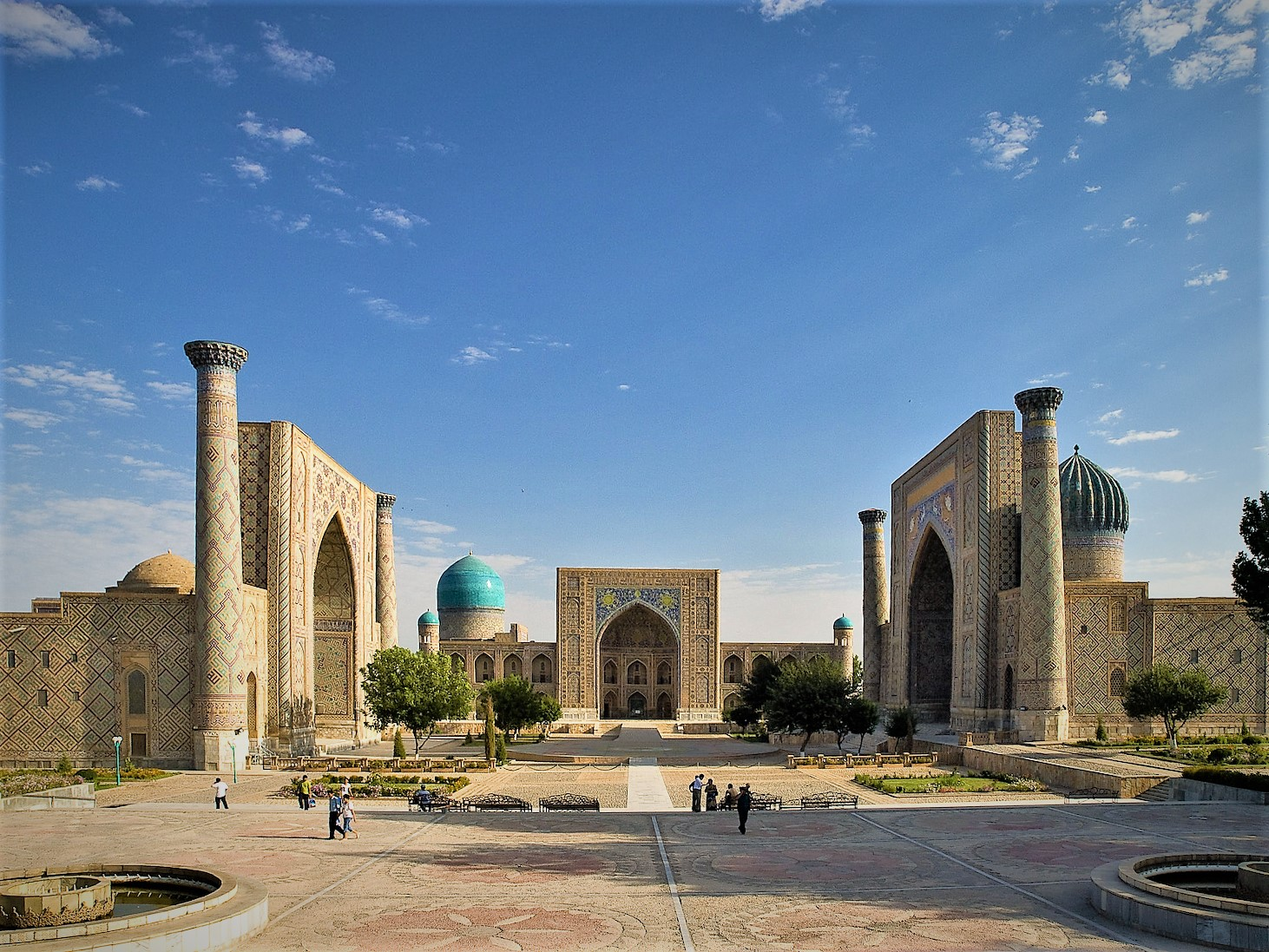
The first ever task in Uzbekistan took place at the Registan.

- Episode 4 (14 September 2025)
- Eliminated: Steph & Ben

Locations

- Kathmandu (Tribhuvan International Airport) → Samarkand, Uzbekistan (Samarkand International Airport)
- Samarkand (Registan)
- Samarkand (Siyob Bazaar)
- Samarkand (Samarkand Regional Puppet Theater)
- Samarkand (Ulugh Beg Observatory)

Episode summary

- At the start of this leg, teams were instructed to fly to Samarkand, Uzbekistan. Once there, teams had to travel to the Registan, where they had to eat a loaf of Samarkand non and a side dish of fat called qurdiuq to receive their next clue.
- This leg's Detour was a choice between Fruit or Veg. In Fruit, teams had to press, bottle and sell pomegranate juice until they earned 200,000 sum (approximately A$25) to receive their next clue. In Veg, teams had to sort and stack four varieties of vegetables to a specified height so as to recreate a vegetable stall to receive their next clue.
- After the Detour, teams had to travel to the Samarkand Regional Puppet Theatre and encountered an Intersection, which required two teams to mutually join together to complete the following task. Teams had to perform an Andijan polka to receive their next clue. The teams were paired up thusly: Brendan & Leni and Dom & Marx, Aesha & Scott and Gretel & Epiphany, Rob & Georgie and Melissa & Leah, Luke & Scott and Steve & Bernie, Lindy & Stella and Steph & Ben.
- After the Intersection, teams had to check in at the Pit Stop: the Ulugh Beg Observatory.

=== Leg 5 (Uzbekistan) ===
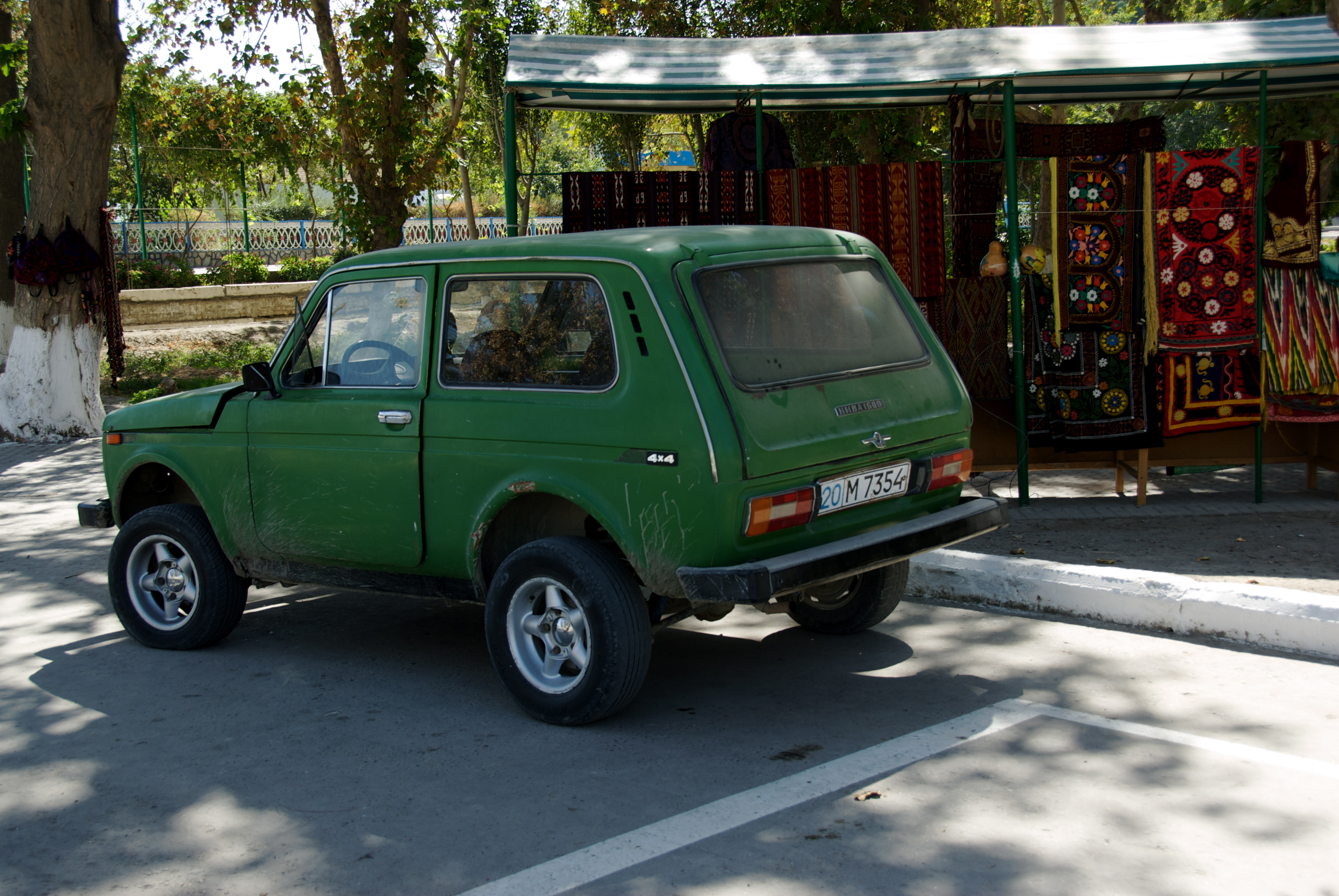
The Roadblock had racers unlocking a Soviet-era Lada that they needed to drive to the Pit Stop.

- Episode 5 (15 September 2025)

Locations

- Samarkand (Zarafshan Basin Irrigation Systems Authority Building)
- Oqdaryo (Eco Dry Food)
- Samarkand (Buyuk Ipak Yo'li Street Apartment Blocks)
- Samarkand (Aquapark Sogdiana)

Episode summary

- At the start of this leg, teams were instructed to travel to Eco Dry Food, where they had to collect and destalk one kilogram of raisins before receiving their next clue.
- This leg's Detour was a choice between Fix Up or Fill Up. In Fix Up, teams had to completely clean an Uzbek carpet before receiving their next clue. In Fill Up, teams had to eat their way through 30 bowls of sumalak until they found seven Cyrillic letters. Teams then had to unscramble the letters and spell sumalak in Uzbek Cyrillic – Сумалак – to receive their next clue.
- In this leg's Roadblock, one team member was provided a key ring with hundreds of keys and they had to find the one key that unlocked a garage shed containing a Lada Niva and their next clue.
- After the Roadblock, teams had to drive their Lada to the Pit Stop: the Aquapark Sogdiana.

Additional note

- This was a non-elimination leg.

=== Leg 6 (Uzbekistan) ===
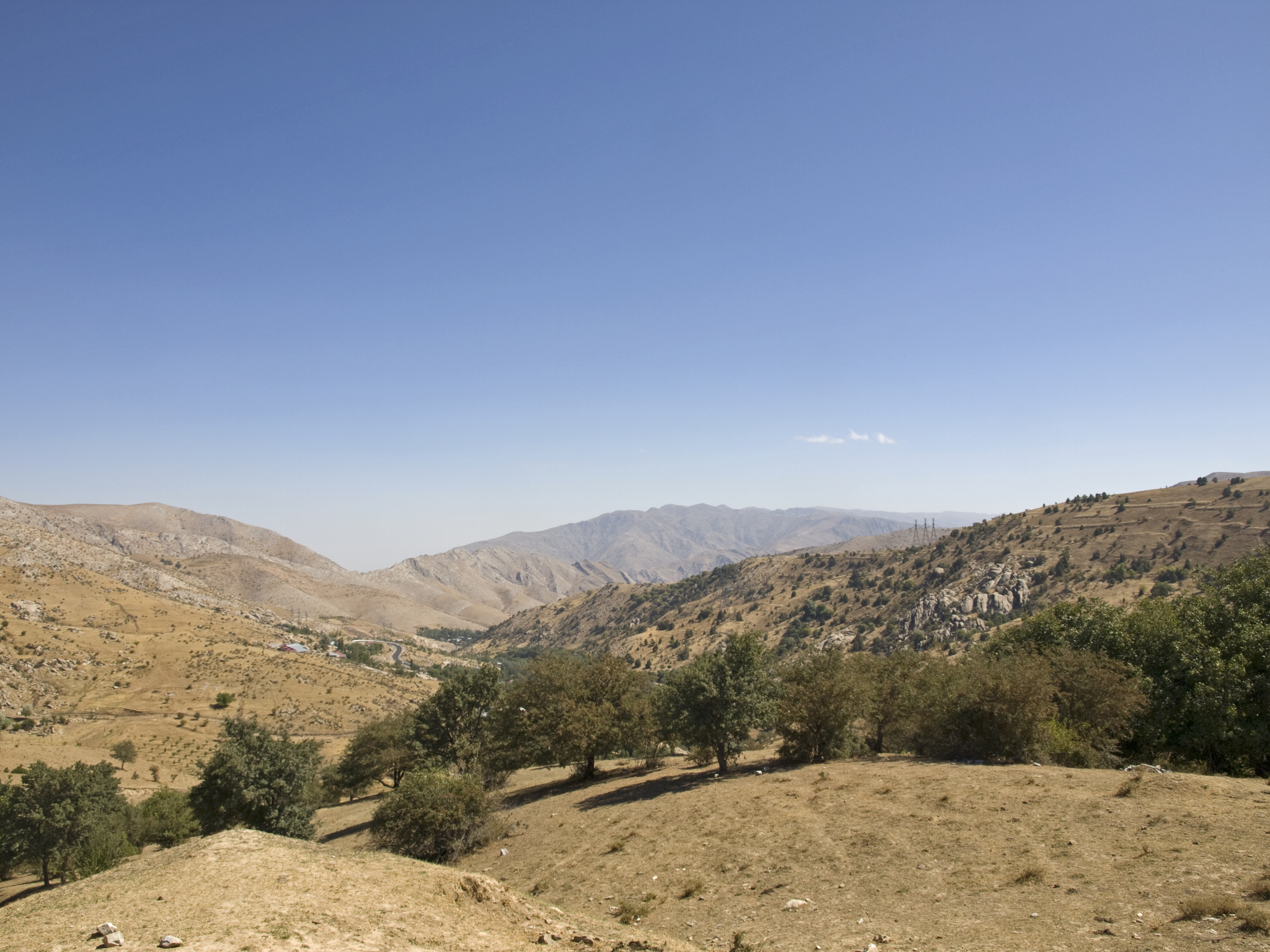
Teams ventured into the village of Tersak within the Zarafshan Range for the sixth leg.

- Episode 6 (21 September 2025)
- Eliminated: Dom & Marx

Locations

- Samarkand (Avto Ehtiyot Qismlar)
- Tersak (Mountain Stream)
- Tersak (Khaqberdy's Potato Farm)
- Tersak (Stable)
- Tersak (Muhyiddin's Farm)

Episode summary

- At the start of this leg, teams were instructed to drive to the village of Tersak.
- For their Speed Bump, Brendan & Leni had to find their keys hidden somewhere in their car.
- This leg's Detour was a choice between Balls or Guts, each with a limit of five stations. In Balls, both team members had to roll 50 cheese balls called qurut before receiving their next clue. In Guts, teams had to clean sheep intestines in a stream before receiving their next clue.
- After the Detour, teams had to plant a row of seed potatoes and fertilise the row with cow dung before receiving their next clue. Teams then had to lead a donkey to a stable before receiving their next clue.
- In this leg's Roadblock, one team member had to perform a tune on a karnay before receiving their next clue, which directed them to the Pit Stop: Muhyiddin's Farm.

=== Leg 7 (Uzbekistan → Sri Lanka) ===
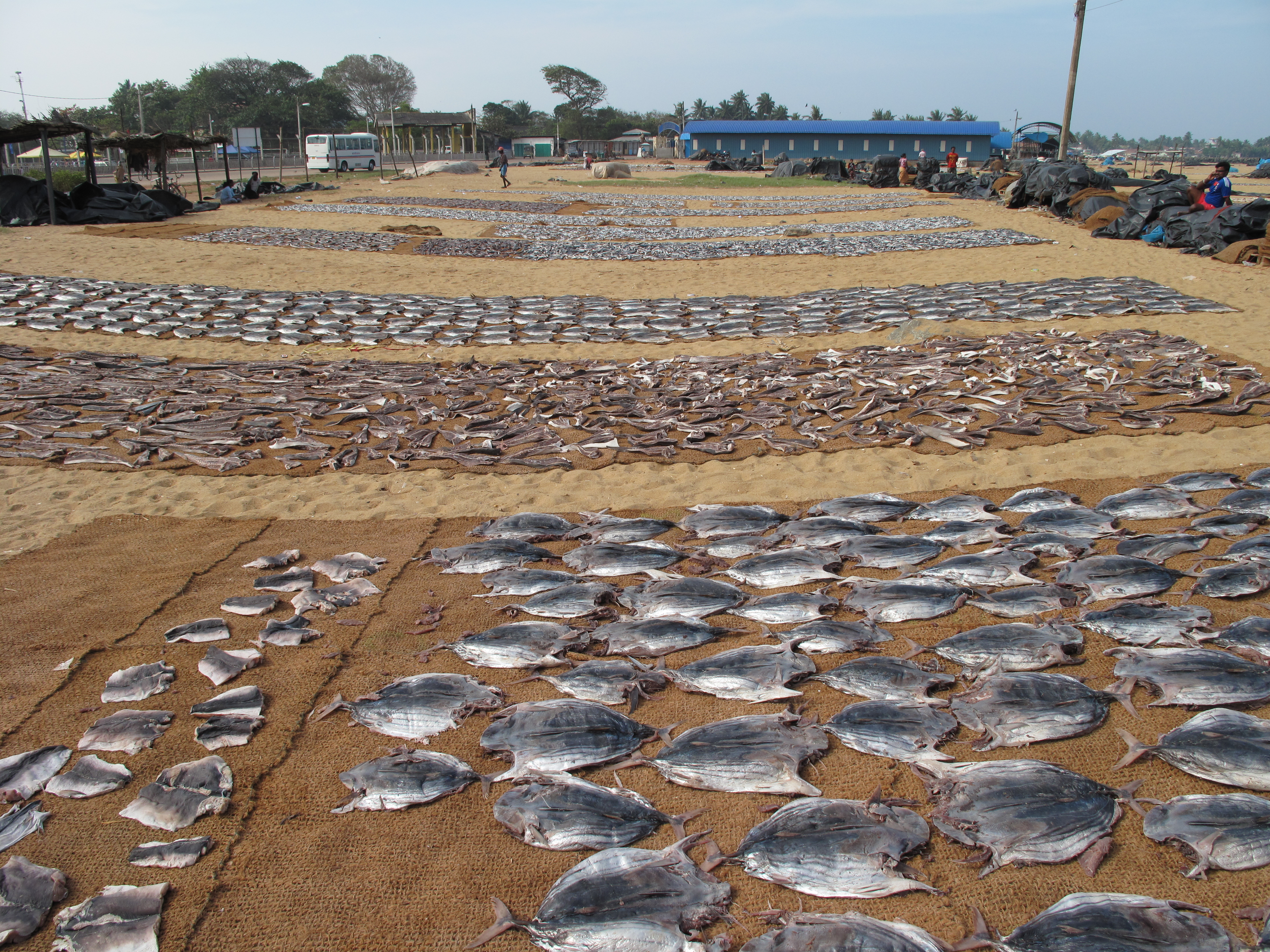
For one Detour option in Negombo, teams had to lay out fish to dry on the beach.

- Episode 7 (22 September 2025)
- Withdrew: Brendan & Leni
- Medically removed: Lindy & Stella

Locations

- Tersak (Muhyiddin's Farm)
- Samarkand (Samarkand International Airport) → Colombo, Sri Lanka (Bandaranaike International Airport)
- Negombo (Negombo Beach)
- Negombo (Negombo Fish Market)
- Negombo (Morawala Beach)
- Negombo (Aruthini Beach)

Episode summary

- At the start of this leg, teams were instructed to fly to Colombo, Sri Lanka. Once there, teams had to travel to Negombo Beach, push an oruwa into the Indian Ocean, sail to a buoy and dive down to their next clue.
- This leg's Detour was a choice between Wet or Dry. In Wet, teams had to gut four baskets of fish before receiving their next clue. In Dry, teams had to lay out four barrels of fish to dry before receiving their next clue.
- In this leg's Roadblock, one team member had to completely untangle a fishing net before receiving their next clue, which directed them to the Pit Stop: Aruthini Beach.

Additional notes

- Once in Sri Lanka, Leni became ill leaving Brendan to run the leg by himself. Once at the Pit Stop, Brendan chose to withdraw from the race.
- During the Detour, Stella developed heat exhaustion and had to receive medical treatment. Beau then informed Lindy & Stella that they were eliminated.
- There was no rest period at the end of the leg and all remaining teams were instead instructed to continue racing.

=== Leg 8 (Sri Lanka) ===
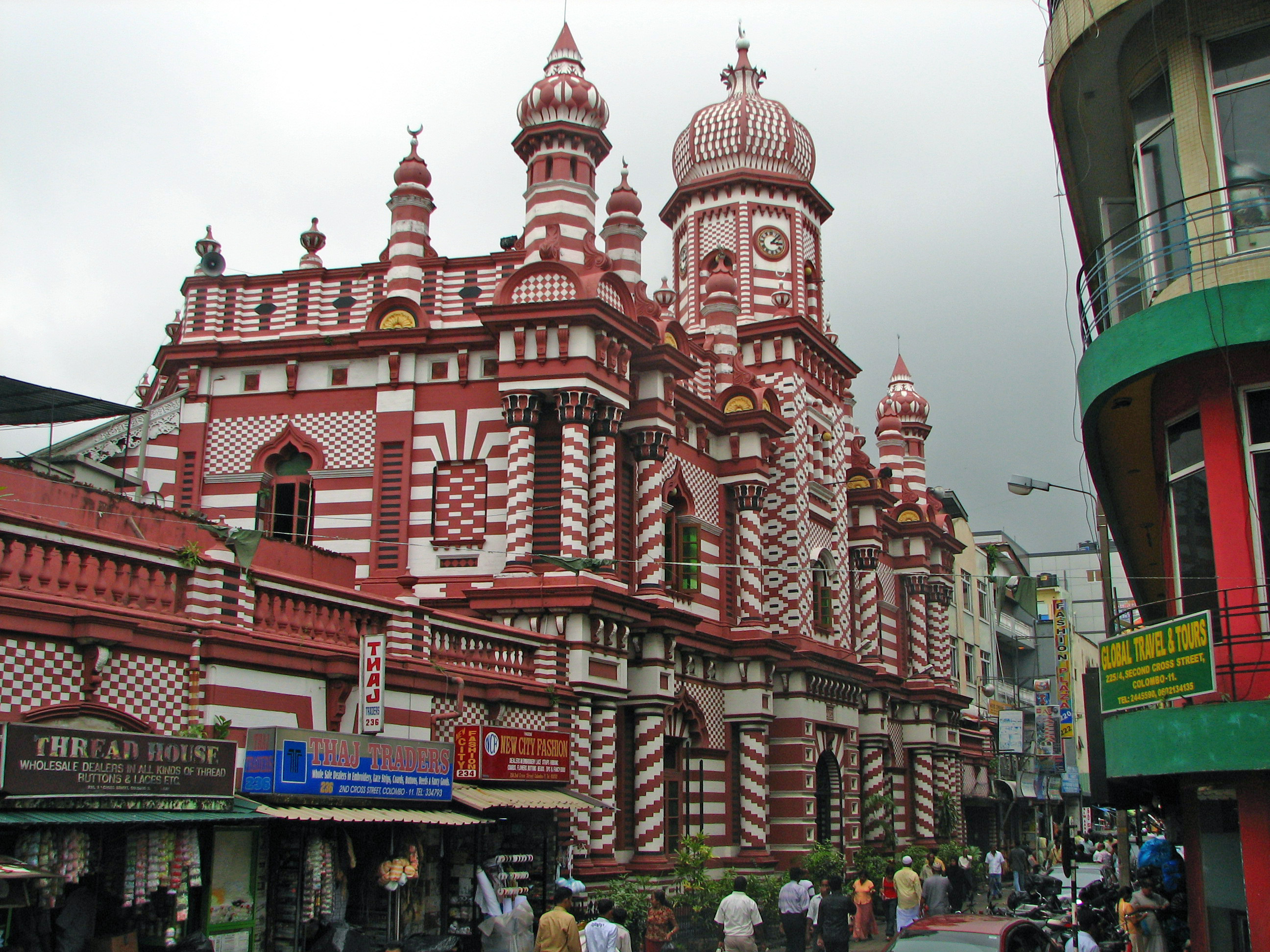
Once in Colombo, teams found their first clue at the Jami Ul-Alfar Mosque.

- Episode 8 (28 September 2025)

Locations

- Negombo (Aruthini Beach) → Colombo (Jami Ul-Alfar Mosque)
- Colombo (Pettah Market)
- Colombo (142 4th Cross Street)
- Colombo (Galle Face Hotel or Galle Face Beach)
- Colombo (Viharamahadevi Park)
- Colombo (Galle Face Green)

Episode summary

- At the start of this leg, teams were instructed to travel by bus to the Jami Ul-Alfar Mosque and find their next clue. Teams then had to load a trolley with 12 jackfruit at Pettah Market and deliver them to a shop at 142 4th Cross Street to receive their next clue.
- This leg's Detour was a choice between Cuppa or Cracker. In Cuppa, teams had to memorise a Ceylon tea order from six hotel guests. Then, teams had to identify the correct teas by smell and taste from eight unlabelled teas and serve them to the guests before receiving their next clue. In Cracker, teams had to cook eight servings of street food called egg hoppers before receiving their next clue.
- After the Detour, teams had to travel to Viharamahadevi Park and play a Sinhalese New Year game of Kana Mutti Bindima. One team member was blindfolded and had to smash 100 hanging pots under the direction of their partner until they found one with yellow-coloured water and a miniature Amazing Race clue, which they could exchange for their next clue. Teams then had to travel to the Pit Stop: Galle Face Green.

Additional note

- This was a non-elimination leg.

=== Leg 9 (Sri Lanka) ===
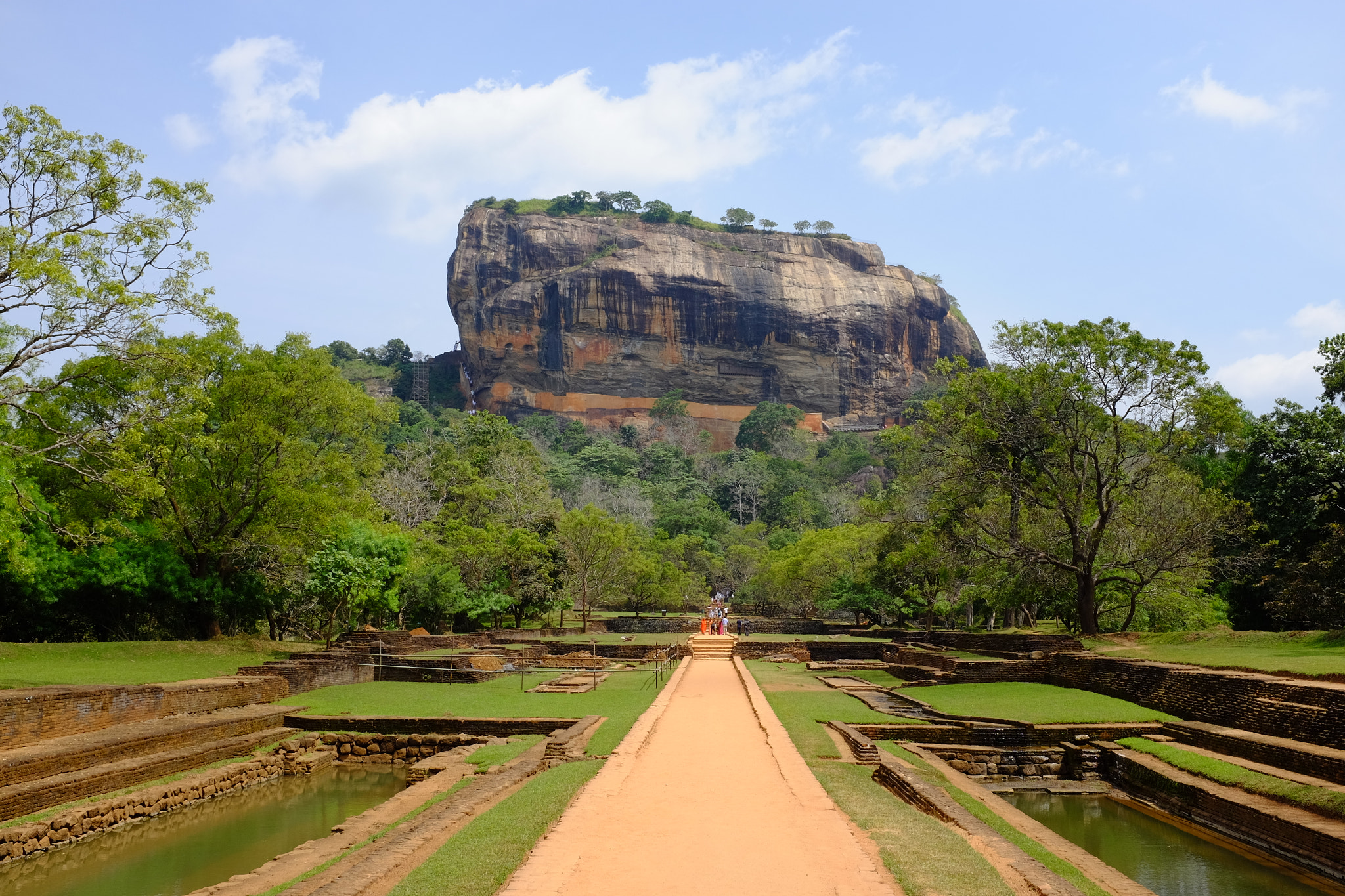
The ninth leg was set in the ancient city of Sigiriya.

- Episode 9 (29 September 2025)
- Eliminated: Melissa & Leah

Locations

- Colombo (Colombo Main Road)
- Colombo (Kollupitiya Railway Station) → Kurunegala (Kurunegala Railway Station)
- Sigiriya (Lion Rock)
- Sigiriya (Sigiriya Moat)
- Sigiriya (Prince Villa Sigiriya)
- Habarana (Hiriwadunna Village)
- Sigiriya (Pidurangala Ruins)

Episode summary

- At the start of this leg, teams were instructed to travel by train to Sigiriya and then climb to the top of Lion Rock to find their next clue. Teams then had descend the rock and find a snake charmer at Sigriya Moat. There, one team member had to play a pungi to distract a cobra while their partner retrieved a token from the cobra's basket to receive their next clue. For the remainder of the leg, teams had to drive an auto rickshaw.
- For their Speed Bump, Aesha & Scott had to change a flat tyre on their auto rickshaw before they could continue racing.
- This leg's Detour was a choice between Fire Dance or Fire Mask. In Fire Dance, teams had to perform the Gini Sisila fire dance before receiving their next clue. In Fire Mask, one team member had to paint a raksha mask while their partner painted their face before receiving their next clue.
- After the Detour, teams had to check in at the Pit Stop: the Pidurangala Ruins.

Additional note

- Steve & Bernie elected to quit the Detour and had to wait out a 30-minute penalty before they could continue racing.

=== Leg 10 (Sri Lanka → Taiwan) ===
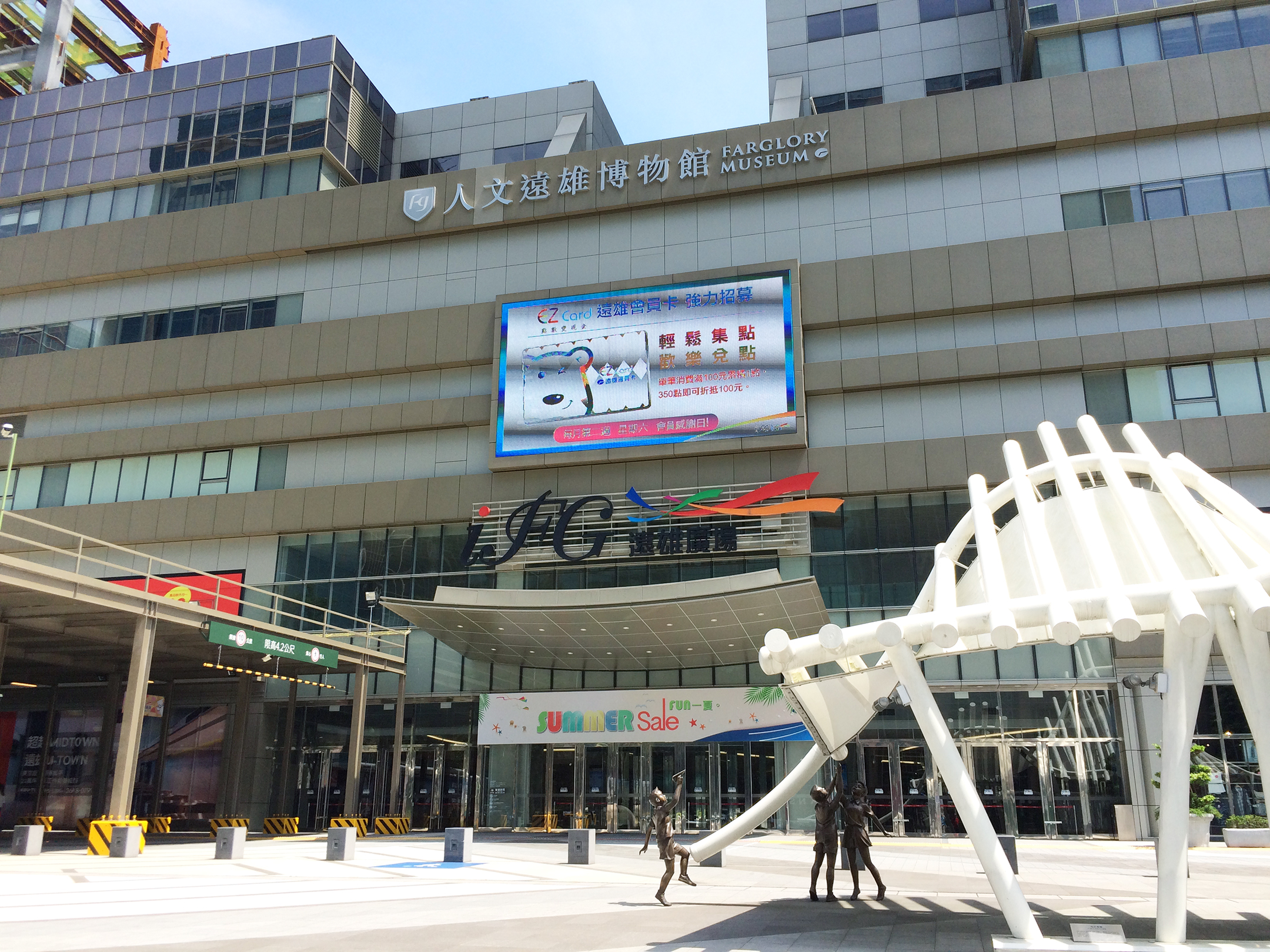
The first ever Face Off for The Amazing Race Australia was at iFG Farglory Square.

- Episode 10 (5 October 2025)

Locations

- Sigiriya (Sigiriya Moat)
- Colombo (Bandaranaike International Airport) → Taipei, Taiwan (Taiwan Taoyuan International Airport)
- Taipei (Taipei 101/World Trade Center Metro Station → NTU Hospital Metro Station)
- Taipei (228 Peace Memorial Park)
- Taipei (iFG Farglory Square)
- Taipei (Breeze Xinyi)
- Taipei (Taipei Cinema Park)

Episode summary

- At the start of this leg, teams were instructed to fly to Taipei, Taiwan. Once there, teams had to travel by Taipei Metro to the NTU Hospital metro station and search for their next clue.
- In this leg's Roadblock, one team member had to walk barefoot down a reflexology stone path with their backpack on and point to the heart pressure point on a woman's foot to receive their next clue.
- For this season's only Face Off, two teams had to compete against each other in a game of augmented reality dodgeball. Racers had to don head-mounted displays and toss virtual balls at their opponents. The team that scored more hits after 80 seconds received their next clue, while the losing team had to wait for another team. The last remaining team had to wait out a five-minute penalty.
- This leg's Detour was a choice between Sing It or Shake It. In Sing It, teams had to don historical outfits and sing karaoke to a Taiwanese folk song before receiving their next clue. In Shake It, teams had to perform a K-pop dance routine before receiving their next clue.
- After the Detour, teams had to check in at the Pit Stop: Taipei Cinema Park.

Additional notes

- AI VTuber Ubi-chan appeared as the Pit Stop greeter during this leg.
- There was no elimination at the end of this leg; all teams were instead instructed to continue racing.

=== Leg 11 (Taiwan) ===
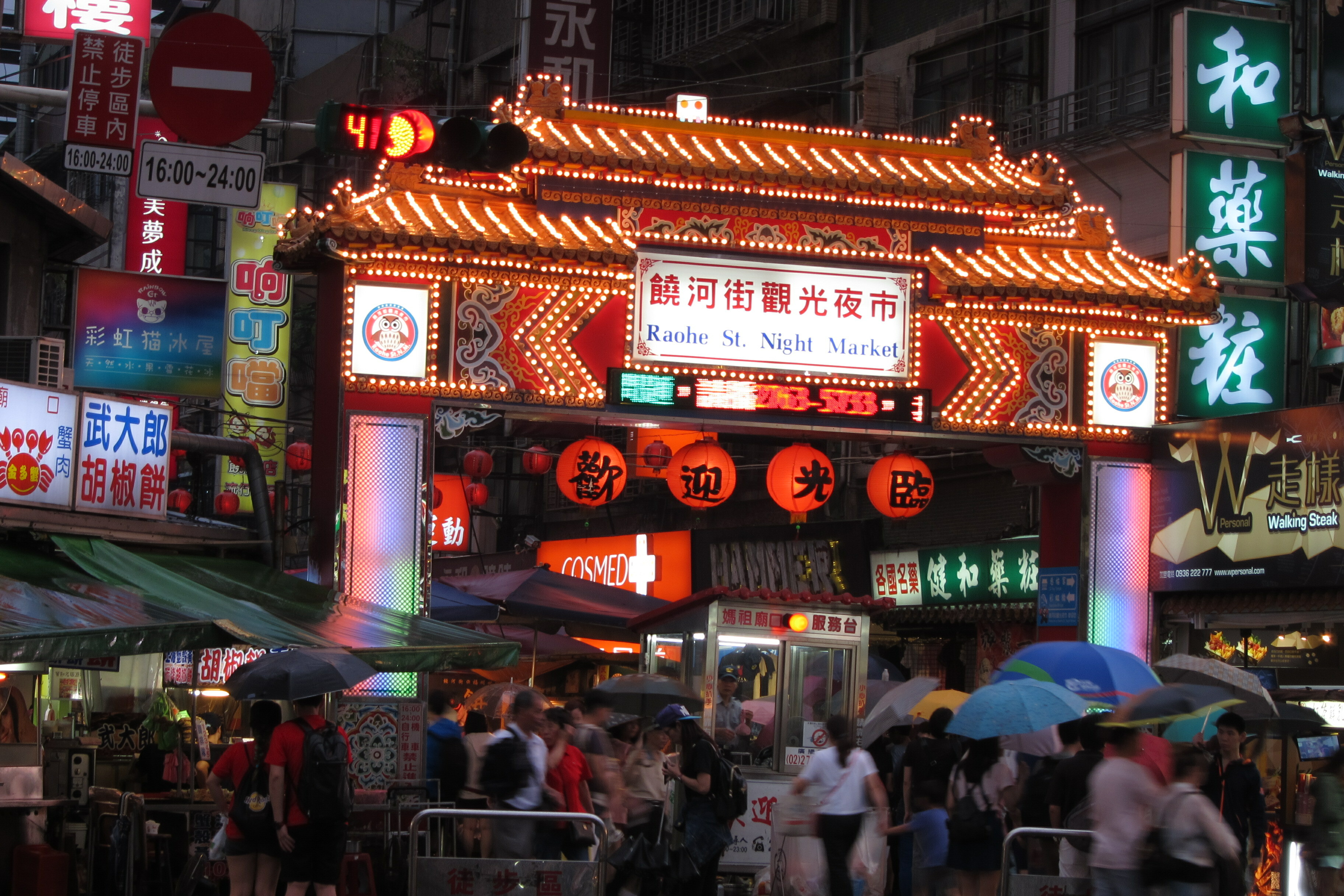
After night fell in the city of Taipei, teams encountered a Detour at the Raohe Street Night Market.

- Episode 11 (6 October 2025)

Locations

- Taipei (Ciyou Temple)
- Taipei (Raohe Street Night Market)
- Taipei (Intersection of Wuchang Street and Kunming Street)
- Taipei (Ximending Walking District)
- Taipei (Rainbow Six)

Episode summary

- At the start of this leg, teams were instructed to find their next clue by the Ciyou Temple.
- For their Speed Bump, Gretel & Epiphany had to find a person to translate their Detour clue from Taiwanese Mandarin to English.
- This leg's Detour was a choice between Beards or Birds. In Beards, teams had to make 18 pieces of dragon's beard candy before receiving their next clue. In Birds, both team members had to eat a bowl of duck blood stinky tofu and share a plate of chicken comb, duck heart and duck tongue to receive their next clue.
- After the Detour, teams were told to find Beau at the intersection of Wuchang Street and Kunming Street. There, teams had to figure out that Beau was on an electronic billboard that pointed to a nearby arcade, where they had to play a claw machine game and retrieve a ball with their next clue. However, only a few balls contained the clue, while the remaining balls had envelopes that told teams to try again.
- In this leg's Roadblock, one team member had to figure out the name of the chief Electric-Techno Neon God. Racers had to search among the twenty Techno Gods in Ximending for the one – Nezha – with the same two emojis on its scrolling LED sign as the chief Techno God's. After racers bowed, danced, and gave the correct name to the chief Techno God, they received their next clue, which directed them to the Pit Stop: the Rainbow Six crossing on Ximending, Wanhua District.

Additional note

- This was a non-elimination leg.

=== Leg 12 (Taiwan) ===
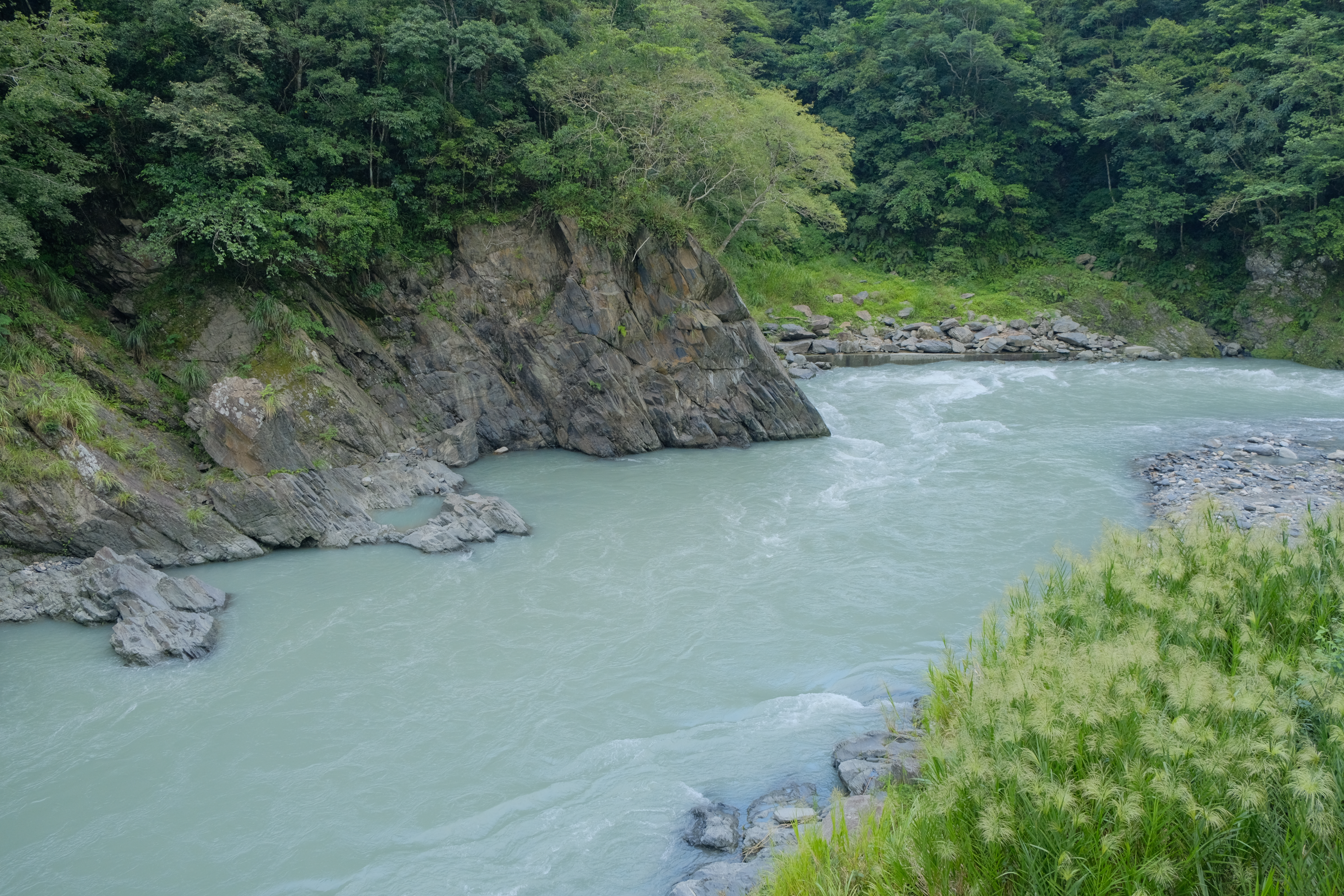
The twelfth Pit Stop was located along the Nanshi River in the Wulai District.

- Episode 12 (12 October 2025)
- Prize: A stay at a hotel suite during the Pit Stop (awarded to Steve & Bernie)
- Eliminated: Gretel & Epiphany

Locations

- Taipei (Howard Plaza Hotel Taipei)
- Wulai District (Jiajiuliao River)
- Wulai District (Fushan Village)
- Wulai District (Fushan Elementary School)
- Wulai District (Nanshi River or Delanan Cultural Camp)
- Wulai District (Nanshi River)

Episode summary

- At the start of this leg, teams were instructed to drive to the Jiajiuliao River in Wulai and search for their next clue.
- For their Speed Bump, Steve & Bernie both had to eat a serving of jutongfan – a Tayal dish of sticky rice cooked in bamboo – before they could continue racing.
- Teams had to trek up the Jiajiuliao River to a waterfall and retrieve their next clue from behind the falls.
- In this leg's Roadblock, one team member had to search a village for a house with a mural of a married couple, translate the house's street number from Tayal to English and reiterate the number to a judge in exchange for their next clue.
- After the Roadblock, teams had to travel to the Fushan Elementary School and spin a giant spinning top for 15 seconds before receiving their next clue.
- This leg's Detour was a choice between Tribal Trap or Tribal Tap, each with a limit of three stations. In Tribal Trap, teams had to retrieve a broken bamboo fishing trap from the Nanshi River and repair it before receiving their next clue. In Tribal Tap, teams had to don Tayal clothing and perform a bamboo stepping dance before receiving their next clue.
- After the Detour, teams had to check in at the Pit Stop: the Nanshi River.

=== Leg 13 (Taiwan → Indonesia) ===
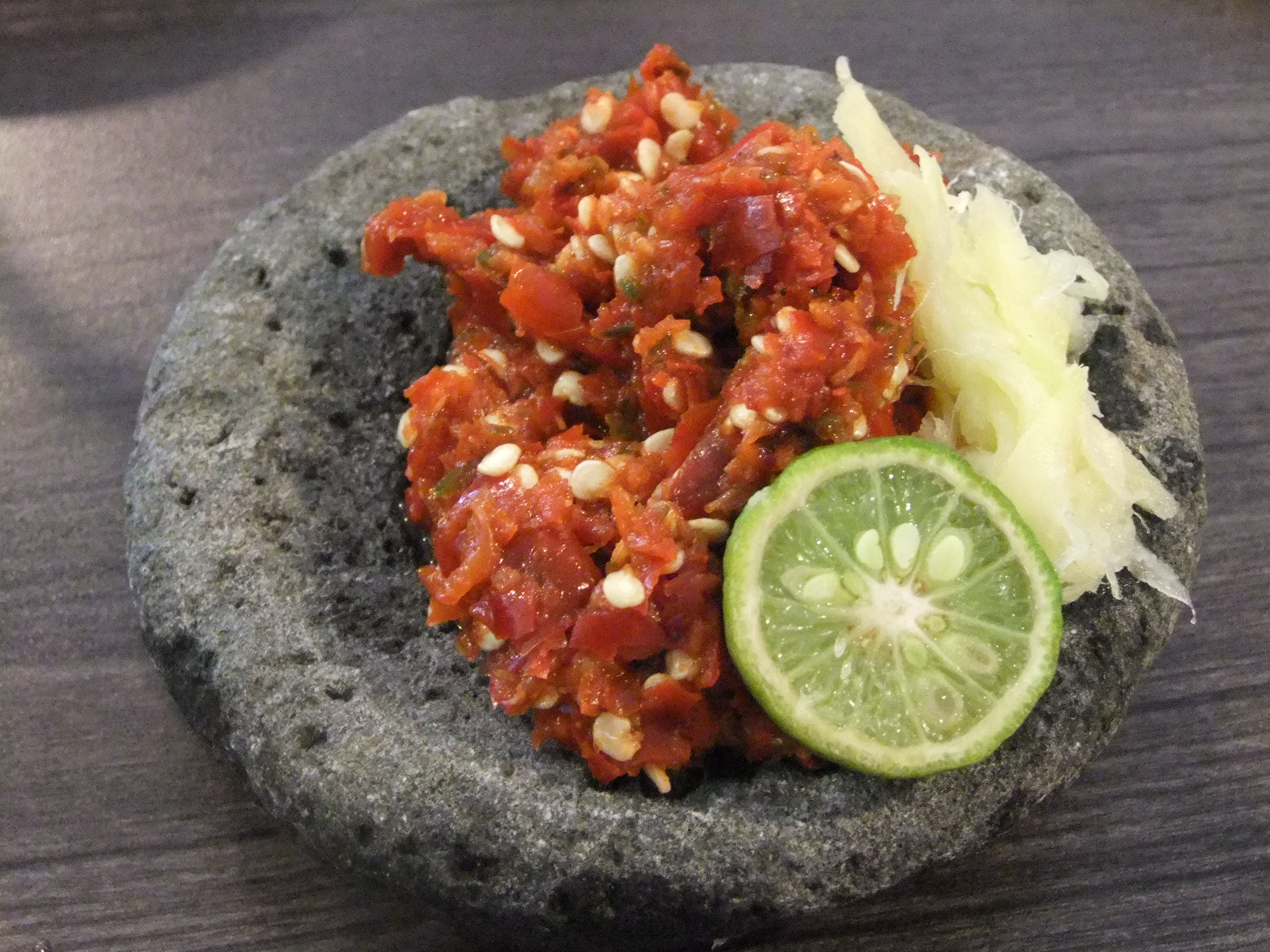
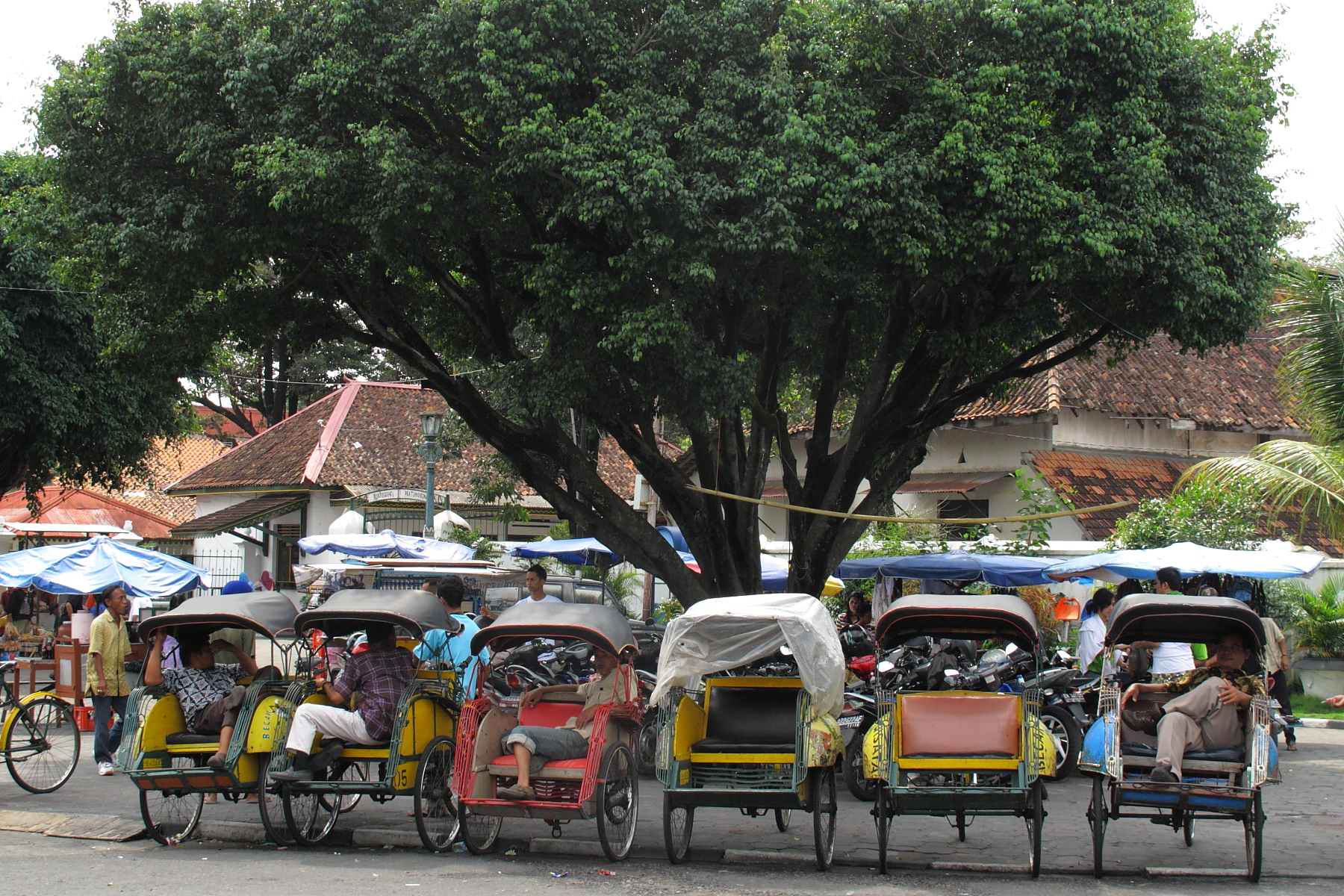
Teams could either prepare a dish called sambal or pedal a local home on a becak during the Detour in Yogyakarta.
- Episode 13 (13 October 2025)

Locations

- Taipei (Taiwan Taoyuan International Airport) → Yogyakarta, Indonesia (Yogyakarta International Airport)
- Yogyakarta (Pasar Ngasem)
- Yogyakarta (Ramayana Ballet Purawisata)
- Yogyakarta (Minggiran Field)
- Yogyakarta (nDalem Ngabean)

Episode summary

- At the start of this leg, teams were instructed to fly to Yogyakarta, Indonesia, on the island of Java. Once there, teams found their next clue outside of Pasar Ngasem.
- This leg's Detour was a choice between Grind or Gears. In Grind, teams had to grind chilli peppers into a paste called sambal and then both team members had to eat a bowl of sambal before receiving their next clue. In Gears, teams had to transport a local home using a becak. During their journey, both team members had to fulfill the roles of pedaling the bicycle and navigating using a map. Halfway to the local's home, teams had to stop at a cafe and purchase three cups of iced Java coffee. After completing their journey, teams received their next clue.
- After the Detour, teams had to travel to Ramayana Ballet Purawisata, where they had to memorise and play a tune on a saron and bonang alongside a group called a gamelan to receive their next clue.
- In this leg's Roadblock, one team member had to take part in an Independence Day tradition called panjat pinang. They had to climb a bamboo pole three times and retrieve a basket during each climb. The baskets contained the words Tempat Berhenti nDalem Ngabean, which teams had to figure out it translated to the location of the next Pit Stop as "stopping point nDalem Ngabean".

Additional note

- This was a non-elimination leg.

=== Leg 14 (Indonesia) ===
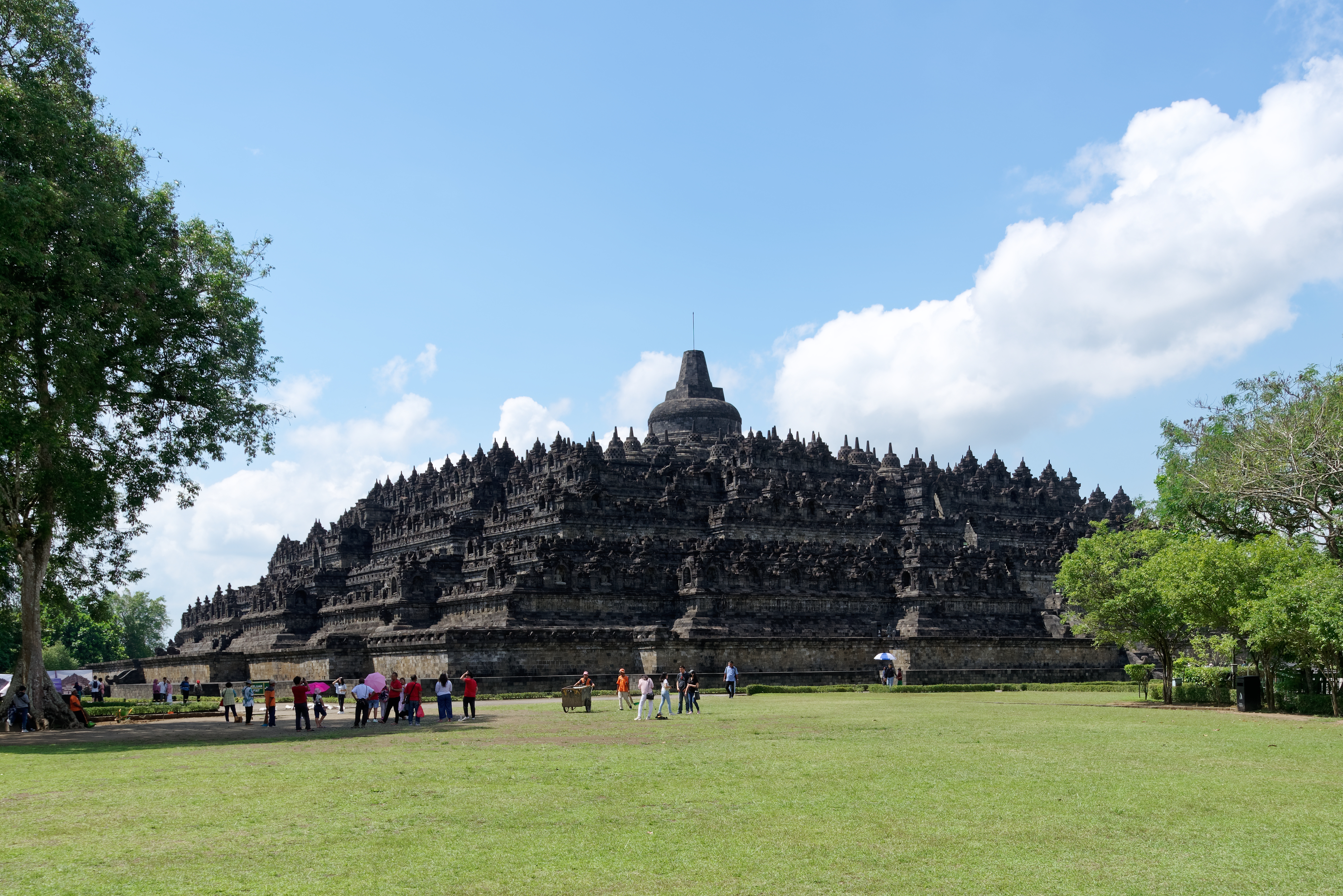
Teams visited Borobudur, the largest Buddhist temple in the world, during the penultimate leg.

- Episode 14 (19 October 2025)
- Eliminated: Luke & Scott

Locations

- Magelang (Borobudur)
- Nanggulan (Rice Fields)
- Sambeng (Progo Riverbank)
- Majaksingi (Watu Putih View)

Episode summary

- At the start of this leg, teams were instructed to travel to Borobudur, where they had to search the temple for the 25 lion statues and then plot each statue on a map before receiving their next clue. Teams then had to drive to the village of Nanggulan and then pedal a tandem bicycle to the rice fields to their next clue.
- For their Speed Bump, Luke & Scott had to trek on foot through the rice fields, find an Amazing Race flag and retrieve their next clue.
- In this season's final Roadblock, one team member had to catch 15 rice-paddy eels from a rice paddy to receive their next clue.
- This season's final Detour was a choice between Good Fortune or Good Focus, each with a limit of three stations. In Good Fortune, teams had to string together 200 pieces of fruits and vegetables and assemble an offering called a gunungan to receive their next clue. In Good Focus, teams had to perform a traditional form of Javanese archery called Jemparingan, where one team member had to hit a target with an arrow while sitting or kneeling to receive their next clue.
- After the Detour, teams had to check in at the Pit Stop: Watu Putih View.

=== Leg 15 (Indonesia) ===
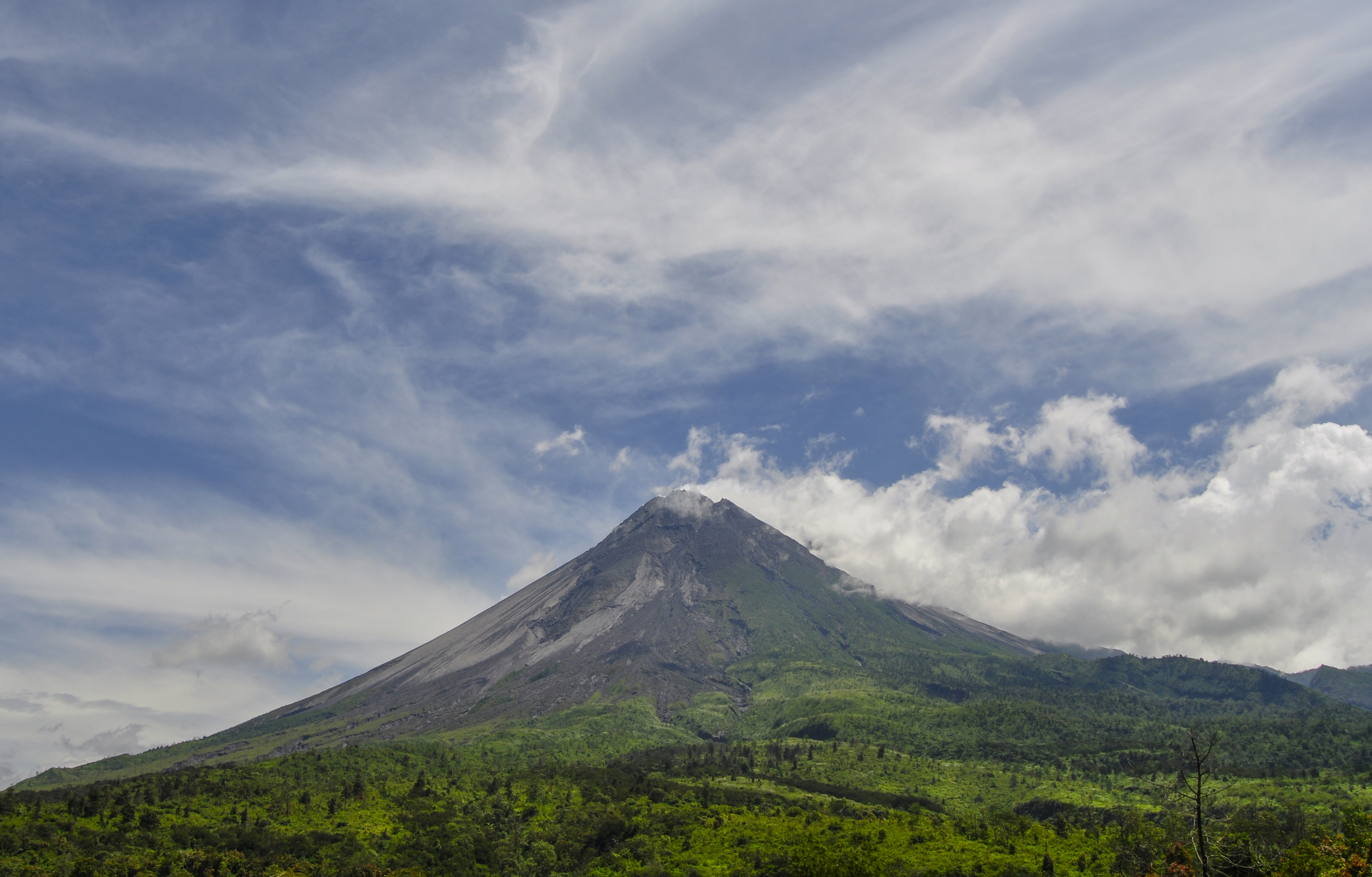
The final leg was set beneath Mount Merapi, the most active volcano in Indonesia.

- Episode 15 (20 October 2025)
- Prize: A$100,000 for the team's chosen charity
- Winners: Steve & Bernie
- Runners-up: Rob & Georgie
- Third place: Aesha & Scott

Locations

- Sambirejo (Sumberwatu Heritage Resort)
- Bugisan (Plaosan)
- Kaliurang (Mount Merapi Quarry)
- Klidon (BBPPMPV Seni dan Budaya)
- Glagaharjo (Teras Merapi)
- Sambirejo (Sumberwatu Heritage Resort)

Episode summary

- At the start of this leg, teams began simultaneously at the Sumberwatu Heritage Resort before driving to the Plaosan temple complex, where they had to take part in a kebo-keboan festival. Teams had to transfer handfuls of rice husks across a field while avoiding two men dressed as buffalo until they filled a basket to receive their next clue. Teams then had to drive to a quarry, where they had to split two volcanic rocks before receiving their next clue.
- From the quarry, teams had to drive to a theatre, where they had to perform a dance called Ratoh Jaroe in sync with a group of dancers before receiving their next clue. Teams then had to drive to Teras Merapi for their final memory task and had to arrange 14 dragon eggs, each of which displayed a symbol that were also displayed on the flags present at each Pit Stop, on a dragon boat in chronological order before receiving their final clue, which directed them to the finish line: the Sumberwatu Heritage Resort.

Correct answers
Leg	Symbol
1	Moon with rays
2	Om
3	Temple
4	Madrasa
5	Star and crescent
6	Yurt
7	Floral arrangement
8	Lion
9	Lotus
10	Blue Sky with a White Sun
11	New Taipei City seal
12	Waterfall
13	National emblem of Indonesia
14	Stupa

== Reception ==
=== Ratings ===
Week	Episode	Airdate	Timeslot	Overnight			7 Day Timeshift			Source
Week	Episode	Airdate	Timeslot	Reach viewers	Total viewers	Rank	Reach viewers	Total viewers	Rank	Source
1	1	8 September 2025	Monday 7:30 pm	1,337,000	684,000	9	1,733,000	1,009,000	6	
1	2	9 September 2025	Tuesday 7:30 pm	1,051,000	595,000	12	1,439,000	908,000	8	
1	3	10 September 2025	Wednesday 7:30 pm	971,000	545,000	13	1,321,000	832,000	10	
2	4	14 September 2025	Sunday 7:00 pm	1,007,000	548,000	10	1,333,000	817,000	7	
2	5	15 September 2025	Monday 7:30 pm	989,000	561,000	15	1,334,000	836,000	12	
3	6	21 September 2025	Sunday 7:00 pm	976,000	547,000	11	1,292,000	789,000	7	
3	7	22 September 2025	Monday 7:30 pm	980,000	540,000	14	1,315,000	808,000	11	
4	8	28 September 2025	Sunday 7:00 pm	888,000	528,000	11	1,208,000	773,000	8	
4	9	29 September 2025	Monday 7:30 pm	1,011,000	518,000	12	1,337,000	771,000	10	
5	10 (Note: Episode 10 aired the same night as the 2025 NRL Grand Final.)	5 October 2025	Sunday 7:00 pm	788,000	403,000	15	1,117,000	688,000	10	
5	11	6 October 2025	Monday 7:30 pm	943,000	489,000	15	1,279,000	750,000	12	
6	12	12 October 2025	Sunday 7:00 pm	964,000	550,000	10	1,281,000	809,000	10	
6	13	13 October 2025	Monday 7:30 pm	952,000	540,000	16	1,293,000	820,000	10	
7	14	19 October 2025	Sunday 7:00 pm	865,000	529,000	10	1,112,000	734,000	9	
7	15	20 October 2025	Monday 7:30 pm	1,119,000	663,000	11	1,353,000	868,000	11	
