= Zhen Tou =

Taiwanese folk art

Parade formations, also known as "Tīn-thâu" in Taiwanese Hokkien or "Zhen Tou" in Mandarin (陣頭), are a traditional folk art originating from China. As a part of worship activities and temple festivals, members of communities express gratitude to the gods by escorting them in a procession. This practice can be either performed while walking or in fixed locations along the streets, incorporating elements of acrobatics and folk dramas. The term “Zhen Tou” came from coastal regions like Fuzhou and Minnan in China. The folk art has flourished in Taiwan, particularly in the southern regions where the highest number and variety of Zhen Tou can be found.

== History and evolution ==
During the Ming and Qing dynasties, when Chinese people immigrated to Taiwan, they brought along with them their folk beliefs and Zhen Tou performances. As the times change, the influences of globalization and localization have allowed Zhen Tou diverse developments. For instance, during the period of Japanese rule in Taiwan, Japanese-style palanquins emerged; the 1960s to 1970s, influenced by popular culture, saw the emergence of performances like “Sulan's Wedding Parade” and “Filial Daughter Bai Qin.” In the 1980s, electronic floats became popular, and after 2000, traditional music for Zhen Tou gradually gave way to popular music. Electric-Techno Neon Gods performances emerged, and pole dancing gained popularity.

While the displays of Zhen Tou are gradually declining in urban areas of northern Taiwan, it is still thriving in the southern regions. As preserving and inheriting folk culture are being valued, Zhen Tou has found its way onto the stages of arts and cultural events, and it's being promoted on campuses as well.

== Characteristics ==
Zhen Tou performances reflect each distinct local social life and cultural tradition, which take place while in procession or in stationary locations such as streets or squares. The performances are relatively short with simple storylines, basic costumes, props, and music. The format is flexible, allowing for improvised performances in accordance with different venues or circumstances.

== Categorization ==
There are various types and formats of Zhen Tou in Taiwan, contributing to the intricacy of their categorization. The common categorizations include:

- Based on performance characteristics: literary parade formations (“Wen Zhen”) and martial parade formation (“Wu Zhen”).
  - “Wen Zhen” focuses on singing and dancing, often accompanied by relatively complete musical arrangements. Examples include " Niu Li Ge Zhen " (Plowing Ox Song Formation) and " Qian Wang Ge Zhen " (Guiding the Deceased Song Formation).
  - "Wu Zhen" usually involves martial arts performances with relatively basic musical accompaniments. Examples include Song Jiang Battle Array and dragon and lion dances.
- Based on personnel organization: community-based parade formations (“ Zhuang Tou Zhen”) and professional parade formations.
  - “Zhuang Tou Zhen” are amateur groups formed spontaneously by community residents based on blood or geographical relations, often trained by local temples.
  - Due to rural population outflows since the 1980s, forming Zhen Tou has become more challenging. As a response to temple festivals and celebratory events, there has been a rise in professional parade formations, which are professional performing groups catering to commercial events.
