= Lindy Klim =

Australian model

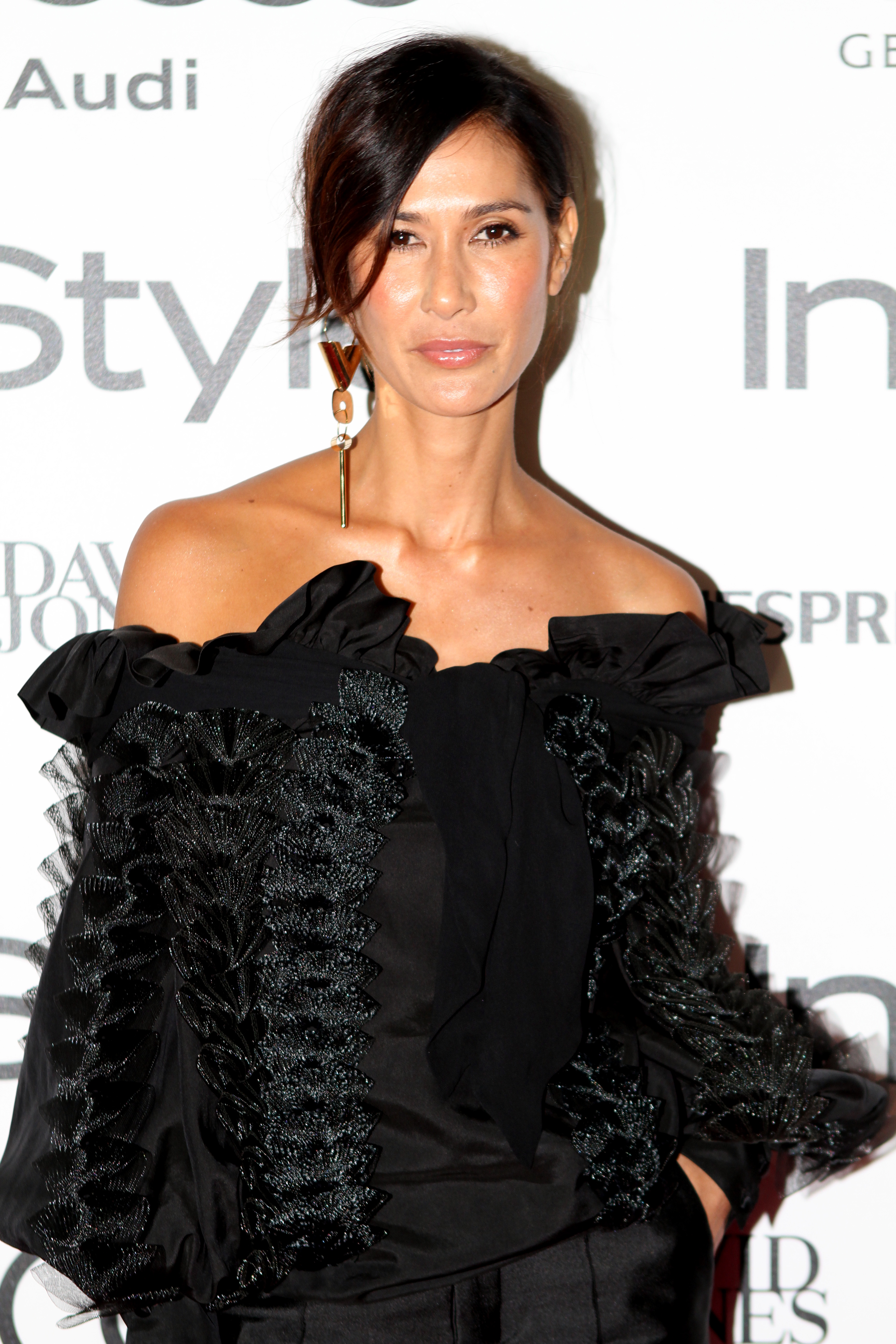
- Lindy in 2015
- Born: Lindy Rama; 18 December 1978 (age 47); Bali, Indonesia
- Other name: Lindy Rama-Ellis
- Occupation: Model
- Spouses: Michael Klim (m. 2006–2016) Adam Ellis (m. 2018; sep. 2024)
- Children: 4

Lindy Rama (born 18 December 1978), commonly known as Lindy Klim and formerly as Lindy Rama-Ellis, is an Indonesian-Australian model and entrepreneur.

== Early life ==
Rama's mother, Frances Parker, was a school teacher in Arnhem Land when she took a cheap holiday to Bali where she met Anak Agung Oka Rama. Rama was born a Balinese princess and grew up in a palace before moving to Tasmania with her mother after her parents divorced when she was three. Rama's uncle, Ida Cokorde Pamecutan XI, was the king of Denpasar and she stated that she didn't know she was part of the royal family because she didn't have much contact with her dad after the divorce.

Des, her maternal grandfather became like her father in Australia and often took her fishing and camping. Her stepfather Mike, came into her life when she was five and would often pick her up from dance lessons and school.

== Career ==
At the age of 20, Rama began modelling and walked in high-end fashion shows like Gucci and Chanel. She attended New York fashion week in 2008 representing top Australian designer, Toni Maticevski. Early in her career, Rama stated that she had a bad body image and dropped down to weigh just 42 kilograms at her lowest.

She is a regular attendee of both Sydney and Melbourne fashion weeks and has been an ambassador for "La Mer" and designed a collection with brand "Mercer + Reid".

Rama and Klim co-owned "Milk & Co" skin care. What started out as a men's range of products, Rama expanded the line to include a range for children.

In 2017, Rama launched a fashion label named "Rama Voyage".

In 2020, Rama launched "Fig Femme", a wellness brand that encourages open and honest self-care by selling items such as a vulva mask.

In 2025, Rama along with her daughter Stella Klim competed on Network 10's The Amazing Race Australia 9, where they were eliminated sixth due to Stella suffering from heat exhaustion in Sri Lanka.

== Personal life ==
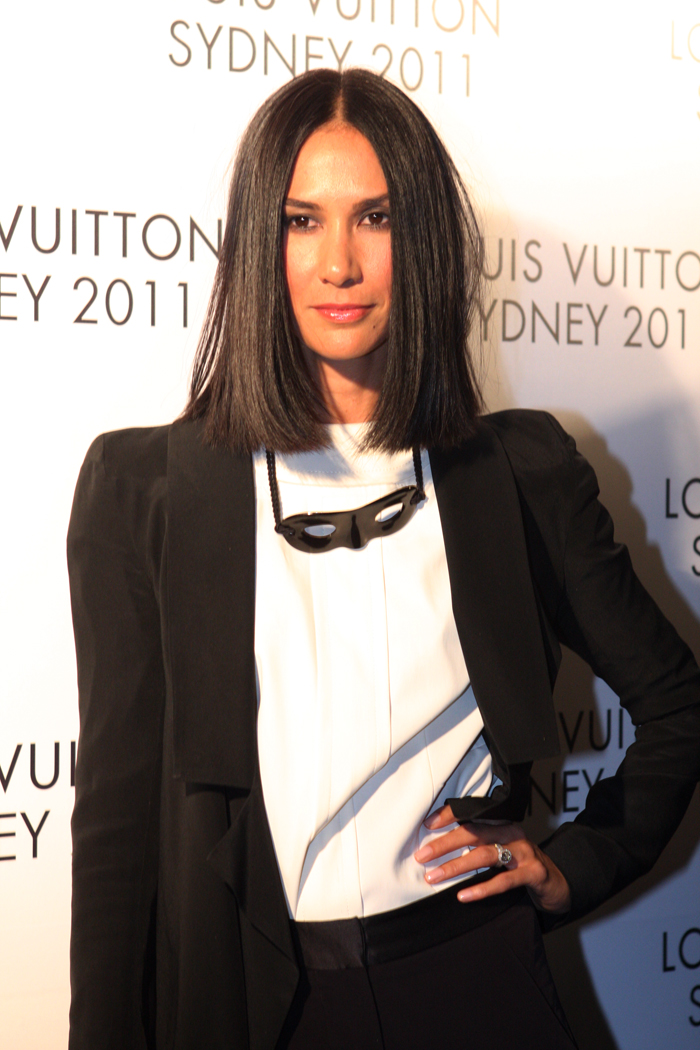
Rama in 2011

At 16, Rama started a relationship with musician and future contestant on The Voice, Cam Tapp who was 26 when they met. The couple were together for ten years and lived in South London for four years whilst Tapp pursued his career in music. After the 2004 Athens Olympics, Rama was a model for Myer when she met her future husband, Olympic swimmer Michael Klim on the catwalk. She credits her relationship with Klim for teaching her how to be confident. Rama married Michael Klim in 2006 and divorced in 2016. The couple have two daughters and a son together and spent much of their relationship living between Bali and Melbourne.

Two years after her divorce from Klim in August 2018, Rama remarried, to British property developer Adam Ellis, and the pair welcomed a daughter in December 2017. The couple married in 2018. In 2024, the pair separated.

Her father Oka Rama died of heart problems a few weeks after the birth of Rama's first child.

Rama has lent her support to charities including Brainwave, Sids, Bali Orphanage, Sumba Foundation and the Witchery (Silver Diary) Ovarian Cancer Campaign.

In 2020, Rama and her family suffered from Dengue fever.
