= Uzbek carpet =

Type of traditional carpet

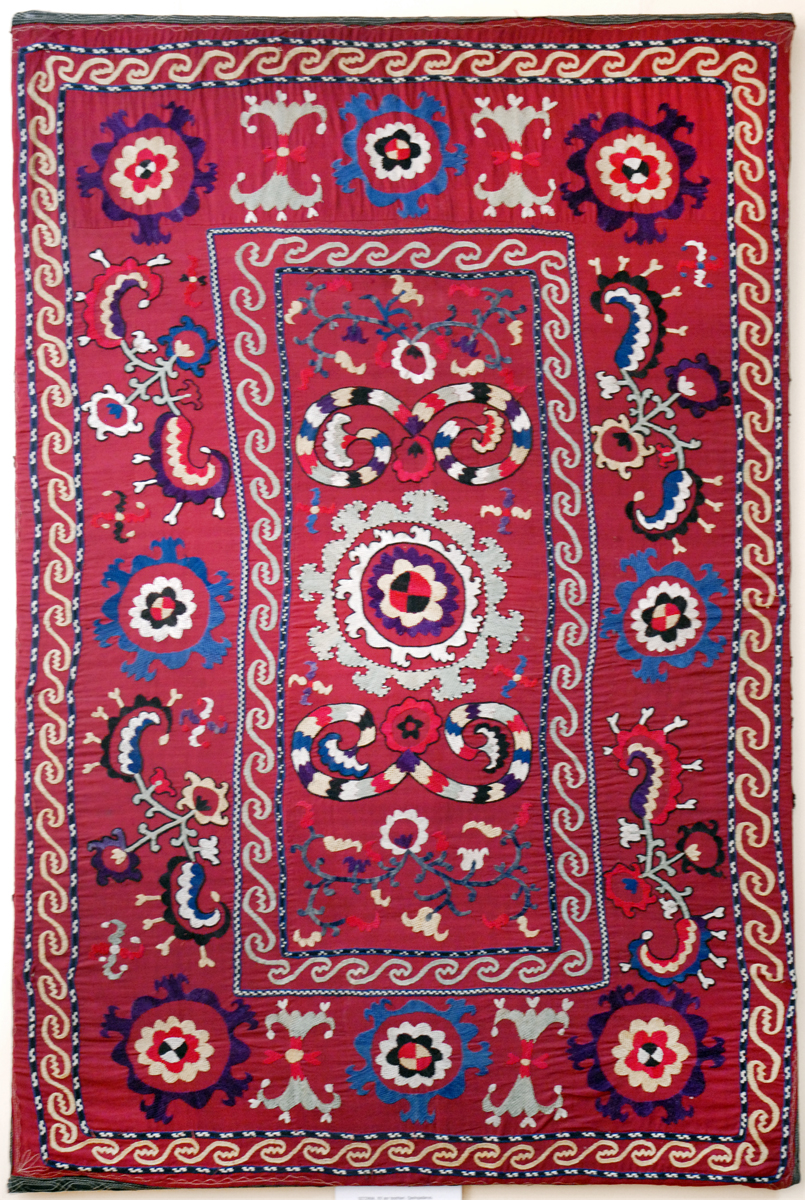
Uzbek carpet

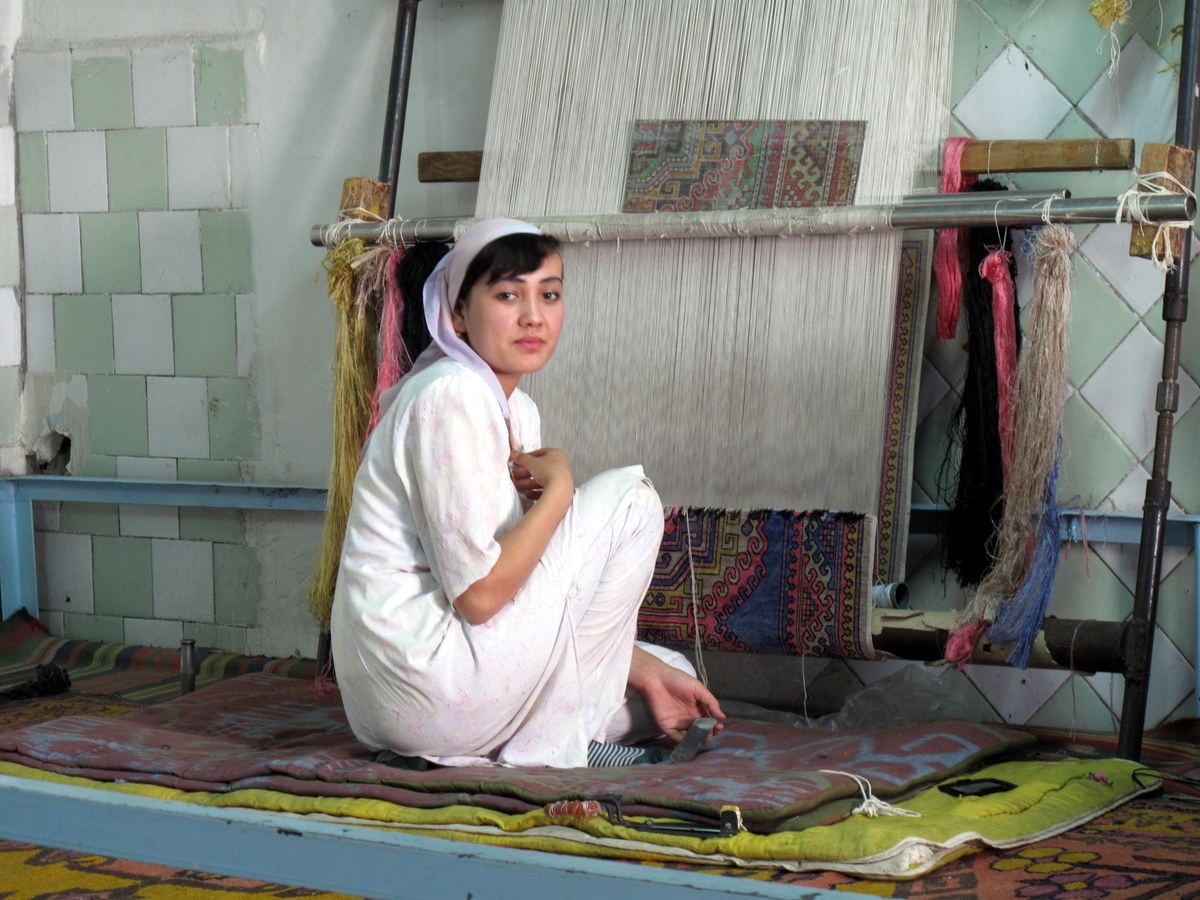
The process of carpet weaving

Uzbek carpet is one of the best-known handmade carpets produced by Uzbeks. Carpet weaving, being one of the types of Uzbek arts and crafts, is inextricably linked with other kinds of Uzbek arts and crafts, continuing the tradition of other types of national fine art. Historically, carpet weaving in Uzbekistan flourished in villages such as Qamashi, Mirichkar, and Dzheynau in the Qashqadaryo Region.

== Manufacture ==
The manufacture of textiles from wool is widespread in the mountainous villages of the Baisun, Sherabad, and Denau regions of Uzbekistan. Carpets were mainly woven from fleece. Carpet weaving was considered a home craft until the middle of the 19th century in Central Asia. Cotton and wool were the main raw materials from the products of agriculture and animal husbandry. White-coloured wool was especially valued. The inhabitants of the mountain villages of Sherabad were considered the best manufacturers of carpets.

== Patterns of carpets ==
Patterns on the carpets were varied and carried definite meanings. For example, a carpet with an olacha (mixed colours) pattern, 'kulf-kalit', meant that the door of the house was always open to friends and closed to enemies. A 'kurokgul' pattern symbolised the wish that two young people would stay together until old age. The Surkhan oasis is known for its plain pile rugs with geometric, zoomorphic, anthropomorphic, and islimi patterns, which represent the religious beliefs and faith of the people. These rugs were woven from cotton thread; first, the weavers wove the lower part, which consisted of a variety of colours and was called 'suv yuli'—the way of the water. There was also a 'kosh uyurma' pattern, which was woven from three or four layers of white and black threads. One of the main parts of the carpet is 'chetki kora'; a train of edges was used for its manufacture.

The making of takir gilam (a weaving technique) is a complex process, and an average of 12–14 kg of yarn was used. A Turkmen clan, the Ersari, living in the Surkhan oasis, are considered the best masters at making takir gilam. From the wool yarn, they produced takinamat in white, black, blue, and other colours.
