= Electric-Techno Neon Gods =

Taiwanese subcultural dance performance

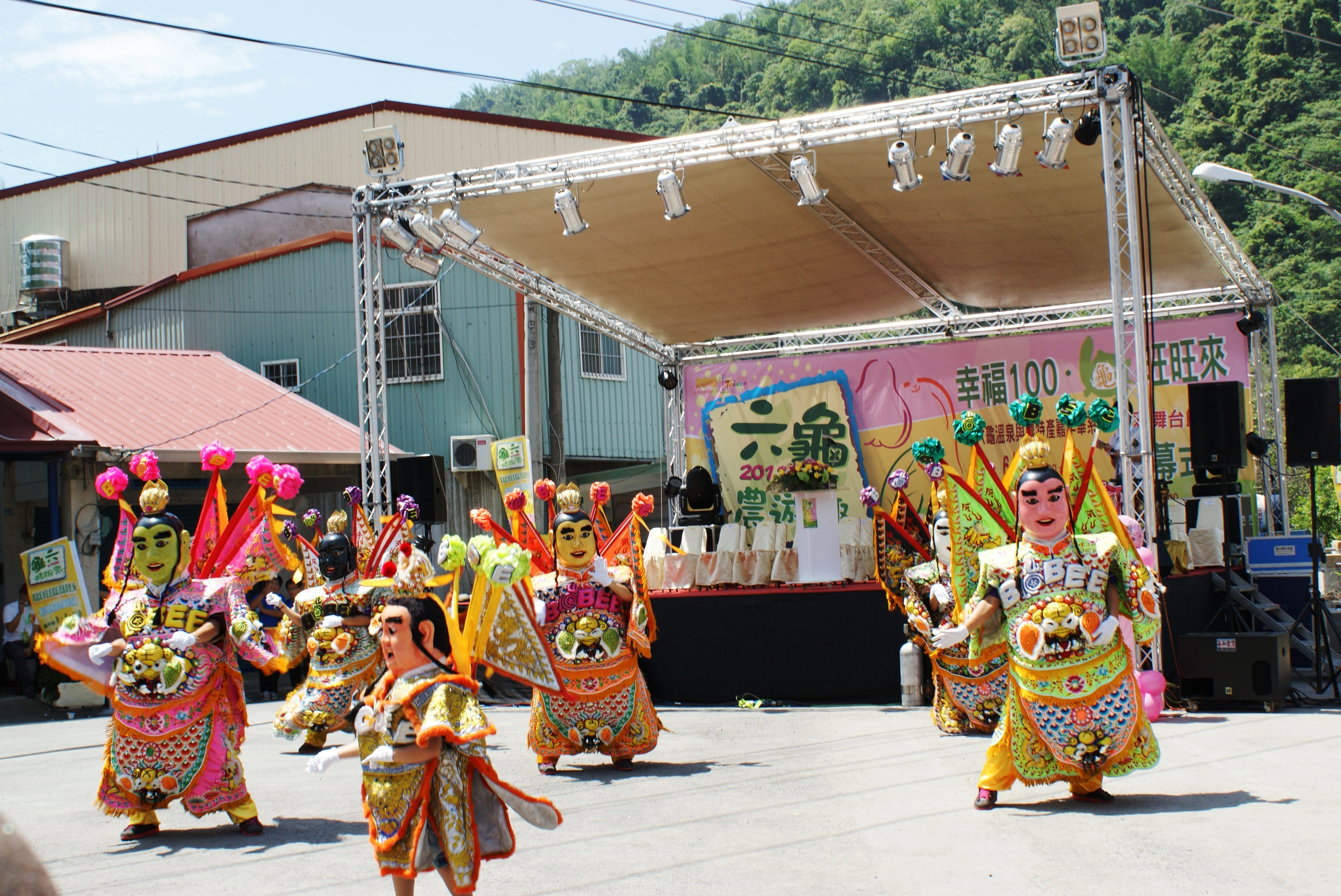
An Electric-Techno Neon Gods performance in Kaohsiung, Taiwan

An Electric-Techno Neon Gods performance during the opening dinner of the 2015 Asian Law Institute Conference held in the Howard Plaza Hotel Taipei, Taiwan

Electric-Techno Neon Gods (Chinese: 電音三太子; pinyin: Diànyīn Sāntàizi; Pe̍h-ōe-jī: Tiān-im Sam-thài-chú), sam thai tsu (Chinese: 三太子; pinyin: Sāntàizi; Pe̍h-ōe-jī: Sam-thài-chú), or Techno Prince Nezha is a subcultural dance performance which combines a traditional Taiwan folk dance performance (Chinese: 陣頭; pinyin: zhèntóu; Pe̍h-ōe-jī: tīn-thâu) with modern pop music.

There are two theories about the origin of the Electric-Techno Neon Gods. One says it is from Beigang Township, Yunlin County, Taiwan; while the other one says it started from Puzi City, Chiayi County, Taiwan. According to reliable sources, some people dressed up as bodyguards of the gods (Chinese: 大仙尪仔; Pe̍h-ōe-jī: tōa-sian ang-á) and performed similar dances during religious parades at local temples. As many of the dancers were young people who enjoyed going clubbing, they began combining the traditional dances with electronic music. Later on, professional dance teams specializing in Electric-Techno Neon Gods dancing were formed. The costumes worn by dancers are based on traditional outfits with trendy elements added to them, such as oversized sunglasses and LED lights. White gloves are commonly worn as in Taiwan it is popular to wear gloves while dancing.

Apart from being performed during religious rituals, Electric-Techno Neon Gods dances now often take place during many secular events in Taiwan. Such dances were performed during the opening ceremonies of the World Games 2009, 2009 Summer Deaflympics, Expo 2010 Shanghai China, the 2010 Taipei International Flora Exposition, and other international activities and exhibitions.
