= Boudha Stupa =

Buddhist stupa in Boudha, Kathmandu, Nepal

- बौद्धनाथ महाचैत्य खास्ती महाचैत्य
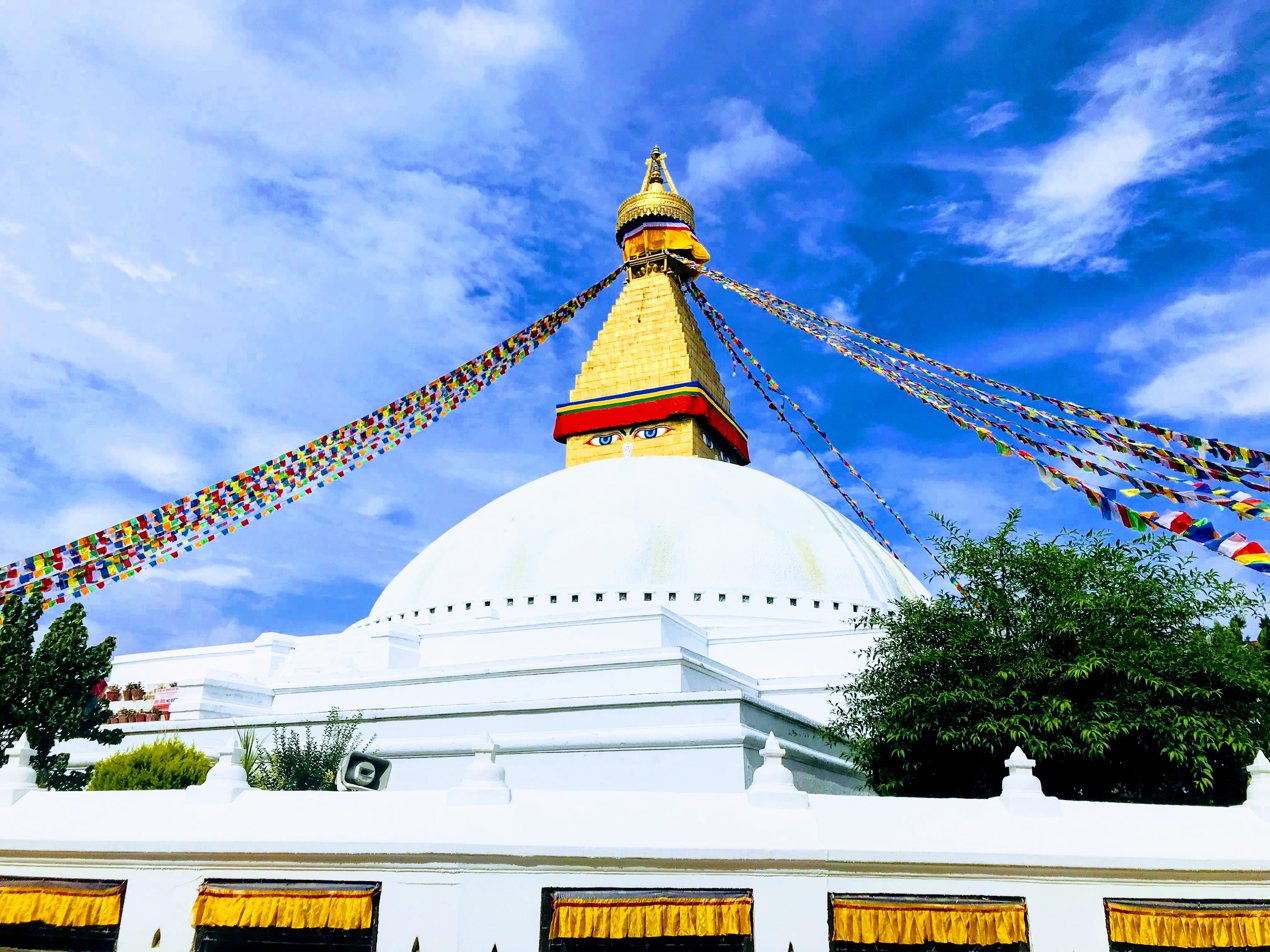
- The Stupa of Boudanath, associated with the relics of Kassapa Buddha and Shakyamuni Buddha, a UNESCO World Heritage Site

- Location within Kathmandu Location within Bagmati Province Location within Nepal

Religion
- Affiliation: Buddhism, Hinduism

Location
- Location: Kathmandu, Nepal
- Coordinates: 27°43′17″N 85°21′43″E

Architecture
- Type: Stupa
- Height (max): 36 metres (118 ft)

UNESCO World Heritage Site
- Part of: Kathmandu Valley
- Criteria: Cultural: iii, iv, vi
- Reference: 121bis
- Inscription: 1979 (3rd Session)

Protected Ancient Monument
- Law: Ancient Monuments Preservation Act, 2013 (1956)
- ID: NP-KMC06-09

Boudha Stupa (Nepali: बौद्ध; Newari: खास्ति चैत्य), Boudhanath Stupa (Standard Tibetan: བྱ་རུང་ཁ་ཤོར།, Wylie: bya rung ka shor), also known as Khasti Chaitya or Khāsa Chaitya, is a stupa and major spiritual landmark seen as the embodiment of the enlightened mind of all the Buddhas. Located in the northeast of Kathmandu Valley within the city of Kathmandu, Nepal and originally surrounded by rice paddies, the stupa is said in one text to have given birth to Tibetan Buddhism. It is believed to contain consecrated substances, and its layout as a massive mandala makes it the largest spherical stupa in Nepal and one of the largest in the world.

The present structure was most likely built in the 14th century, although Newar chronicles mention the construction of a stupa here as early as the 5th century. In 1979 the Boudha Stupa was designated as a UNESCO World Heritage Site.

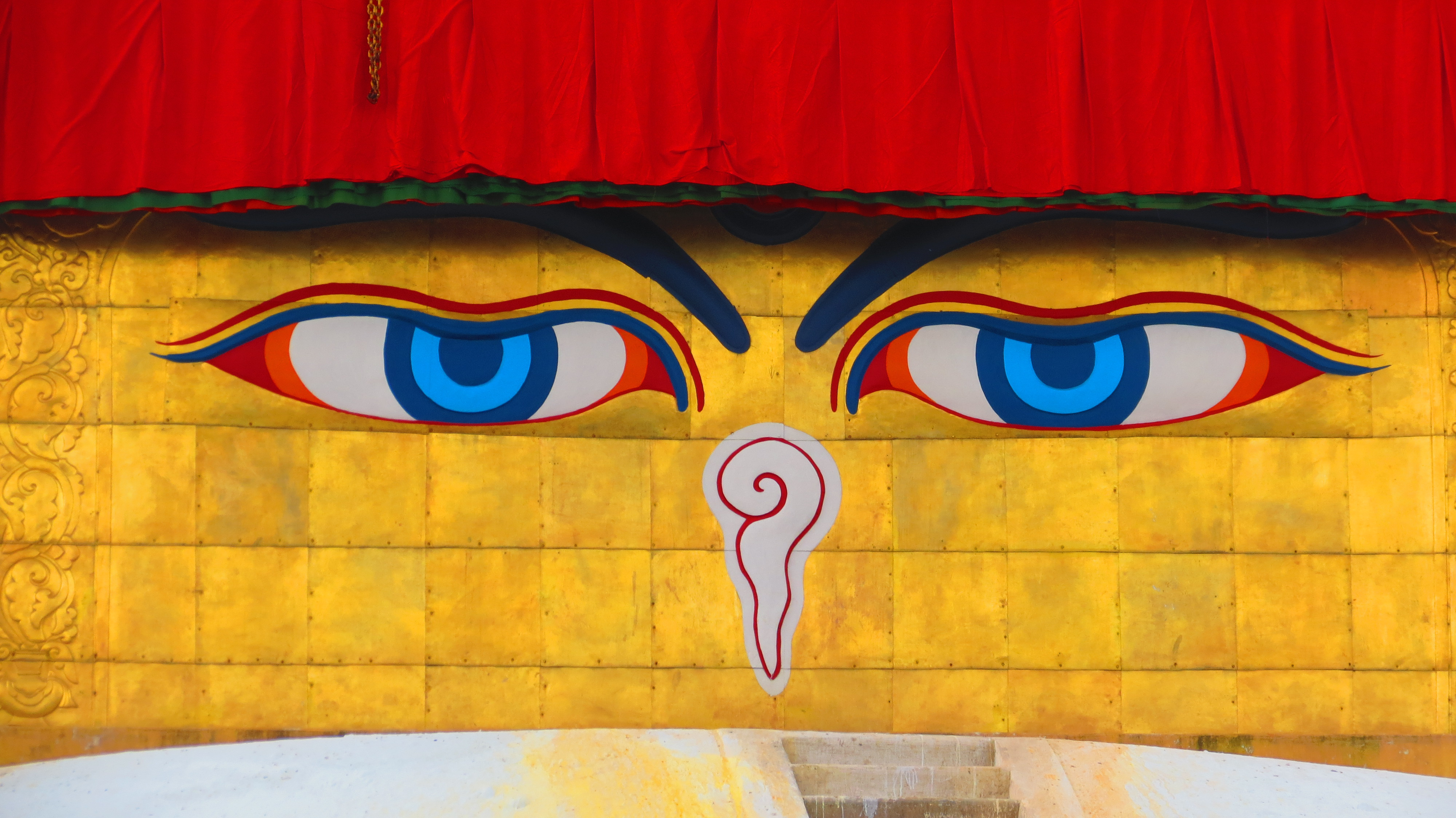
The eyes of Boudanath

The stupa's consecrated body relics include bone pieces held to be those of Kassapa Buddha and of Shakyamuni Buddha, together with dharmakaya relics, dharma relics, cloth relics, and body, speech, mind, mind qualities, and activity representations among its other relics. It is located on the ancient trade route from Tibet to India which enters the Kathmandu Valley by the village of Sankhu in the northeast corner and continues to the ancient and smaller stupa of Chabahil named Charumati Stupa, often called "Little Boudhanath". The route then turns directly south, heading over the Bagmati River to Lalitpur and the ancient Malla Kingdom in Patan. Tibetan merchants have rested and offered prayers at Boudha Stupa for many centuries.

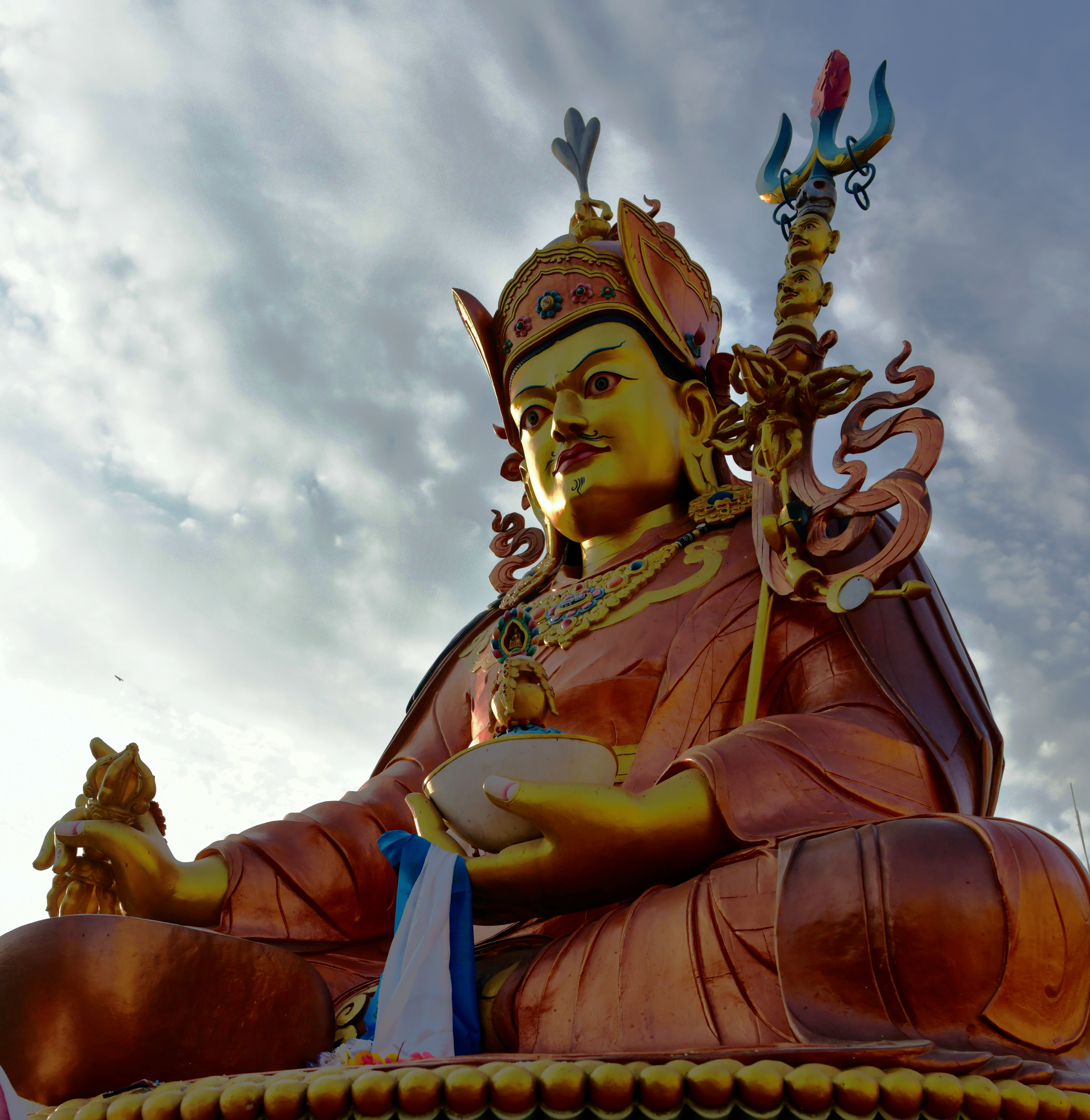
Statue of Padmasambhava (founder of Tibetan Buddhism) at Ghyoilisang peace park, Boudhanath

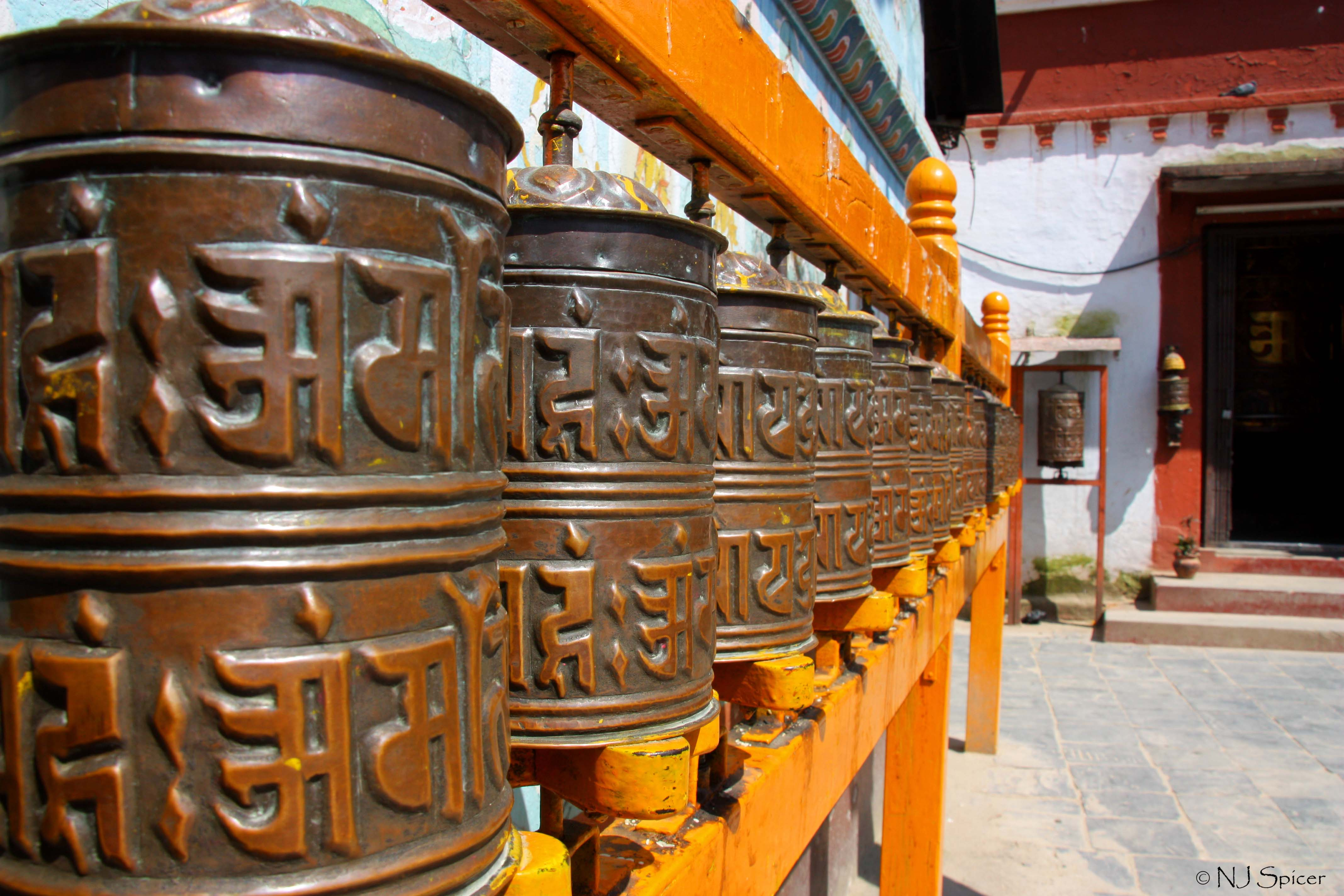
Prayer wheels with the mantra of Buddha Avalokiteshvara: Om mani padme hum

Following the 1959 Tibetan uprising, a large number of the Tibetan refugees migrated to Nepal and settled around the stupa in Boudha. The Tibetan diaspora has given rise to the construction of over 50 gompas and Buddhist monasteries, restaurants, guesthouses, and artisanal businesses around Boudha. Along with Swayambhunath and Namo Buddha, it is one of the most visited pilgrimage sites for devout Buddhists, and also attracts tourists to the Kathmandu area.

Built at the main northern entrance to the Boudha Stupa is a shrine to the Dharma protectress Mammo Pukkasi, known as the fierce Hariti or Ajima to local Newari Buddhists. Her shrine and the Ganachakra offerings there are the responsibility of the Mahaguru Gompa, which faces the stupa's northern entrance.

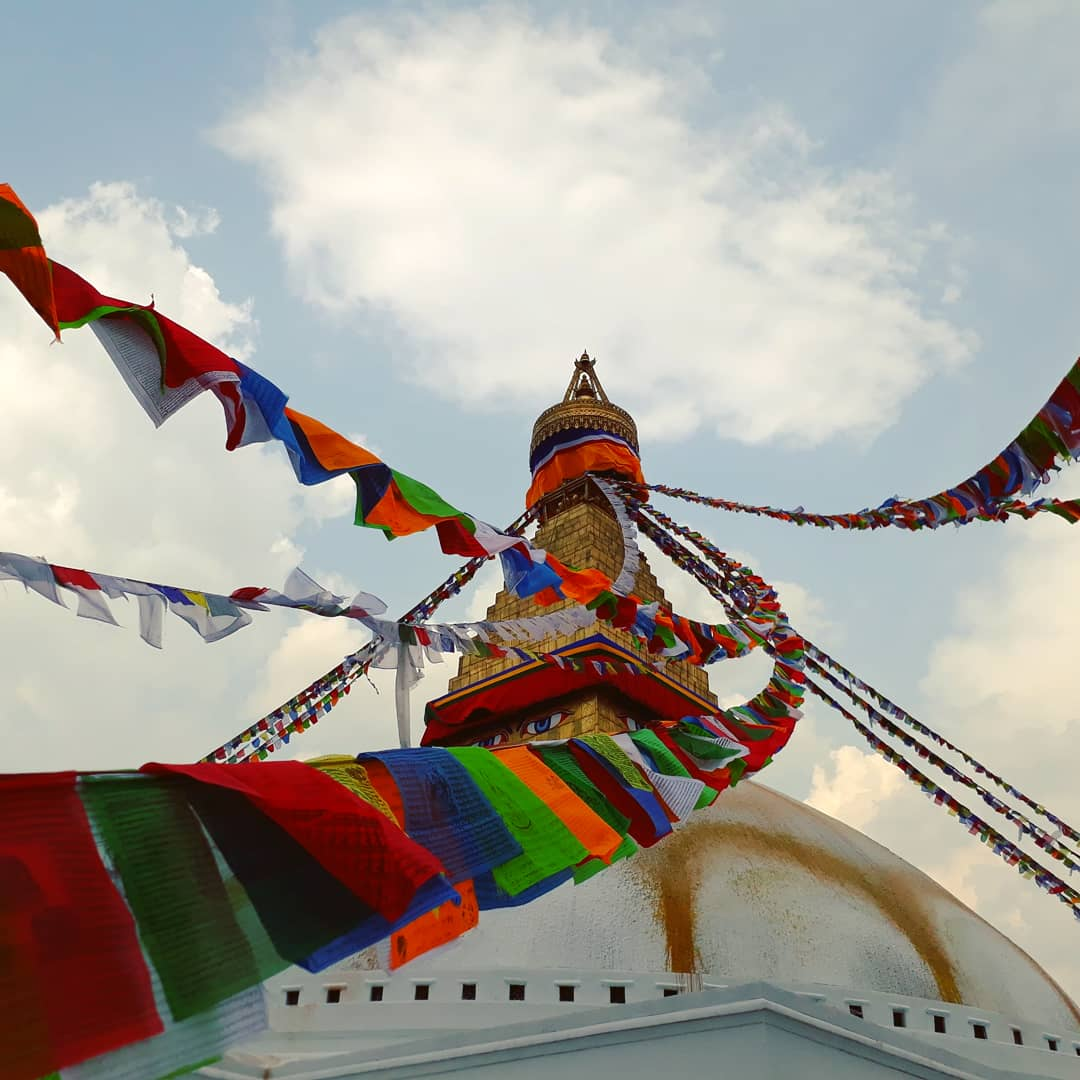
Prayer flags around main stupa

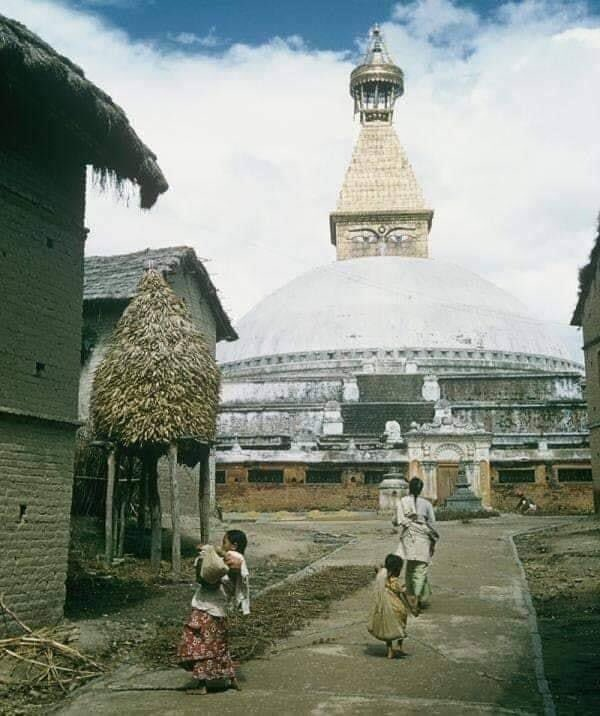
Boudha Stupa's northern entrance in 1950, by William Morris

== History ==
=== Licchavi records ===
The early written source Gopālarājavaṃśāvalī says the town of Boudha was founded by the Nepali Licchavi king Śivadeva (c. 590–604 CE), though other Nepali chronicles date it to the reign of King Mānadeva (464–505 CE).

The earliest historical references to the Khaasti Chaitya are found in the chronicles of the Newars. First, Khaasti is mentioned as one of the four stupas found by the Licchavi king Vrisadeva (c. 400 CE) or Vikramjit. Second, the Newars' legend of the stupa's origin attributes it to King Dharmadeva's son Manadeva as atonement for his unwitting patricide. Manadeva was a great Licchavi king, military conqueror and a patron of the arts who reigned c. 464–505. Manadeva is also linked with the Swayambhu Chaitya of Gum Bahal. Third, another great Licchhavi king Shivadeva (AD 590–604) is associated with Boudha by an inscription; he may have restored the chaitya.

Nepali tradition holds that the palace of King Vikramjit, the Licchavi king, once stood where the Narayanhiti Palace currently stands. King Vikramjit instructed that a hiti should be built in the southern part of the palace courtyard, but there was no sign of water from the hiti, so the king consulted astrologers. The astrologers suggested that a sacrifice with a male candidate having 'swee-nita lachhyan' (स्वीनिता लछ्यन), or thirty-two perfections, should be performed. Only the king himself and his two princes were suitable candidates. So the king decided to sacrifice himself so that signs of water could be seen at the hiti. The king told his son that a man will be sleeping by covering his face and body, and to sacrifice him without looking at his face. After the son did so, he realised he had killed his own father. With regret and guilt, he consulted with the priests for a way to salvation. The priests suggested to him to fly a 'bwo-khaa' (ब्वःखा), a flying hen, from the top of Mhaasu Khwaa Maju (म्हासु ख्वा: माजु). The hen landed in the place where the chaitya is currently standing.

A female dharma protector, Ajimaa, was already located at that place before the chaitya construction started. The Khaasti Ajima (खास्ति अजिमा) is one of the important Ajima of Kathmandu. The Newar tradition considers Ajima to be a superpower, believing that these female energies protect the nation. The tradition of Kumari relates to a place called 'Kumari-gaal', which is south of Khaasti.

During the time of its construction, the place was struck with a drought and the people managed to abate the scarcity of water by collecting the droplets of dew. Dew is called 'Khasu' (खसु) and droplets are called 'Ti' (ति). Historians suggest that the traditional knowledge of how to harvest dew droplets has been lost with time. Other places that end with 'Ti' (ति) have similar history, such as Chalati (चलति), Kusunti (कुसिन्ति), and so on.

=== Tibetan records ===
The birth of Tibetan Buddhism is intrinsically connected to the Boudha Stupa. In a dharma teaching given by Padmasambhava to Yeshe Tsogyal, King Trisong Detsen (r. 755 to 797) and the Twenty-five Heart Students at Samye Monastery, the history of the stupa and its relationship to Tibetan Buddhism is explained, as a section within a complete teaching.

This teaching tells that Little Purna, a daughter of Indra living in the gods' realm, broke a law of the realm by stealing a divine flower. She was cast into the human realm, where she was reborn into a family of Kathmandu Valley poultry farmers and named Samvari.

Samvari also became a poultry farmer and had four sons by different fathers, whom she raised to be prosperous householders. She amassed wealth and made an intention: "I will put this wealth to good use. I will build a support for the wisdom-mind of all the buddhas, my own yidam, a place for beings to accumulate immeasurable merit, a great stūpa whose essence is the Tathāgatas’ relics."

Samvari then asked the local king for his permission and for the necessary grant of land. The king thought and was impressed by Samvari, then responded, "Jarung!" ("Let it be done!"). She immediately began building the stupa with bricks loaded by her four sons and a servant, carried by an elephant and a donkey.

Local Newar people became concerned about the size of the stupa, and how it would reflect on members of the king's court who were not building bigger supports for the dharma and roots of merit. The king refused to change his decision, and explained how "Let it be done" (Jarung) "slipped from his tongue" (Kashor). Thus, the stupa became known as the Jarung Kashor.

Her four sons continued with the stupa's construction after her death, when she passed into buddhahood while in the bardos. The stupa was consecrated then with Buddha Kassapa's relics, and they made the joint aspiration to bring the Buddha dharma to the frozen borderland of ice, Tibet. The first born son made the aspiration to return as a king, and was reborn in the 8th century as Trisong Detsen. The second born made the aspiration to be the abbott and was reborn as Shantarakshita. The third born son made the aspiration to be born from a lotus and as a powerful mantra master so as to protect the Buddha's teachings, and was reborn as Padmasambhava. The fourth born son made the aspiration to be born as a royal minister so as to help his brothers, and was reborn as the king's minister Bami Trizher of Yarlung. The servant, the elephant, the donkey, and a passing raven were also reborn as humans in Tibet: respectively, as a minister, as U Dum Tsen, as another minister, and as the king's son.

Yeshe Tsogyal recorded Padmasambhava's complete teaching and concealed it as a terma. It was discovered, translated then reconcealed. The translation was rediscovered by Shakya Zangpo along with the complete teaching by Padmasambhava.

After rediscovering the translation of the terma, Shakya Zangpo came to Nepal in search of the stupa but found only an abandoned mound. He undertook a restoration during which he is said to have found the remains of Nepali king Amsuverma, the possible father of Songsten Gampo's Nepali queen Bhrikuti. His restoration is likely to have resulted in the stupa being the size we see today. He is believed to have resided at Chabahil during the work, a few kilometers away. Chabahil is known as Sa lhag rdo Lhag, leftover earth, leftover stones, which refers to the belief that the smaller Chabahil stupa was built using the leftover materials from the Boudha Stupa restoration, which could date the Chabahil stupa to the 15th century.

The story of Samvari the poultry woman is also acknowledged by the local Newar people. A painting of Samvari is on the rear of the Pukkasi or Mammo Hariti shrine at Boudha Stupa, where a pond with ducks is depicted with a woman taking care of them.

== 2015 earthquake ==
The 25 April 2015 Nepal earthquake badly damaged Boudhanath's Stupa, severely cracking the spire. As a result, the whole structure above the dome and the sacred relics it contained had to be examined and either saved or replaced.

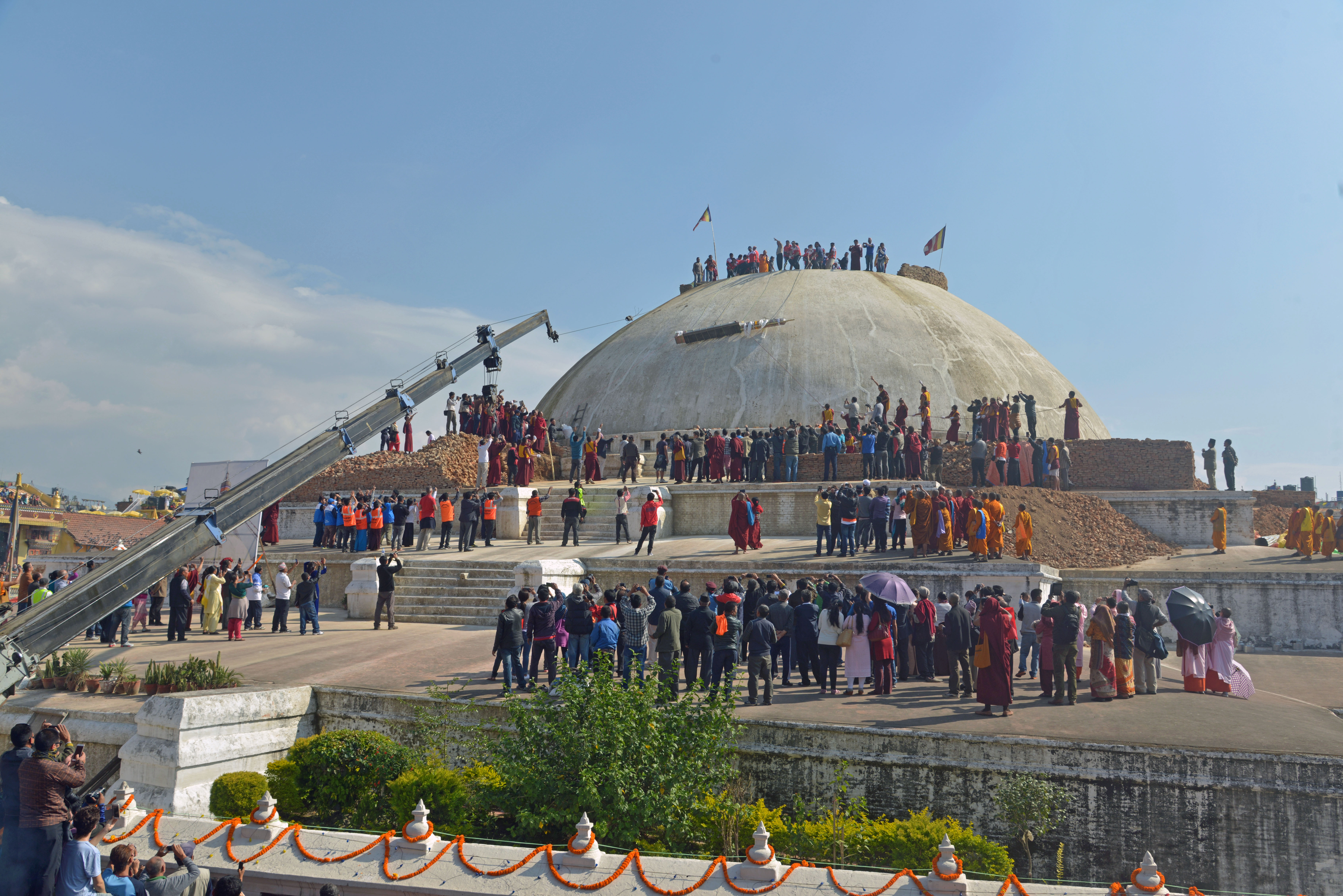
Renovation of Boudhanath stupa after it was damaged by the 2015 Nepal earthquake

Tulku Rigdzin Pema and Sengdrak Tulku Ngawang Tengyal were responsible for the reconsecration of the Great Jarung Kashor Stupa, that began on the Lha Bab Duchen of 22 November 2015 with the ritual insertion of a fresh life-tree, or central pole. The consecrated relics including copper and gold were placed on top of the life-tree, on its sides, in the five places, in its three centers, and then the life-tree was surrounded with plastic and copper to prevent future water damage before being inserted. All of the consecration relics were in place on 17 October 2016, while 21 days of specific consecration rituals were performed by high representatives of the Kagyu tradition, the Sakya tradition, the Gelug tradition, and the Ngagyur Nyingma tradition.

The stupa was reopened on 22 November 2016. The renovation and reconstruction was organized by the Boudhanath Area Development Committee (BADC). The repairs were funded entirely by private donations from Buddhist groups and volunteers. According to the BADC, it cost $2.1 million dollars and more than 30 kg of gold. The repaired building was officially inaugurated by Prime Minister Pushpa Kamal Dahal. The Boudha Stupa was the first of all the earthquake-damaged World Heritage Sites in Kathmandu valley to be rebuilt. The Nepalese government was criticised for its slow pace in reconstructing quake-damaged heritage structures such as temples, with many left unrepaired.

== Boudhanath village ==
The Newars are cited in Padmasambhava's spoken history as being local residents when the stupa was originally built.

In the 19th century, a Chinese yogi settled nearby and was asked to assisted the Nepal ruler with translations during the Gorka war negotiations. In return, he was granted land for a monastery and residence in front of the stupa, and he became known as the first Chiniya Lama.His descendants still have a role regarding the stupa though its management is now the responsibility of Shree Boudha Nath Area Development Committee, which was established as part of the UNESCO requirements for the protection of the World Heritage Site Monument Zone.

== Panorama ==
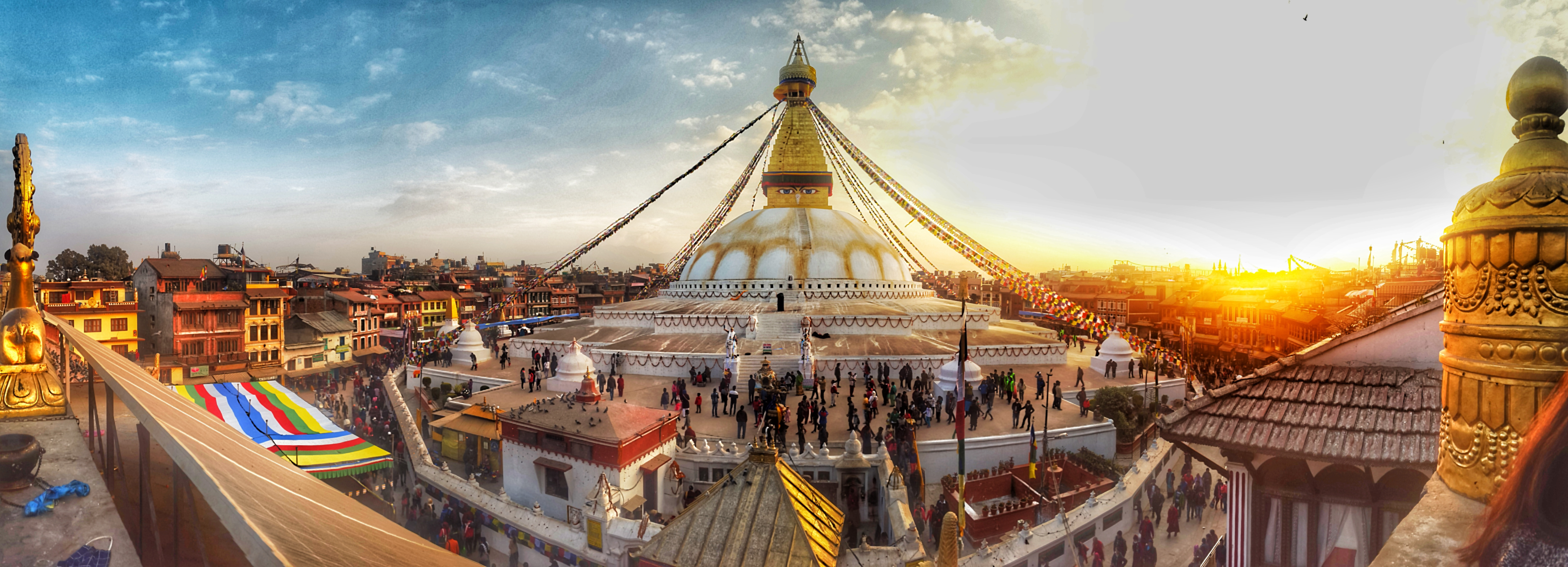
Panorama of the Boudhanath stupa

== Gallery ==
Boudha Stupa or Boudhanath Stupa in Nepal.UNESCO World Heritage Site

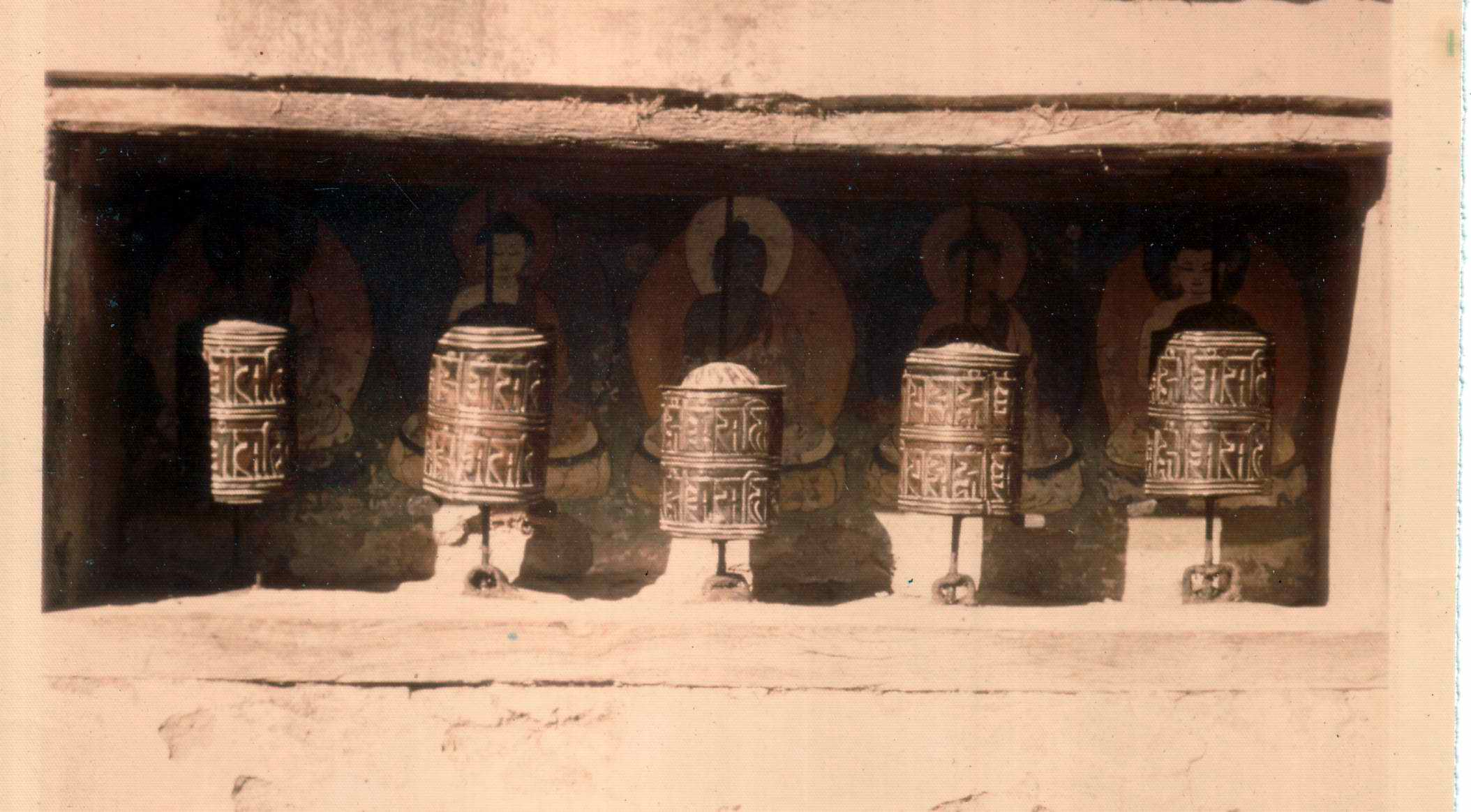
Prayer wheels of Boudnath, 1974

Flower offerings in bowls at Boudha Stupa in Boudhanath, Kathmandu, Nepal

Aerial view of Boudha

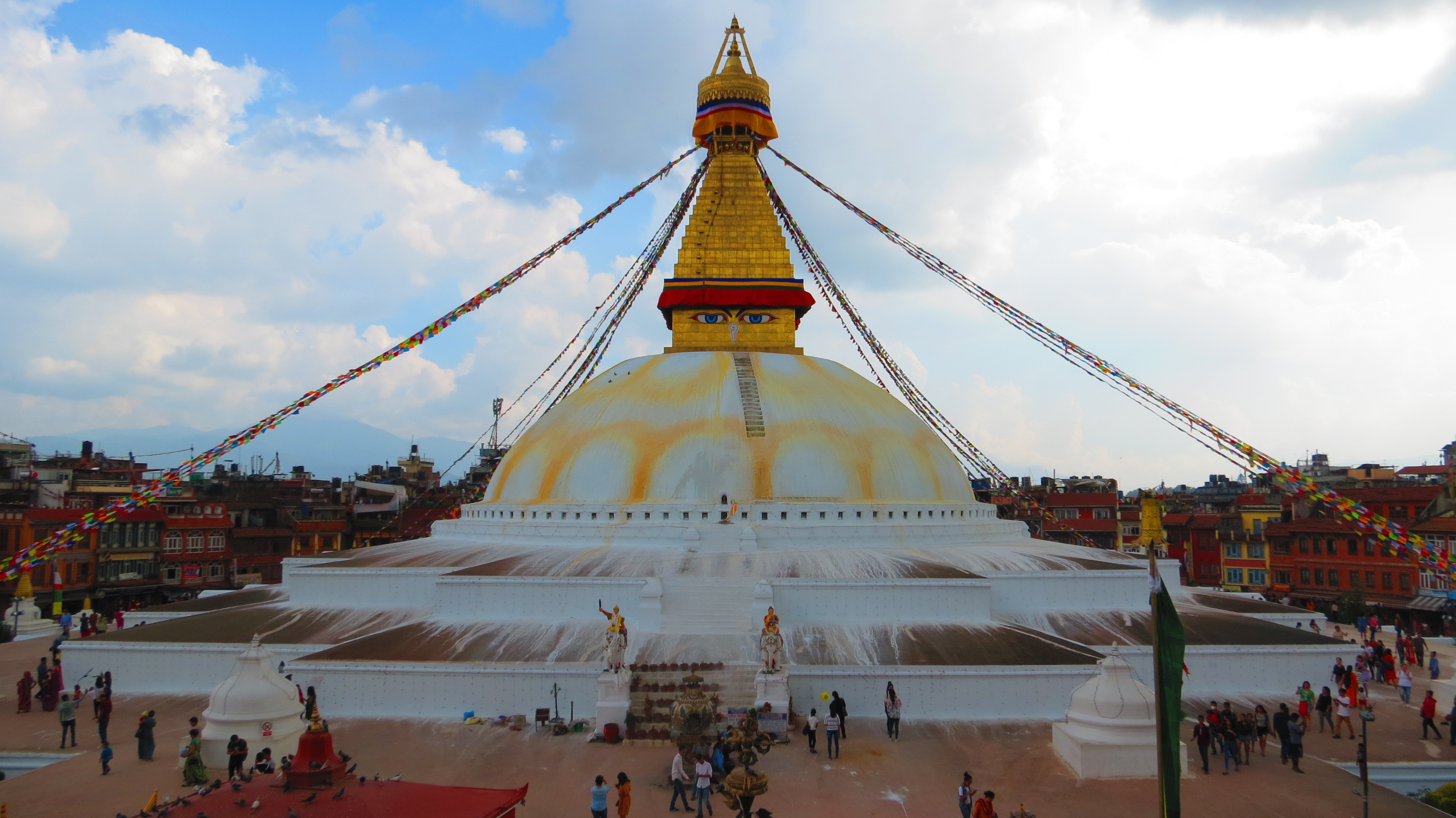
Wide view of Boudha Stupa

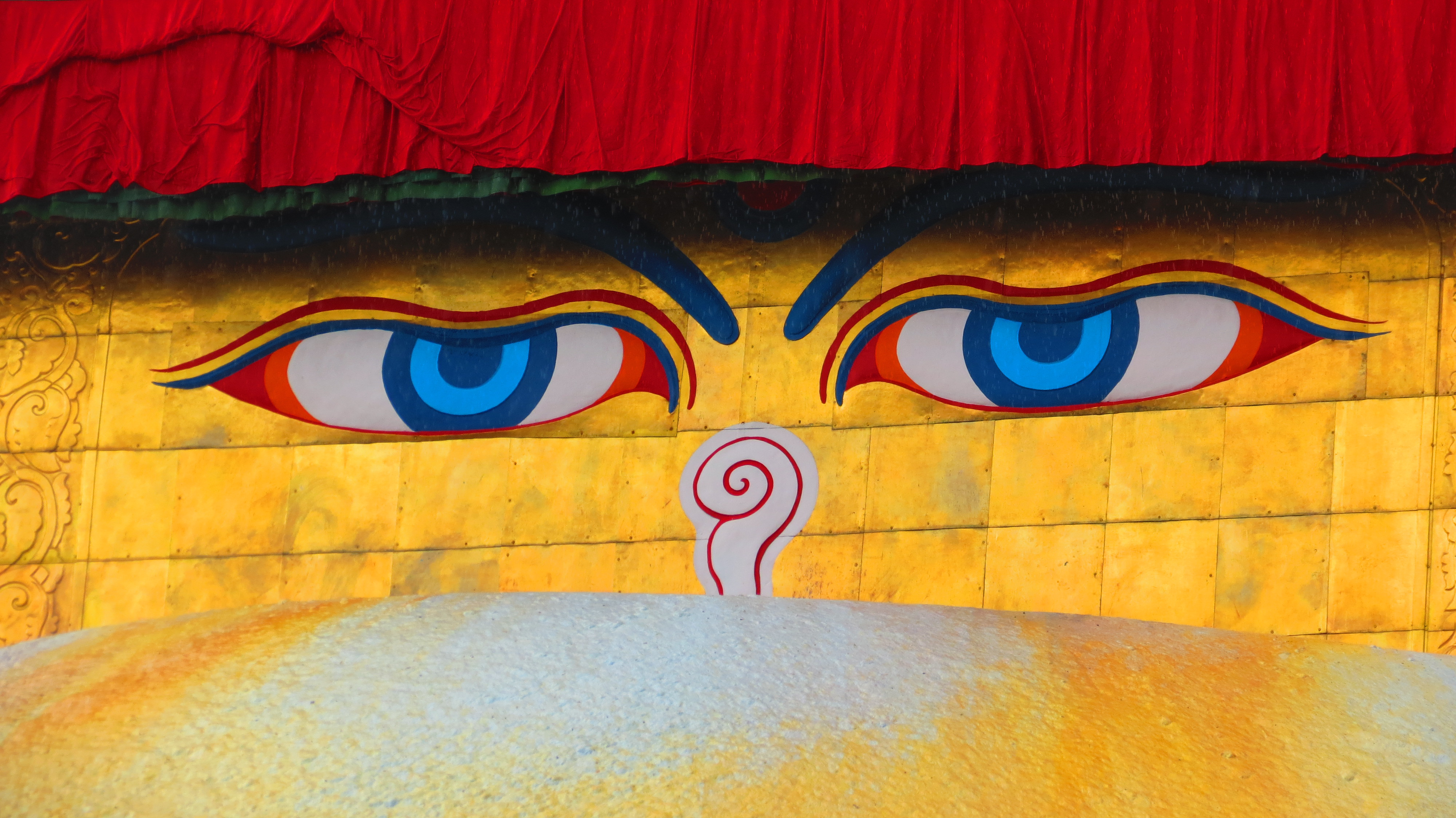
Eyes of Boudhanath

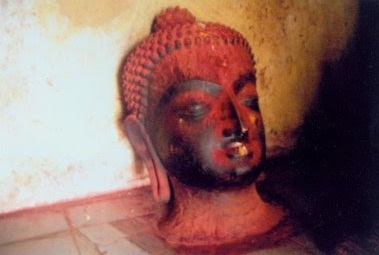
head of Dipankara Adi Buddha

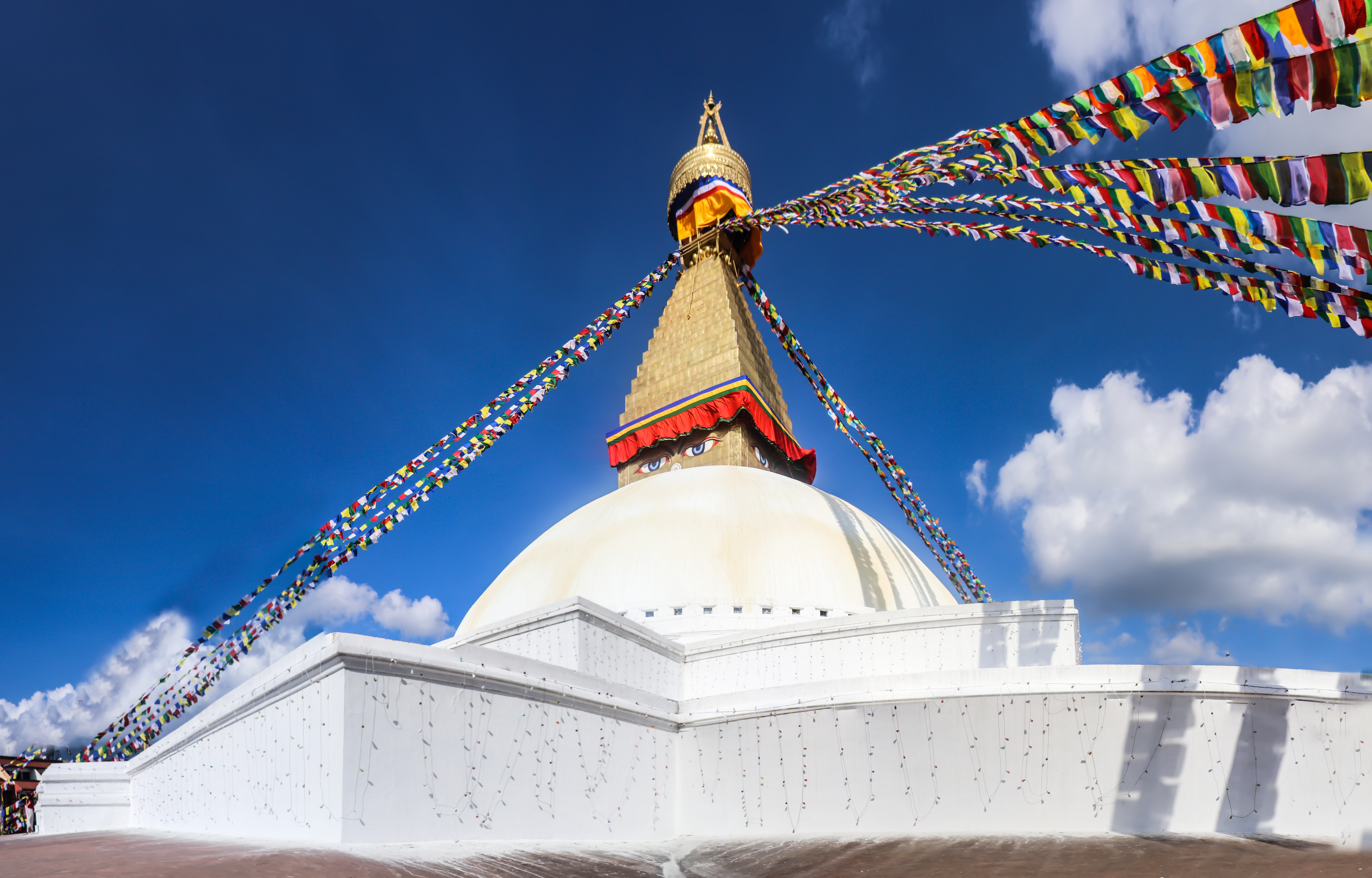
A view of Boudha Stupa Premises

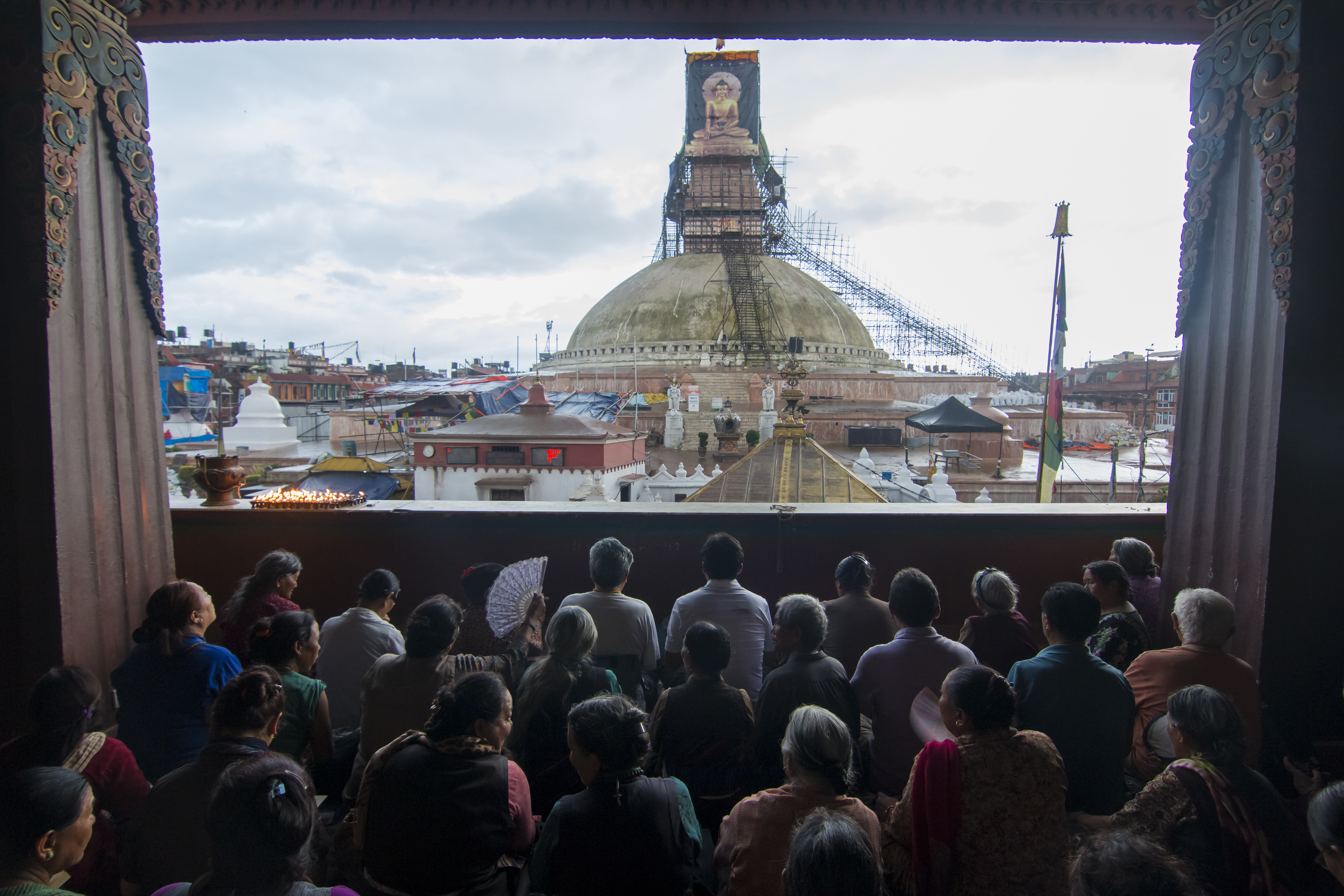
Buddhists praying on the occasion of Buddha Jayanti (during a renovation of a Boudhanath temple)

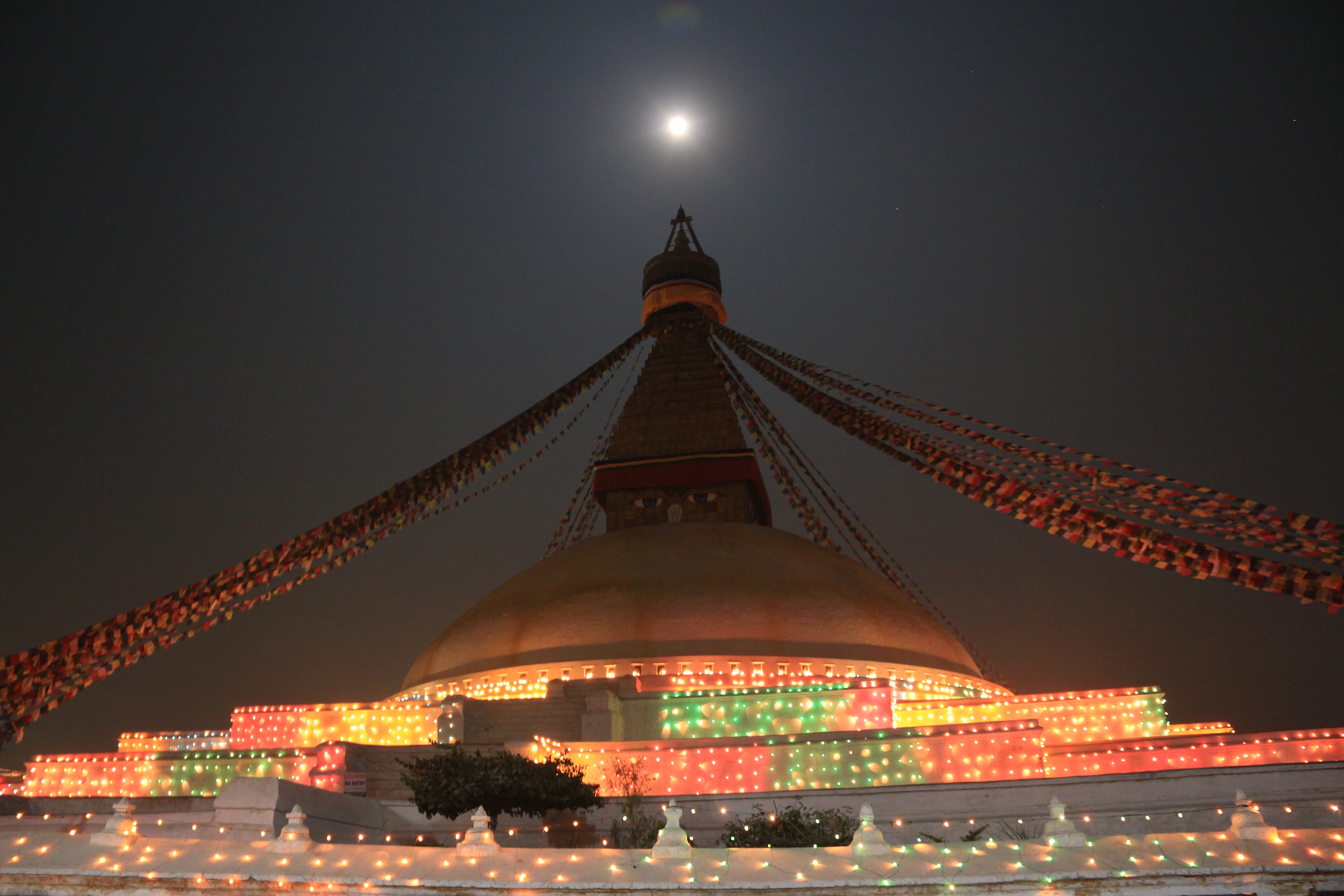
Boudhanath in the full moon night of Buddha Jayanti

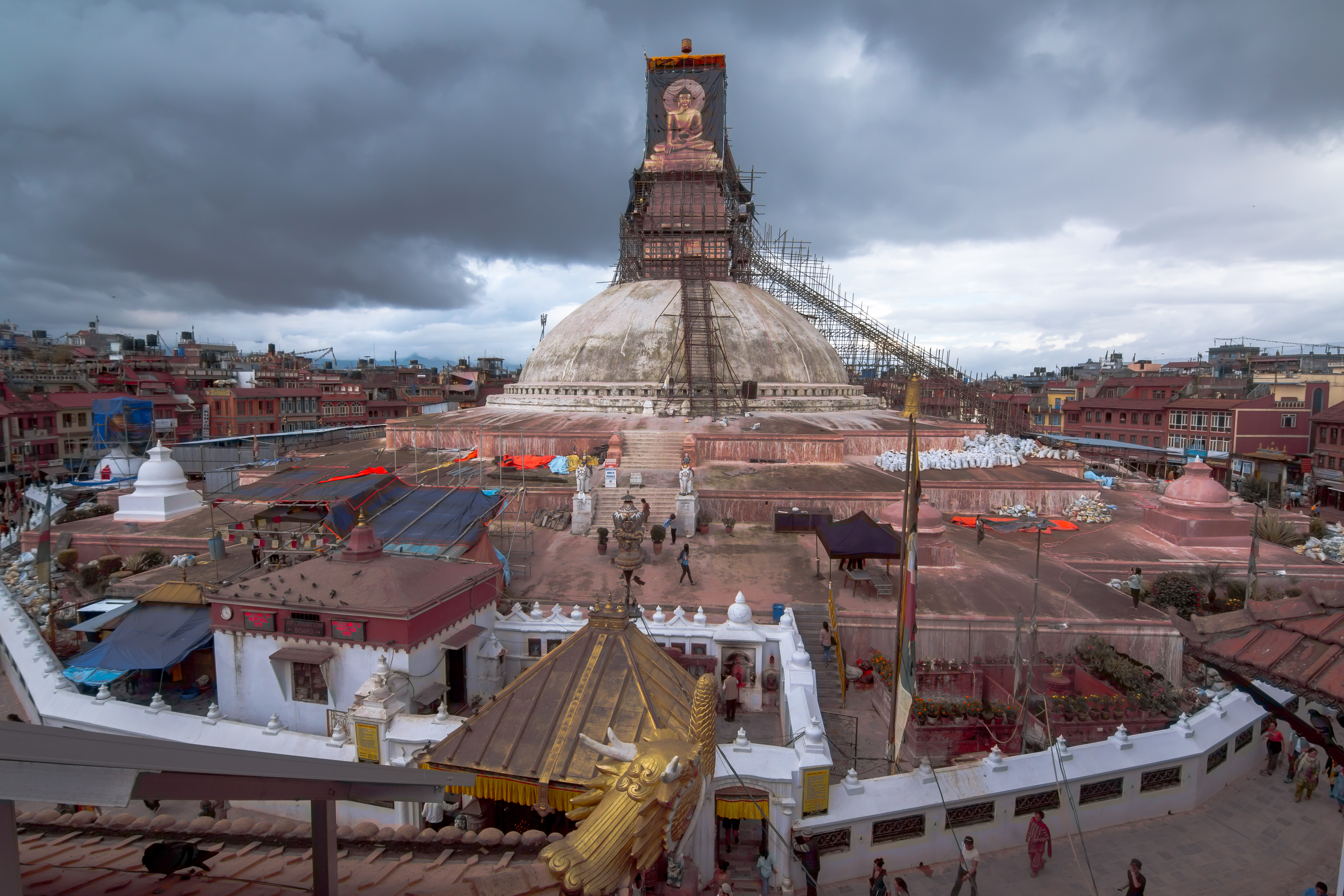
One of Nepal's World Heritage Sites, the Boudha Stupa

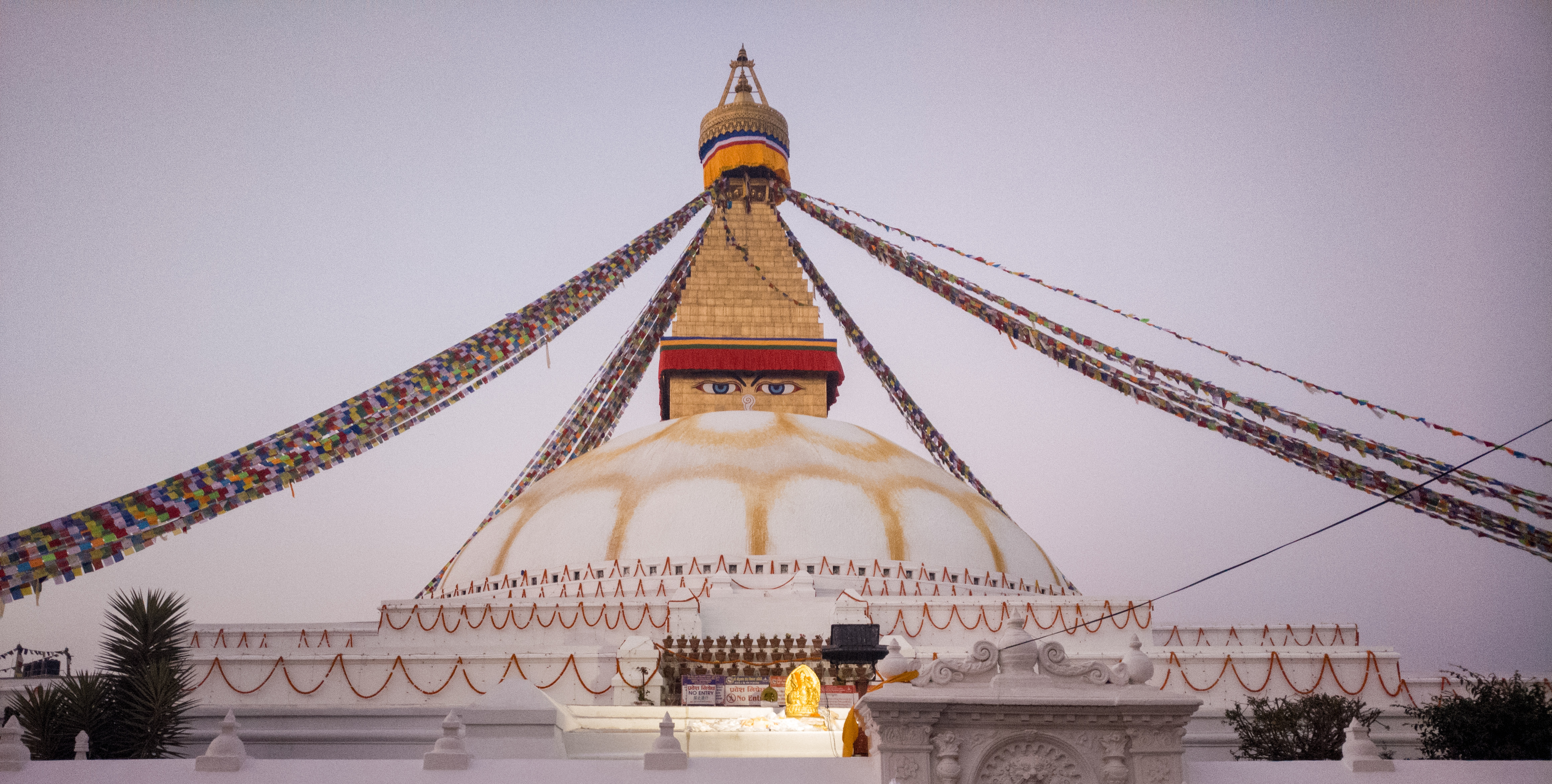
Boudha Stupa after renovation.

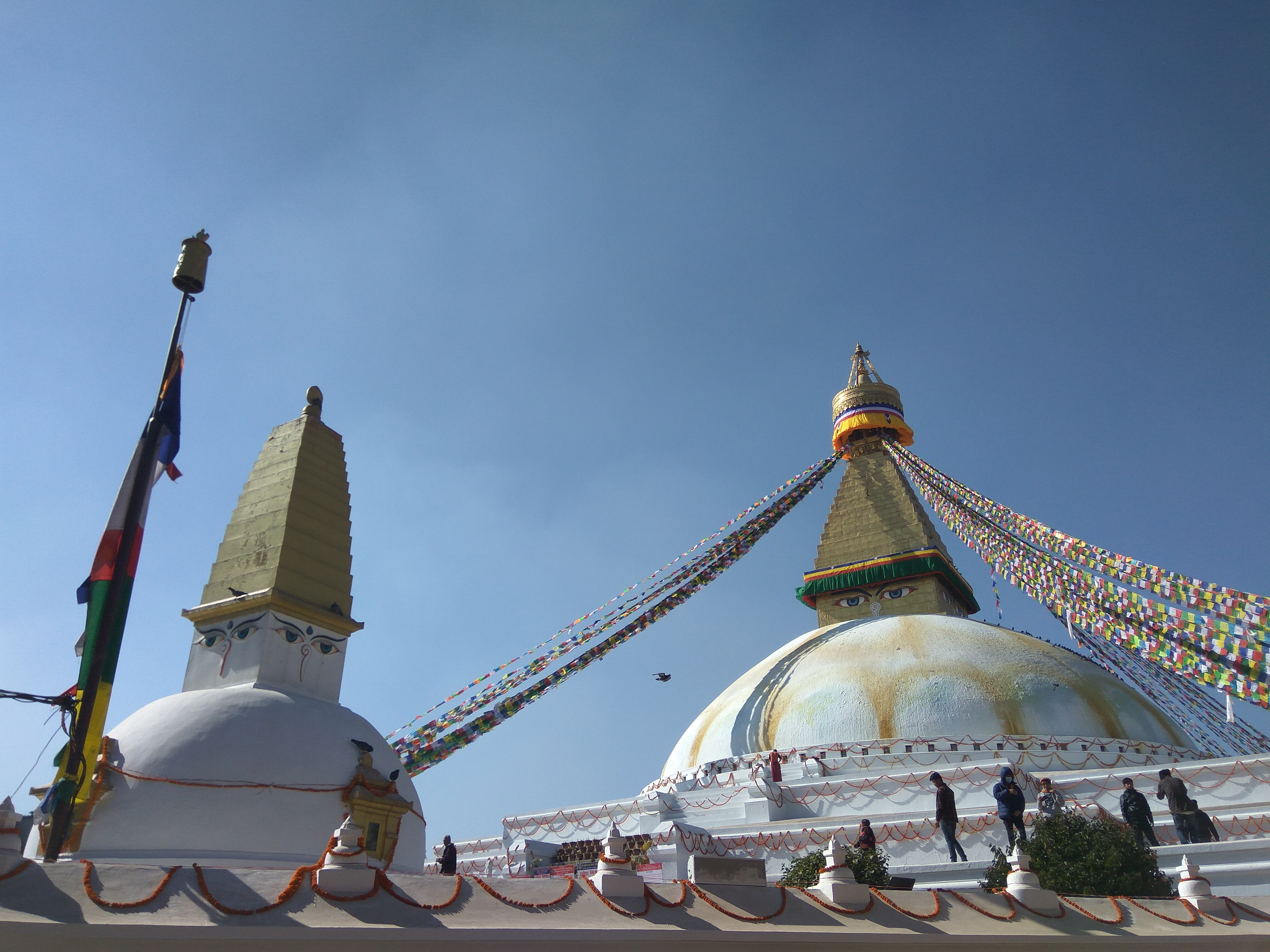
Boudhanath

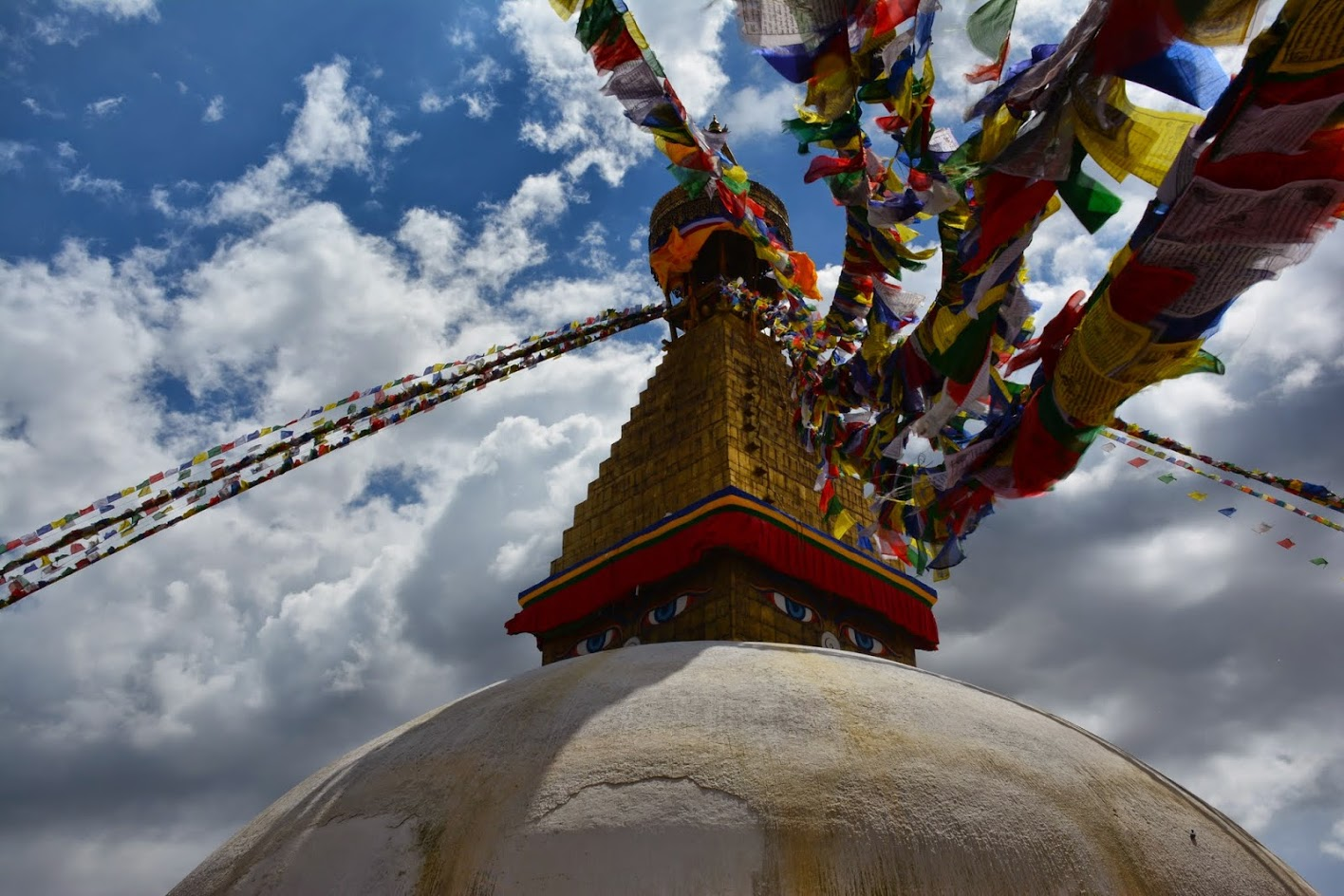
Flags Above Boudha Stupa

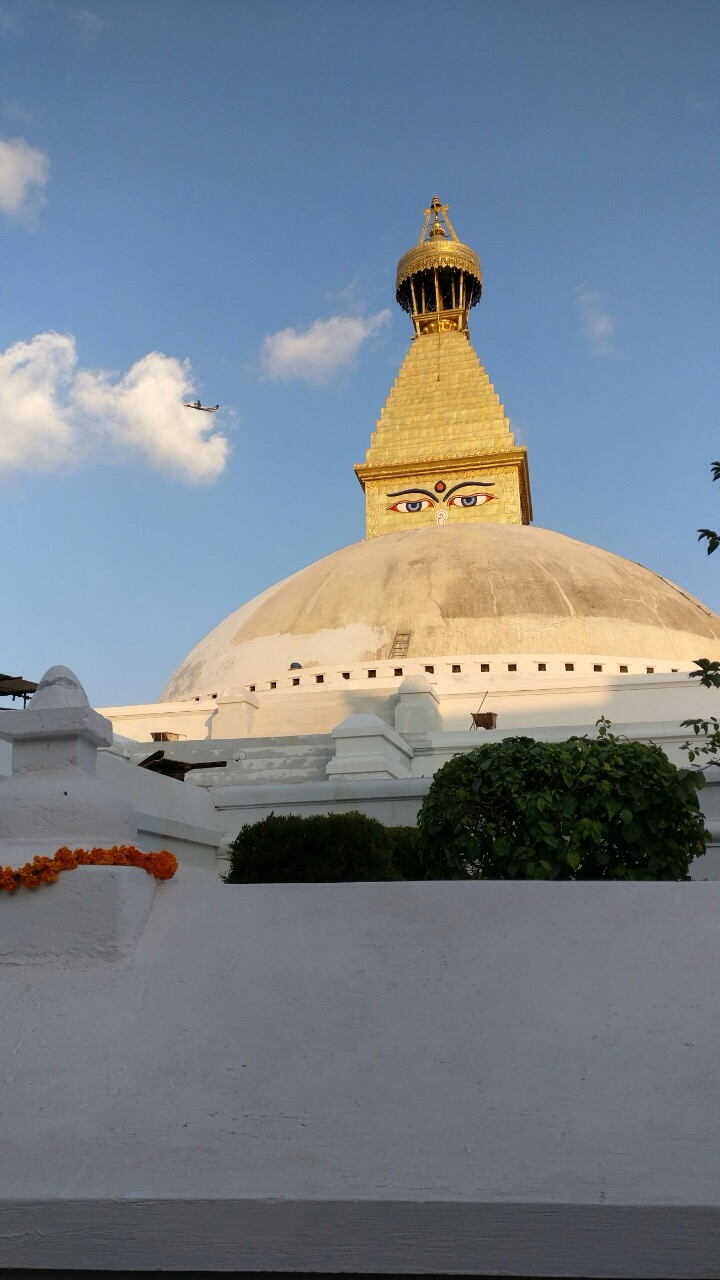
Renovation of Boudha Stupa

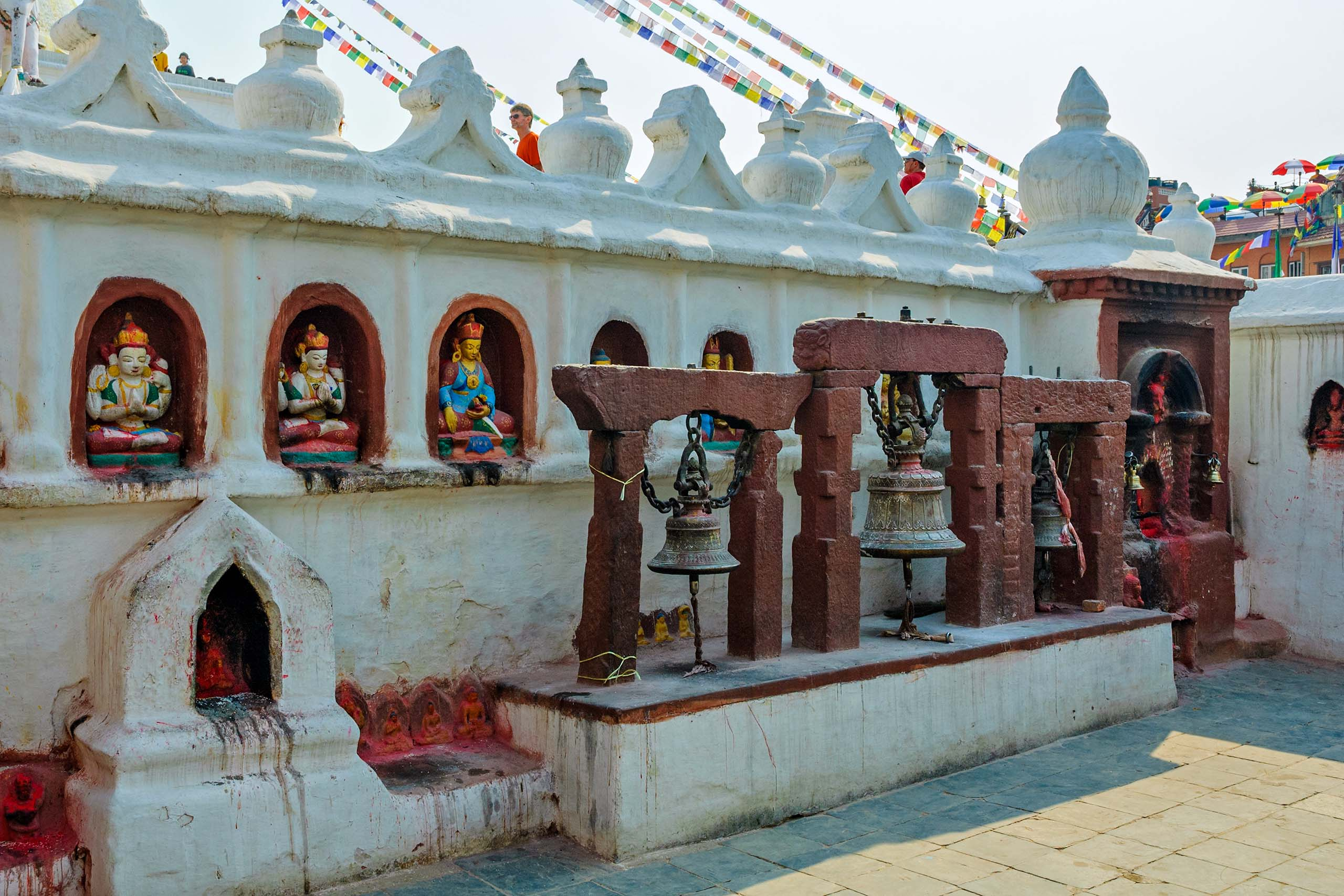
Boudhanath stupa bells and Buddha statues in niches

== See also ==
- Kora (pilgrimage)
- Swayambhunath
- List of Stupas in Nepal
