= Charumati Stupa =

Buddhist Stupa in Kathmandu, Nepal

Coordinates: 27.7160251340°N 85.34581566°E

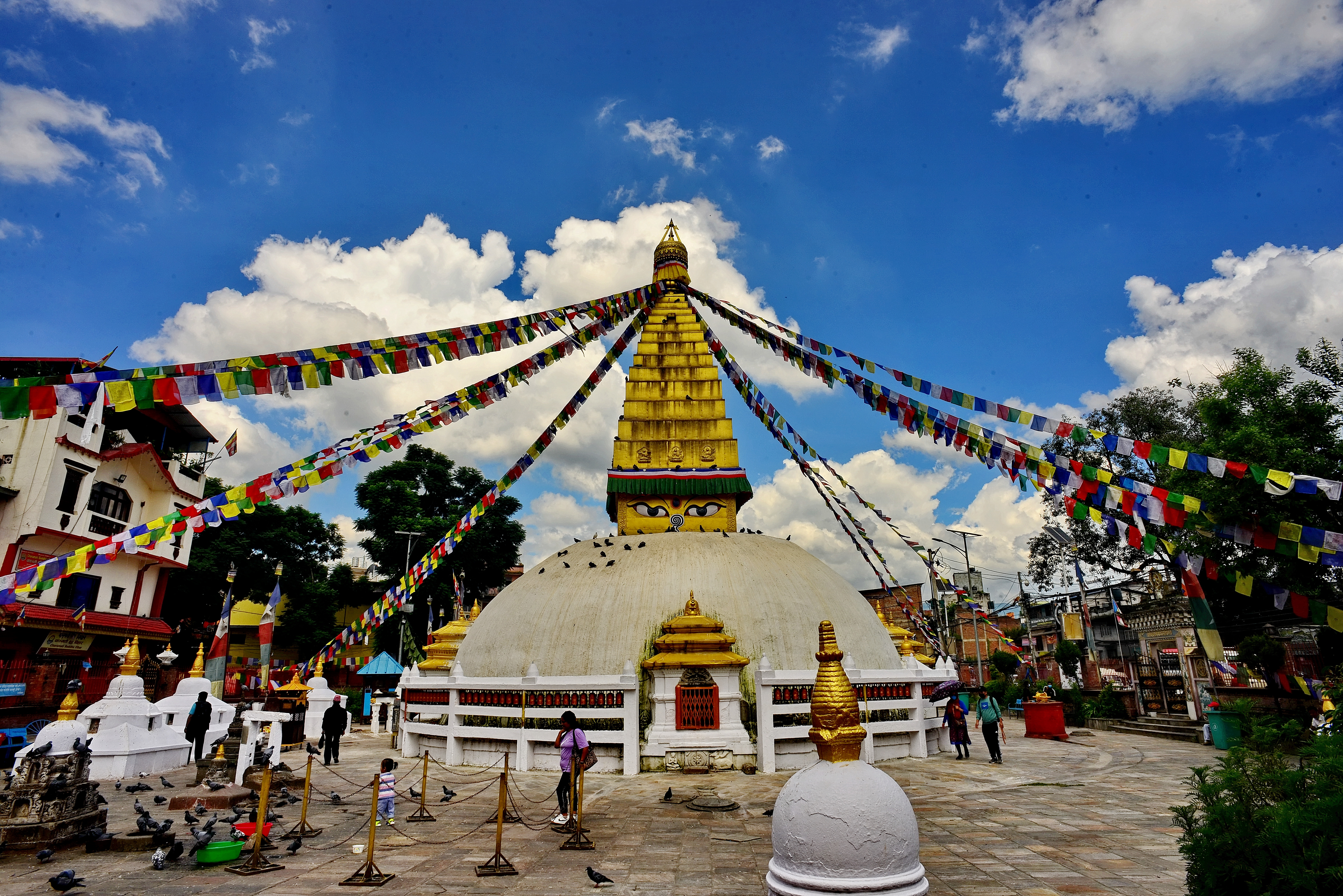

Religion
- Affiliation: Buddhism

Location
- Location: Kathmandu, Nepal
- Interactive map of Charumati Stupa

Architecture
- Creator: Charumati

Charumati Stupa also known as Chabahil Stupa, (and Dhan Dhoj Stupa) is a stupa near Boudha Stupa in the ward of Chabahil, Kathmandu, Nepal.

== History ==
It was built by Charumati, daughter of the Indian emperor Ashoka, in the 3rd century BC.

In 2003, Charumati Stupa was restored by the locals as it was crumbling due to the "heavy vehicular traffic on the nearby road". During its restoration process countless artefacts, coins, and manuscripts were found possibly dating back to the Licchavi era. It was again restored in 2015 due to the April 2015 Nepal earthquake.
