= Khandro Rinpoche =

Indian female lama

Khandro Rinpoche མཁའ་འགྲོ་རིན་པོ་ཆེ
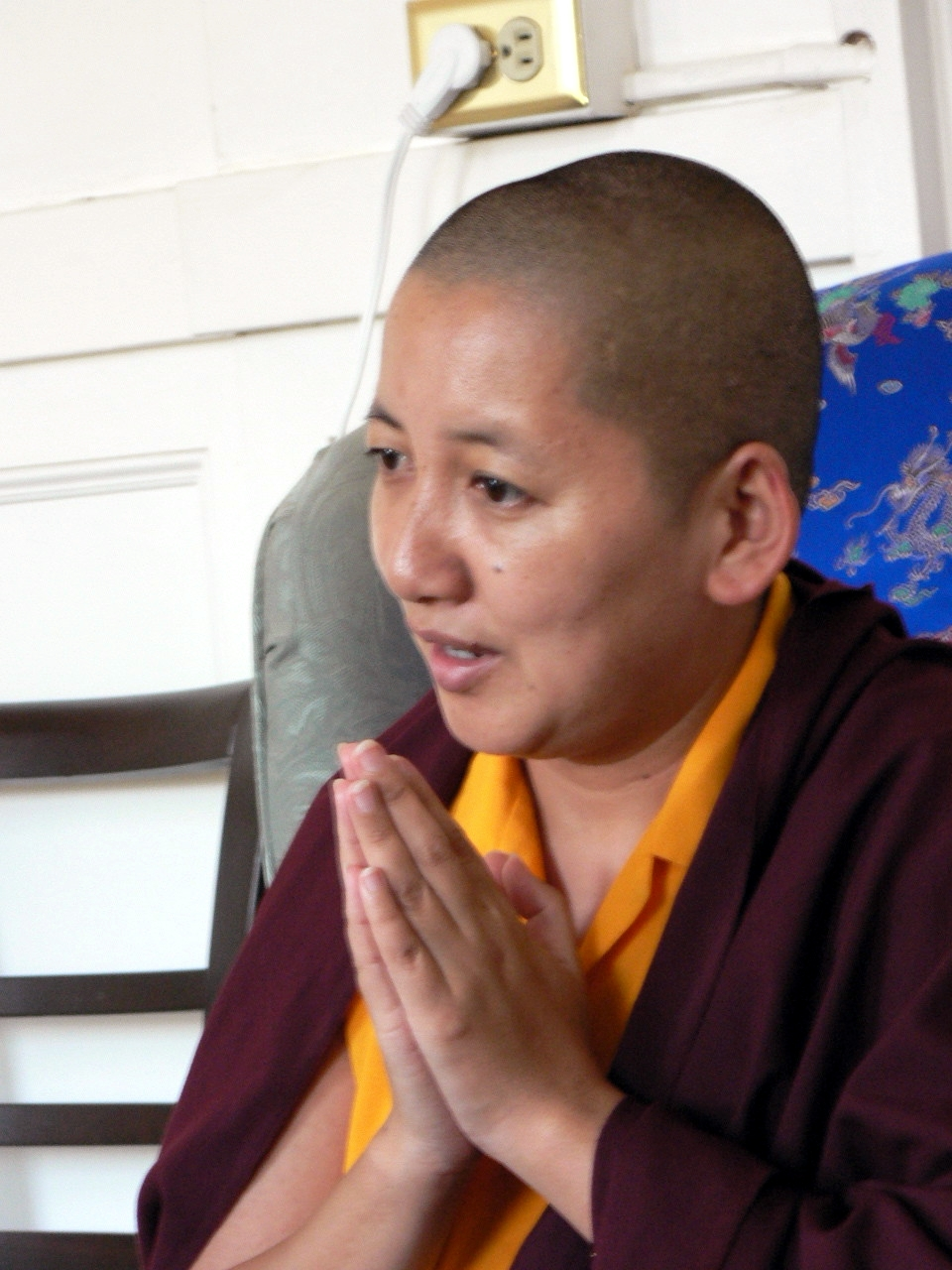
- Title: Her Eminence Mindrolling Jetsün Khandro Rinpoche

Personal life
- Born: Tsering Paldrön Kalimpong, India
- Education: St. Joseph's Convent, Wynberg Allen, and St. Mary's Convent
- Website: khandrorinpoche.org

Religious life
- Religion: Tibetan Buddhism
- School: Kagyu; Nyingma

Senior posting
- Reincarnation: Urgyen Tsomo

Mindrolling Jetsün Khandro Rinpoche (birth name Tsering Paldrön) is a lama in Tibetan Buddhism. Born in Kalimpong, India and the daughter of the late Mindrolling Trichen, Khandro Rinpoche was recognized by Rangjung Rigpe Dorje, 16th Karmapa at the age of two as the reincarnation of the Great Dakini of Tsurphu Monastery, Urgyen Tsomo, who was one of the most well-known female masters of her time. Khandro Urgyen Tsomo was the consort to Khakyab Dorje, 15th Karmapa Lama (1871–1922) and recognised in this Buddhist tradition as an incarnation of Yeshe Tsogyal. Her name is in fact her title, Khandro being Tibetan for dakini and rinpoche an honorific usually reserved for tulkus that means "precious one."

== Upbringing, training and role ==
Mindrolling Jetsün Khandro Rinpoche is a teacher in both the Kagyu and Nyingma schools. She speaks fluent English, Standard Tibetan, and Hindi and has completed a Western education at St. Joseph's Convent, Wynberg Allen School, Mussoorie, and St. Mary's Convent, both in India. She has taught in Europe, North America and Southeast Asia since 1987. She has established and heads the Samten Tse Retreat Center in Mussoorie, India, and she is also resident teacher at Lotus Garden Retreat Center in Virginia, USA. She is also actively involved with the administration of the Mindrolling Monastery in Dehradun, India. Additionally, she is interested in interfaith dialogue and currently sits on the Board of World Religious Leaders for the Elijah Interfaith Institute.

According to Judith Simmer-Brown:

Rinpoche has always been careful not to cast herself as a feminist in the Western sense. One could think that she has been careful in this way for political reasons, but I think it’s more than that. I think she understands something very deep about her Western students: we need to go more deeply, egolessly, into our own gender issues so as not to be ensnared by gender. Then we could embrace our gender and act without the kind of confusion and resentment that usually haunts us. I really learned that from her.

== See also ==
- Urgyen Tsomo

== Bibliography ==
- This Precious Life: Tibetan Buddhist Teachings on the Path to Enlightenment, Shambhala Publications (2003), ISBN 1-59030-174-9
- How Not to Miss the Point: The Buddha’s Wisdom for a Life Well Lived, Shambhala Publications (2025), ISBN 9781611808568

== Other Texts online ==
- Compassion and Wisdom by Venerable Khandro Rinpoche
- Living the Dharma by Khandro Rinpoche
