= Urgyen Tsomo =

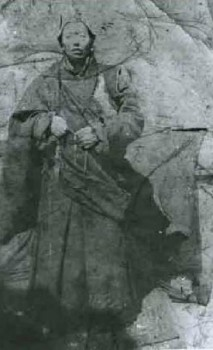
- Urgyen Tsomo

Personal life
- Born: 1897 Tibet
- Died: 1961 (aged 63–64) Sikkim
- Spouse: Khakyab Dorje

Religious life
- Religion: Tibetan Buddhism

Senior posting
- Based in: Asia

Urgyen Tsomo (1897–1961) was a prominent Tibetan Buddhist female master who was known as the Great Dakini of Tsurphu (Tsurpu Khandro Chenmo). She was the consort of the Khakyab Dorje, 15th Karmapa Lama. She was considered by other masters to be the reincarnation (emanation) of Yeshe Tsogyal, the consort of Padmasambhava of the 8th century, who spread Buddhism in Tibet.

Her emanation has similarly been recognized in Mindrolling Jetsün Khandro Rinpoche.

== Biography ==
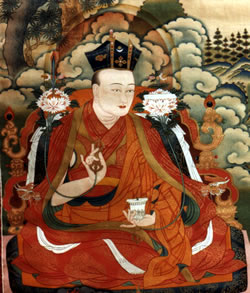
Khakyab Dorje, 15th Karmapa Lama who married Urgyen Tsomo

Urgyen Tsomo was a young woman who lived with her family in the Tsurphu valley. According to a terma (a tradition of continuous revelation in Tibetan Buddhism), when the 15th Karmapa Lama fell sick during his old age, it was predicted that he would marry a particular person, a dakini (a type of spirit in Vajrayana Buddhism) in human form who would cure his disease and extend his life. The terma also indicated the location where such a woman would be found. Khakhyab Dorje, who had dreamed of the location where he would find such a girl, went in search of her. Urgyen Tsomo was identified in the Tsurpu village. She was formally requested to come to the Tsurpu Monastery of the 15th Karmapa Lama to become his consort and treat him for his sickness. Urgyen Tsomo served the 15th Karmapa Lama with devotion using her spiritual power, which is believed to have cured him of his sickness, extending his life for many more years.

It is also said that Urgyen Tsomo was the reincarnation (emanation) of Yeshe Tsogyal, the wife of Padmasambhava of the 8th century, an Indian tantric master who established the Nyingma school of Tibetan Buddhism in Tibet. Following the death of the Karmapa, Urgyen Tsomo moved to a retreat in the monastery with her sadhana and became a hermitess. Through continuous recitation of mantra, she achieved a "profound level of experience and realization". She became highly revered and was shown the same respect as would be given a lama. On special occasions, Urgyen Tsomo was given a seat of honour on a throne which was "as high as Khyentse or Kongtrul". In 1959, she moved from Tibet along with the 16th Karmapa and settled down in a nunnery near the Karmapa's monastery in Sikkim, where she died after a few years. Tulku Urgyen Rinpoche, who had met her in Tibet, called her a very special person, a great dakini.

== Reincarnation ==
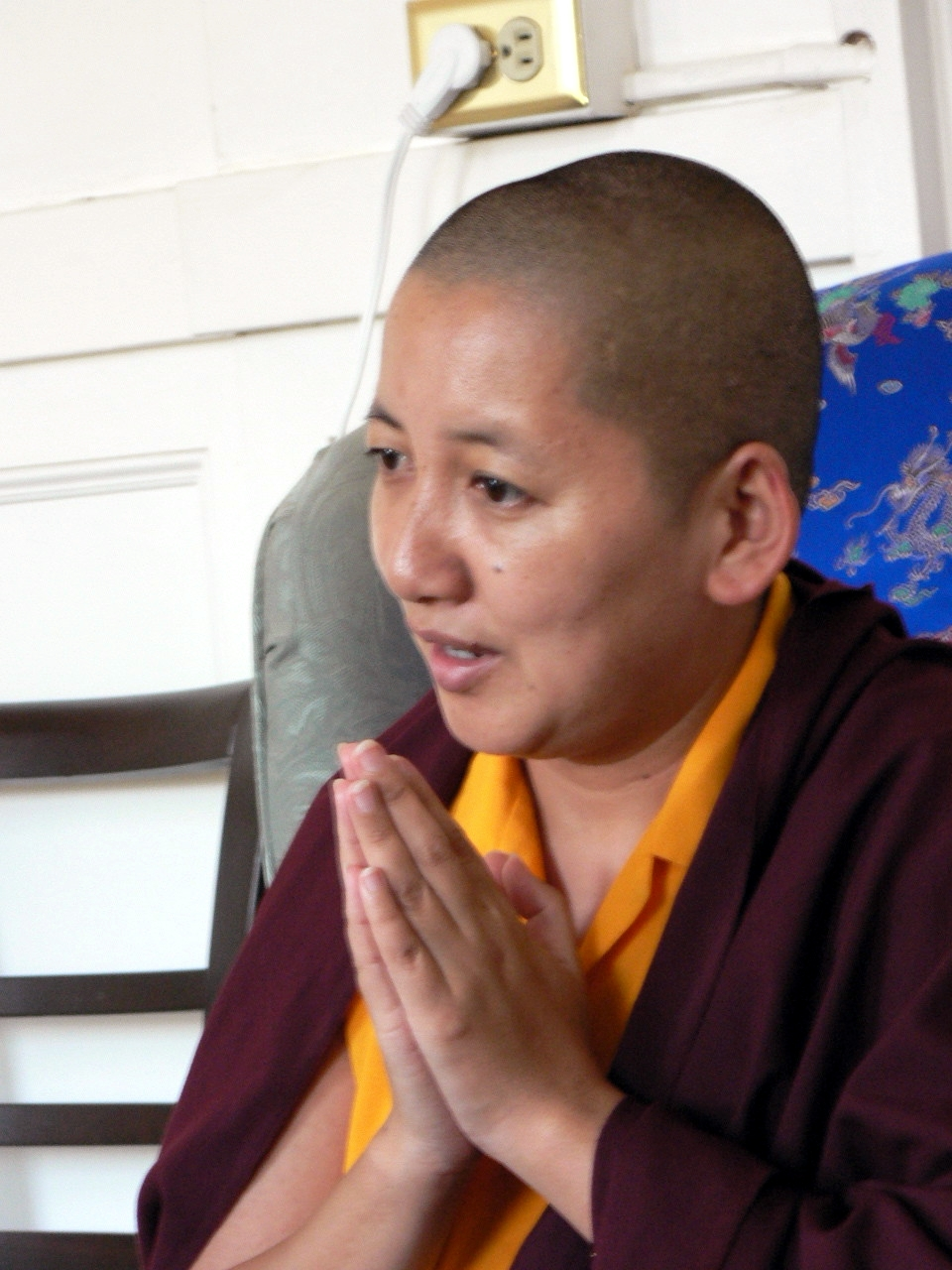
Jetsün Khandro Rinpoche in 2007.

Before her death, Urgyen Tsomo told her students that she would be reborn in the northeastern part of India. This prophecy was fulfilled when her emanation was identified as Khandro Rinpoche, found in Kalimpong in India. The 16th Karamapa in Sikkim had also identified her when she was 10 months old as the reincarnation of Khandro Urgyen Tsomo or the Great Dakini of Tsurphu.

She is now known as Her Eminence Mindrolling Jetsün Khandro Rinpoche and she teaches Tibetan Buddhism widely, unlike her predecessors. She is now the perpetuator of the Mindrolling lineage and is considered a tulku within the Kagyu lineage, with links to the Nyingma and Kagyu lineages.

== Bibliography ==
- Haas, Michaela (11 June 2013). Dakini Power: Twelve Extraordinary Women Shaping the Transmission of Tibetan Buddhism in the West. Shambhala Publications. ISBN 978-0-8348-2837-7.
- Kunsang, Lama; Pemo, Lama; Aubele, Marie (2012). History of the Karmapas: The Odyssey of the Tibetan Masters with the Black Crown. Shambhala Publications. ISBN 978-1-55939-390-4.
- Novick, Rebecca McClen (2005). Portraits of Tibetan Buddhist Masters. University of California Press. ISBN 978-0-520-23973-9.
- Tsomo, Karma Lekshe (25 August 2014). Eminent Buddhist Women. SUNY Press. ISBN 978-1-4384-5130-5.
