= Atsara Sale =

Atsara Salé (alternative spellings include Atsara Sale, Atsara Sahle, and Arya Salé) was an 8th-century practitioner of Vajrayana Buddhism from South India. A student of both the dakini Yeshe Tsogyal and the great master Padmasambhava, the co-founders of Tibetan Buddhism. He is known for being one of Yeshe Tsogyal's main consorts along with Padmasambhava, and for writing one of Yeshe Tsogyal's biographies.

Born into a poor family, Atsara Salé was sold into slavery and taken to Bhaktapur, Nepal where he was sold again into the service of a powerful noble family. At the instruction of Padmasambhava, Yeshe Tsogyal traveled to Nepal to find Atsara Sale, her predicted consort. He accompanied Yeshe Tsogyal for the remainder of his life, and together they undertook extensive spiritual retreat practices and karmamudra practices in Nepal, Tibet, and Bhutan.

== History ==
What is known of the life and spiritual attainments of Atsara Salé come from the biographies of Yeshe Tsogyal.

In 795 CE, Yeshe Tsogyal traveled to Nepal to meet Atsara Sale, her prophesied consort to offer support on the path of spiritual maturation. As Padmasambhava exhorted Yeshe Tsogyal,

So go to the Valley of Nepal where there is a sixteen-year-old youth with a mole on his right breast, who is an emanation of the Buddha Hero Hayagriva called Atsara Sale. He has wandered there from Serling in India. Find him, and make him your ally ….

After raising enough money to buy his contract from his owners, Yeshe Tsogyal and Atsara Sale then returned together to Tibet. Along the way, they went to some of the caves famous for being places where Padmasambhava practiced meditation with his consorts, including the meditation caves of Asura and Yanglesho and there met and practiced with Belmo Sakya Dema, Padmasambhava's Nepali consort.

At one point, during one of his retreats with Yeshe Tsogyal, at Tidro, Atsara Salé is said to have left her alone in their isolated retreat cave once he realized that the religious practice she was embarking upon were far more advanced than he was capable of undertaking and also that the very cold winter was more than he could tolerate. Some versions of the story say that he did indeed leave their join retreat to serve as one of Padmasambhava's attendants, yet he had thought there were ample provisions for Yeshe Tsogyal to continue on alone. Yeshe Tsogyal practices with a diligence that takes her to the brink of starvation, and spiritual awakening, and then Padmasambhava goes to her to bring her out of retreat. She is unharmed and regains full health. Atsara Salé and Yeshe Tsogyal reconcile.

After this, they traveled together with others to Senge Dzong, in Bhutan to continue with their meditation practices.

From the biographies of other well known practitioners of the time, such as Langlab Jangchub Dorje, a student of Atsara Salé, it is clear that Atsara Salé was also a practitioner of Vajrakilaya. Yeshe Tsogyal was a renowned Vajrakilaya practitioner and it is likely that he received these teachings from her or directly from Padmasambhava.

As one of her main disciples, Atsara Salé was with Yeshe Tsogyal when she died in his incarnation as Gyelwa Jangchub, the author of one of Yeshe Tsogyal's biographies.

== Incarnations ==
Gyelwa Jangchub, an 8th-century monk, minister to the then Tibetan emperor Trisong Detsen, translator, and student of Padmasambhava, was said to be an incarnation of Atsara Sale. He is known for being the author of one of Yeshe Tsogyal's biographies.

Machig Labdron’s husband, Topabhadra was an 11th-century Tibetan incarnation of Atsara Salé.

The contemporary living terton H.E. Namkha Drimed Rabjam Rinpoche is believed to be an incarnation of Atsara Salé and is the head of the Ripa Vajrayana Buddhist lineage.

Another tulku of both Yeshe Tsogyal and Atsara Salé, together, is Tulku Dakyong Rolpai Dorje, a Chöd master from eastern Tibet.

== Spiritual lineages of Yeshe Tsogyal and Atsara Salé ==
The contemporary Ripa lineage of Buddhism includes a terma cycle that comes directly from Yeshe Tsogyal and Atsara Salé.
