= Chabahil =

Chabahil चाःबही
- Neighborhood in Kathmandu
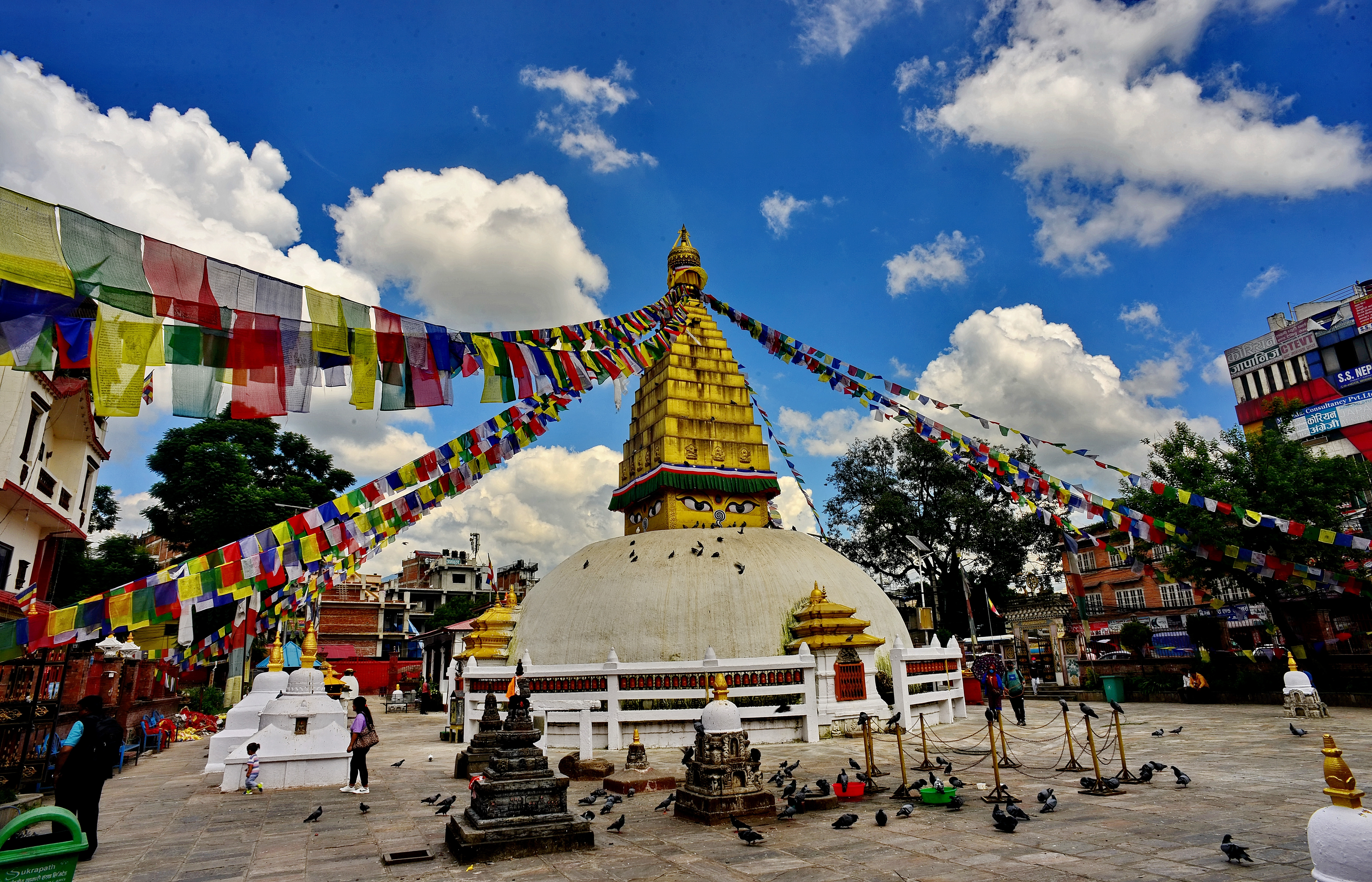
- Chabahil Stupa / Dhando Chaitya

- Location in Kathmandu Chabahil (Bagmati Province)
- Coordinates: 27°43′02″N 85°20′47″E
- Country: Nepal
- Province: Bagmati Province
- District: Kathmandu

Population (2011)
  - Total: 85,195
  - Ethnicities: Newar
- Time zone: UTC+5:45 (NST)
- Postal Code: 44602
- Area code: 01

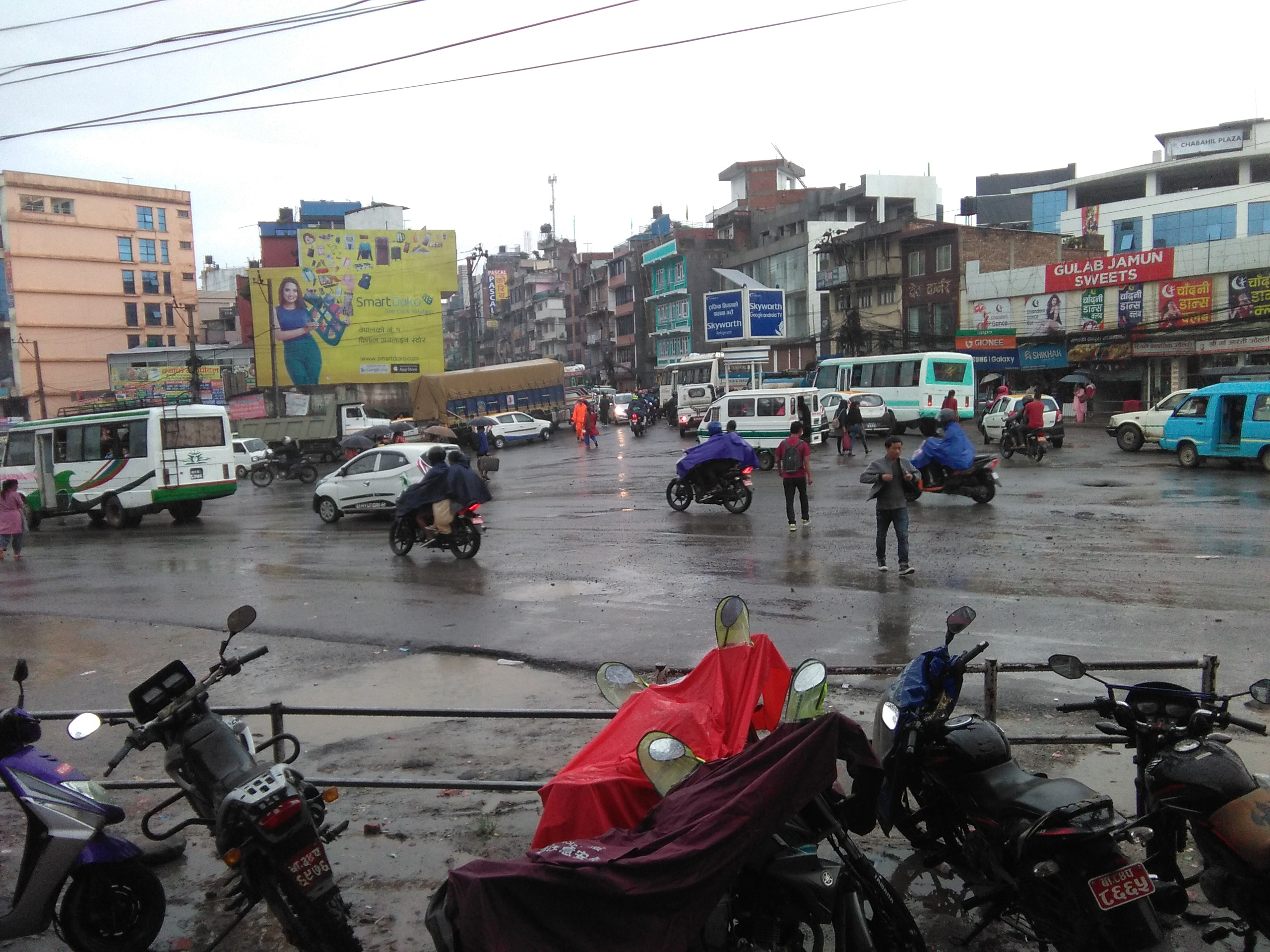
The main Chowk (square) of Chabahil

Chabahil (Nepali: चाबहिल) (also Kathmandu Metropolitan City Ward 07) is an ancient neighborhood in northeast Kathmandu in Nepal. It is famous for its Licchavi stupa, called the Dhando Chaitya, considered by many historians to be the oldest Buddhist Stupa in the valley. Currently, Chabahil has become a thriving residential and commercial area of Kathmandu. Two of the most important temples in Kathmandu, Pashupatinath and Guhyeswari are situated very close to Chabahil. These two temples, dedicated to Lord Shiva and his consort Sati are considered to be more than a thousand years old.

== Charumati Vihara ==
The stupa has attracted Buddhist monks and other pilgrims over the centuries. According to the inscriptions found within it, it was built by the Indian princess Charumati, daughter of Indian Emperor Ashoka, who was married to a Nepalese prince in Kathmandu. Near the Charumati Vihara, there is a beautiful stone statue of Buddha that is a meter high.

== Chandra Binayak Temple ==
Another landmark located in the town is the temple of Chandra Binayak Ganesh, the Hindu god with the head of an elephant and the body of a man. which is the youngest son of shiva Hindu god. The temple, located on the main market street of Chabahil, is one of the four temples of Binayak in the Kathmandu Valley. There are also many gods and goddesses in the temple like Saraswati, Bhairav, Visnu, Hanuman, Buddha, etc. Devotees flock to this century-old temple especially on Tuesdays (and other days when Lord Ganesh is worshiped).
