= Yeshe Tsogyal =

First female lama in Tibetan Buddhism

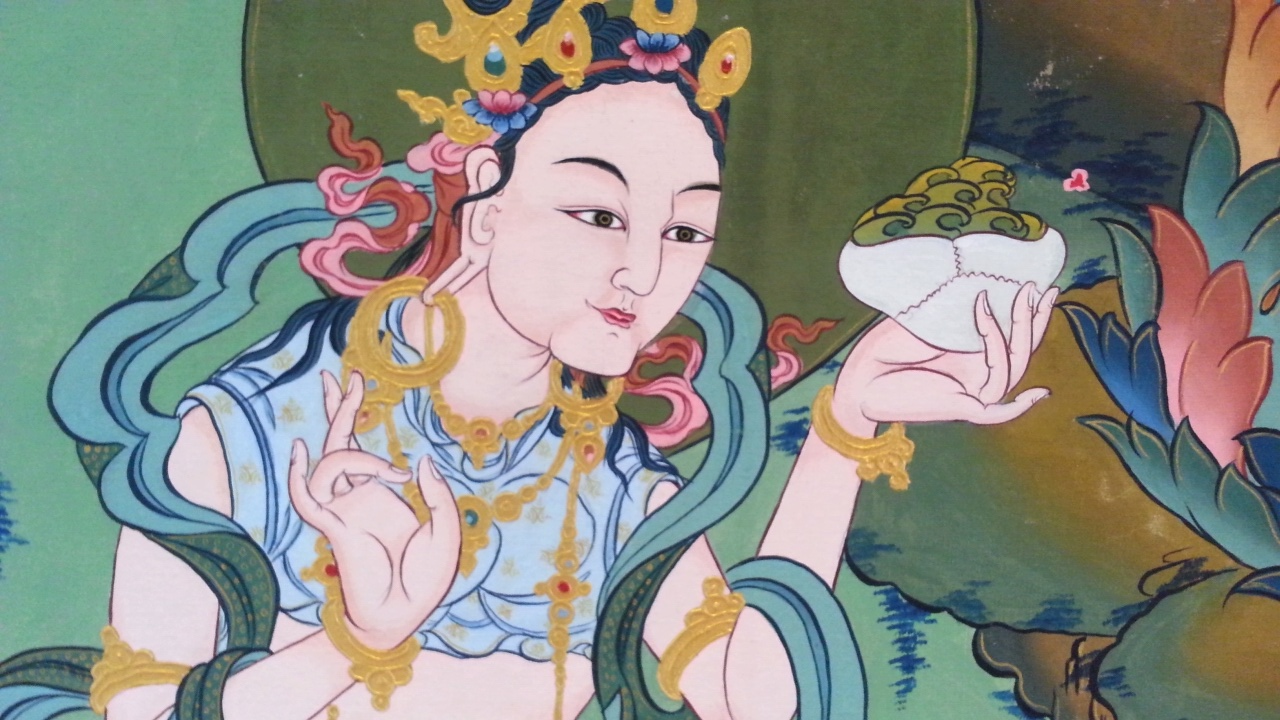
- Yeshe Tsogyal

Religious life
- Religion: Tibetan Buddhism

- Yeshe Tsogyal

Tibetan name
- Tibetan: ཡེ་ཤེས་མཚོ་རྒྱལ
Transcriptions
- Wylie: ye shes mtsho rgyal
- THL: Yeshé Tsogyel
- Lhasa IPA: [jeɕe tsʰocɛ]

Chinese name
- Traditional Chinese: 耶喜措嘉
- Simplified Chinese: 益西措嘉
Transcriptions
Standard Mandarin
- Hanyu Pinyin: Yìxī Cuòjié

Yeshe Tsogyal (c. 757 or 777 – 817 CE), also known as "Victorious Ocean of Knowledge", "Knowledge Lake Empress" (Wylie: ye shes mtsho rgyal, ཡེ་ཤེས་མཚོ་རྒྱལ), or by her Sanskrit name Jñānasāgarā "Knowledge Ocean", or by her clan name "Lady Kharchen", attained enlightenment in her lifetime and is considered the Mother of Tibetan Buddhism. Yeshe Tsogyal is the highest woman in the Nyingma Vajrayana lineage. Some sources say she, as Princess of Karchen, was either a wife or consort of Tri Songdetsen, emperor of Tibet, when she began studying Buddhism with Padmasambhava, who became her main karmamudrā consort. Padmasambhava is a founder-figure of the Nyingma tradition of Tibetan Buddhism, and is considered as a second buddha of our era. She is known to have revealed terma with Padmasambhava and was also the main scribe for these terma. Later, Yeshe Tsogyal also hid many of Padmasambhava's terma on her own, under the instructions of Padmasambhava for future generations.

Born a princess in the region of Kharchen, Tibet, in about 777 CE, she fled from arranged marriages until captured for Tri Songdetsen. Yeshe Tsogyal lived for approximately 99 years and is a preeminent figure in the Nyingma school of Tibetan Buddhism and a role model for contemporary spiritual practitioners. Although often referred to as being Padamasambhava's main consort, Yeshe Tsogyal was primarily a spiritual master and teacher in her own right.

Based on her spiritual accomplishments, the Nyingma and Karma Kagyu schools of Tibetan Buddhism recognize Yeshe Tsogyal as a female Buddha. The translators of Lady of the Lotus-Born, the namtar, or spiritual biography, that Yeshe Tsogyal left as a terma, observe:

As Dodrup Tenpai Nyima makes clear, beings able to reveal Termas must have at least the realization of the Perfection Stage practices. On the other hand, the one who originates the Treasures must have the supreme attainment of Buddhahood. Lady of the Lotus-Born is thus a testimony of Yeshe Tsogyal's enlightenment.

== Biography and historicity ==
Given Yeshe Tsogyal's important place in the various schools of Tibetan Buddhism, there are questions about whether she is an actual historical figure. There are at least four translations of Yeshe Tsogyal's spiritual biography in English, and one in French. Yet,

From a historical perspective, however, this hagiography of Ye she's mtsho rgyal leaves some important questions unanswered... More basic yet is the question of whether Ye she's mtsho rgyal is a historical figure at all. The problem is that none of the contemporary epigraphy ever mentions a Ye shes mtsho rgyal, nor a Mkhar chen bra' (her clan title), at least as far as we know.

Even so, in another publication, this same scholar writes,

There are no contemporary inscriptions that mention her, and so there is some question about whether she is really a historical figure. But she appears at a relatively early point—by at least the twelfth century—in the mythologized accounts of the conversion of Tibet to a Buddhist country, and references to her clan title Mkhar chen Bza (Karchen Za) also make her historicity credible. It is certainly possible that there was such a queen who became involved in Buddhist meditative practices, even if her story was elaborated greatly as the narrative of Tibet's conversion developed.

So whether there is enough historical evidence to confirm or deny Yeshe Tsogyal as a historical figure, from the perspective of the spiritual traditions within which she is prominent, the details of her life are rich. Here are some of the details of Yeshe Tsogyal's conception and birth:

From the mouth of a lotus was born
The swift goddess, heroic liberator
Who went forth in human form
Amid the snowy mountains of Tibet.

According to legend, Yeshe Tsogyal was born in the same manner as the Buddha, a mantra sounding as her mother gave birth painlessly. She is considered a reincarnation of the Buddha's own mother, Maya. Her name, "Wisdom Lake Queen" (Wylie: ye shes mtsho rgyal), derives from her birth causing a nearby lake to double in size.

Her spiritual inclinations were present from a very young age and Yeshe Tsogyal wanted to pursue a life of dharma practice rather than marry. She felt so strongly about this, that she ran away and had to be brought back by force. At the age of sixteen, she was compelled into an unwanted arranged marriage with the then-emperor of Tibet, Tri Songdetsen.

It was after their marriage, that Tri Songdetsen invited Padmasambhava to come to Tibet from India and propagate the Buddhist teachings. Yeshe Tsogyal was given by Tri Songdetsen to Padmasambhava as an offering. Padmasambhava freed Yeshe Tsogyal and she became Padmasambhava's main disciple and consort.

== Spiritual life and attainments ==
=== In the body of a woman ===
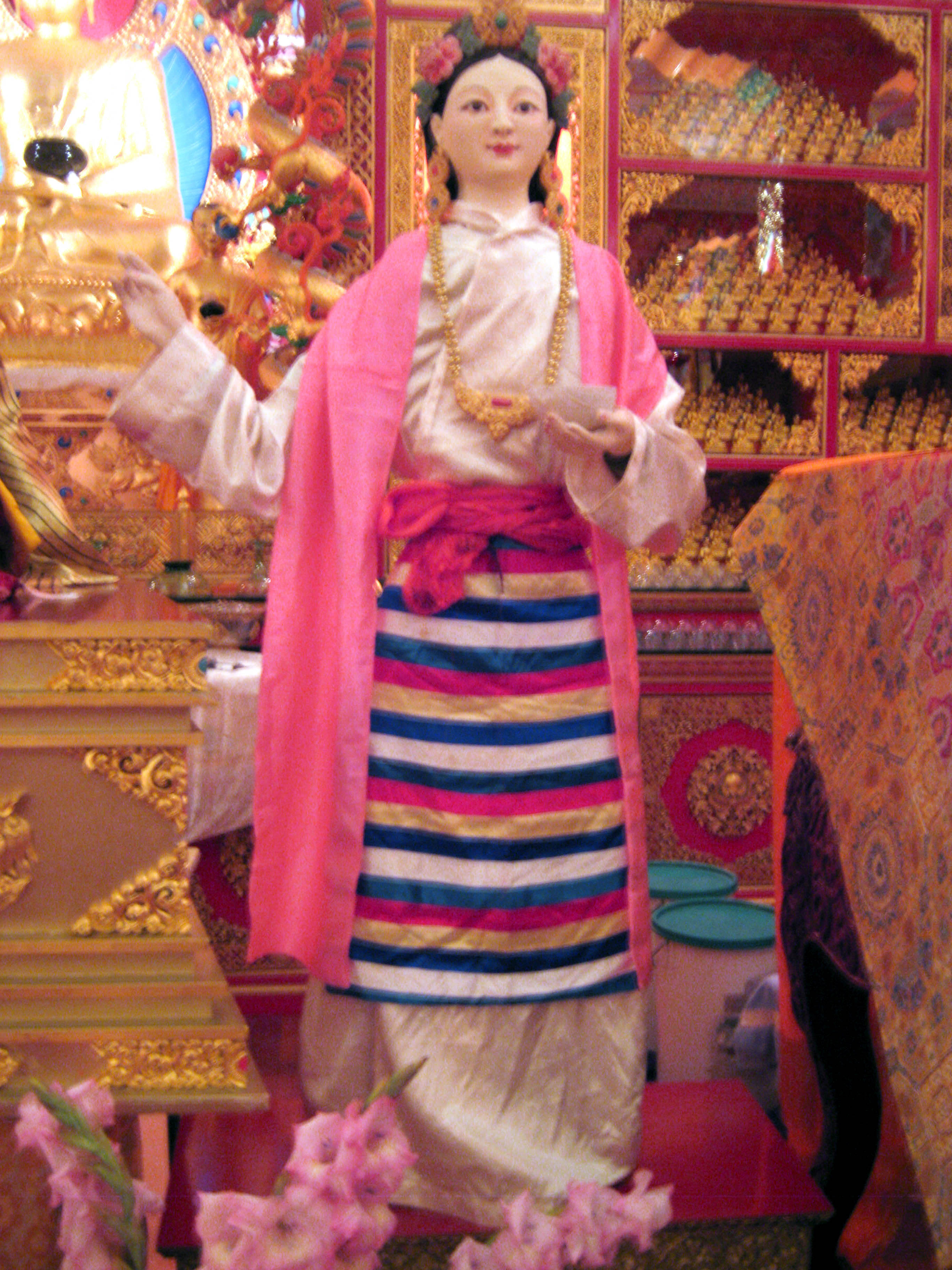
Yeshe Tsogyal statue, Kagyu Samye Ling Monastery and Tibetan Centre, Scotland

As to the question of the place of female practitioners in Tibetan Buddhism, Yeshe Tsogyal has been an important role model. When she herself asked about "her inferior female body" (a common theme in the biographies of female spiritual practitioners), Padmasambhava advised Yeshe Tsogyal that far from being a hindrance to enlightenment, as was generally accepted, a woman's body is an asset: "The basis for realizing enlightenment is a human body. Male or female, there is no great difference. But if she develops the mind bent on enlightenment the woman’s body is better."

After many years of serious study and meditative practice, Yeshe Tsogyal's level of spiritual awakening, enlightenment, was equal to that of Padmasambhava.

=== Her spiritual practices ===
Yeshe Tsogyal is also known to have spent many years in isolated meditation retreat. She accomplished several different cycles of tantric spiritual practices that she received from Padmasambhava and various wisdom beings including the practices of Vajrakilaya, Zhitro, tummo (inner heat), and karmamudrā practice.

For example, one scholar relates how Yeshe Tsogyal received the empowerment to practice Zhitro from a wisdom being, a vidyādhara:

After succeeding in a variety of feats, including beheading a tiger, she gains access to an elaborate palace where she receives esoteric initiations from several vidyādharas and buddhas. She returns to Chingpu and after a year is robbed by seven bandits whom she then converts to Buddhist practice. She proceeds with the bandits on a magic carpet to the place Oḍḍiyāna where they all receive peaceful and wrathful deity practice (zhitro) initiations from a vidyādhara, who gives her the secret name Kharchen Za and cavorts in bliss with her.

All of these practices brought Yeshe Tsogyal to awakening. Among lay Tibetans, she is understood as a fully enlightened Buddha who takes the form of an ordinary woman so as to be accessible to the average person, "who, for the time being, do not see her Vajravarahi form as a fully perfected deity."

=== Students ===
At the time of her death, Yeshe Tsogyal is known to have had eleven main students, both women and men. Yeshe Tsogyal's Zur Lineage holders include:

- Karchen Zhonnu Dronma
- Monmo Tashi Khyidren, or Tashi Children (of Bhutan)
- Shelkar Dorje Tsomo, or Dorje Tsomo (of Shelkar)
- Be Yeshe Nyingpo
- Ma Rinchen Chok
- Odren Zhonu Pel, or Odren Pelgyi Zhonnu
- Langlab Gyelwa Jangchub Dorje
- Lasum Gyelwa Jangjub, or Atsara Sale
- Darcha Dorje Pawo
- Ukyi Nyima, or Surya Tepa (of central Tibet)
- Queen Li-za Jangchub Dronma, or Jangchub Drolma (of Khotan), Queen of Tri Songdetsen

All of Yeshe Tsogyal's final teachings were given at the request of one of these eleven main disciples.

Other Tibetan lineage holders include King Mutri Tsenpo, Prince Murum Tsenpo, Princess Ngang-chung Pelgyi Gyelmo. Nepalese lineage holders include Jila Jhipa, Vasudhara, Śākya Dema, Gelong Namkhai Nyingpo (whom she taught in Bhutan), yoginī Demo or Dewamo or Chonema or Dechenmo, Selta, and Lodro Kyi.

Along with the eleven main lineage holders, there were approximately 79 other students present during the final teachings of Yeshe Tsogyal. Some sources say that there were no less than 100 people present for these final teachings.

== Emanations ==
Yeshe Tsogyal is also considered a manifestation of the Bodhisattva Tara. She is also considered to be an emanation of Samantabhadrī, Prajnaparamita, and Vajrayogini. In the Life of Yeshe Tsogyel, Padmasambhava predicted that Yeshe Tsogyel would be reborn as Machig Labdrön; her consort, Atsara Sale, would become Topabhadra, Machig’s husband; her assistant and another of Padmasambhava’s consorts, Tashi Khyidren, would be reborn as Machig’s only daughter, and so on. All of the important figures in Tsogyel’s life were to be reborn in the life of Machig Labdron, including Padmasambhava himself, who would become Dampa Sangye.

== See also ==
- Khandro Rinpoche
- Lady of the Lake
- Lamrim Yeshe Nyingpo
- Mandarava
- Urgyen Tsomo
