= Charumati =

Mauryan Princess

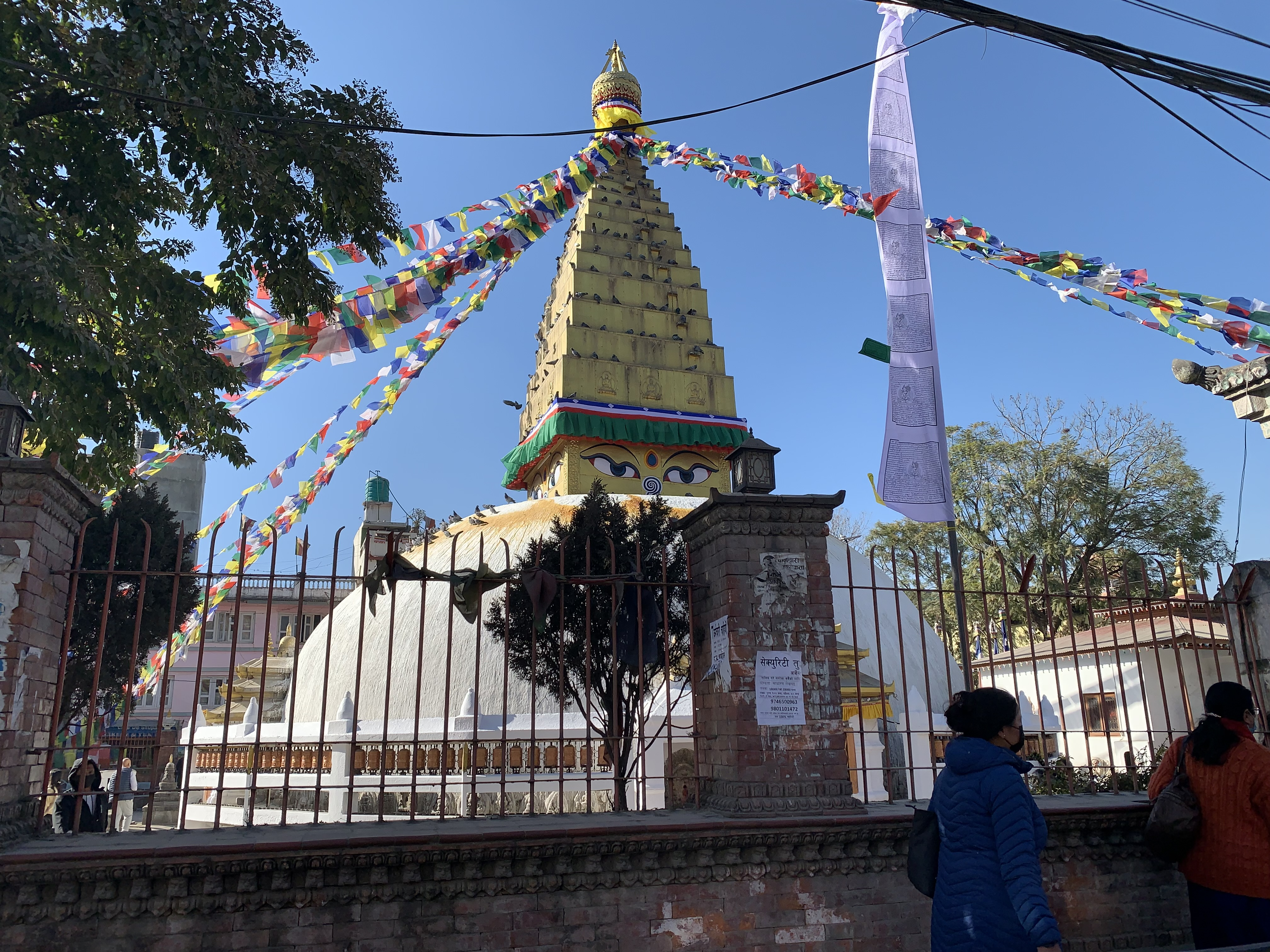
- The Charumati Vihara stupa (pictured) was built by Charumati
- Spouse: Devapala
- Father: Ashoka

Charumati (Brahmi: 𑀘𑀸 𑀭𑀼𑀼 𑀫𑀓𑀻), sometimes called Charuwati or Charumitra, was a daughter of the Indian Maurya Emperor Ashoka and his chief queen, Empress Asandhimitra. She was trained in nursing and caregiving by her foster mother and is believed to have tended to Emperor Ashoka in his later years.

She was married to a Nepalese prince, Devapala Kshatriya, and settled in the Kathmandu Valley. She is credited with founding the monastery of Chabahil (called Charumati Vihara), which is considered one of the oldest extant Buddhist monasteries of Nepal.

== Life ==
Charumati accompanied her father Ashoka on his Buddhist pilgrimage along with his spiritual teacher Upagupta, and according to later traditions, she helped establish the Buddhist order in Nepal. Several scriptures and chronicles, including Nepalese Buddhist oral traditions, describe her journey and role in spreading the teachings of the Buddha in the Himalayas.

While references to her were found in texts, no archaeological proof existed until 2003, when a brick bearing inscriptions with her name was discovered during restoration of the Dhando Chaitya in Chabahil. The upper face is inscribed with Cha Ru Wa Ti in Brahmi, and with Cha Ru Wa Ti Dhande / He Tu Pra Bha in Bhujimol script. The brick measures 35.5 cm × 23 cm × 7 cm and weighs 8.6 kg.

== Charumati Vihara (Chabahil Stupa) ==
The Charumati Stupa or Chabahil Stupa is a large Buddhist monument built under her patronage in Kathmandu, Nepal. It remains an important religious site and is surrounded by monasteries and Shakya households who maintain the daily rituals and festivals associated with it. The vihara is unique in that it links the Mauryan imperial Buddhist legacy with the localized Newar Buddhist traditions of the Kathmandu Valley.

== Lineage and Present-day Descendants ==
Charumati’s marriage to Devapala symbolically united the Mauryan imperial house of India with the Kshatriya-Buddhist ruling clans of Nepal. According to both Buddhist chronicles and oral traditions preserved by Newar Buddhist priests, her descendants continued to live around the Chabahil area.

Today, several families of the Shakya community in Chabahil and surrounding localities claim descent from the line of Devapala and Charumati. These families are recognized as hereditary custodians of the Charumati Bihar and play a key role in maintaining its rituals. This connection is often highlighted as a living link between the Mauryan bloodline and present-day Nepalese Buddhist traditions.

== Legacy ==
- Establishment of one of the oldest known Buddhist stupas in Nepal.
- Preservation of Mauryan imperial bloodline through intermarriage with Nepalese Kshatriya clans.
- Revered as a symbol of the Maurya–Nepal connection and as a cultural bridge between India and Nepal.

== See also ==
- List of Stupas in Nepal
- Buddhism in Nepal
- Ashoka
- Chabahil
