= List of stupas in Nepal =

Prominent Buddhist shrines in Nepal

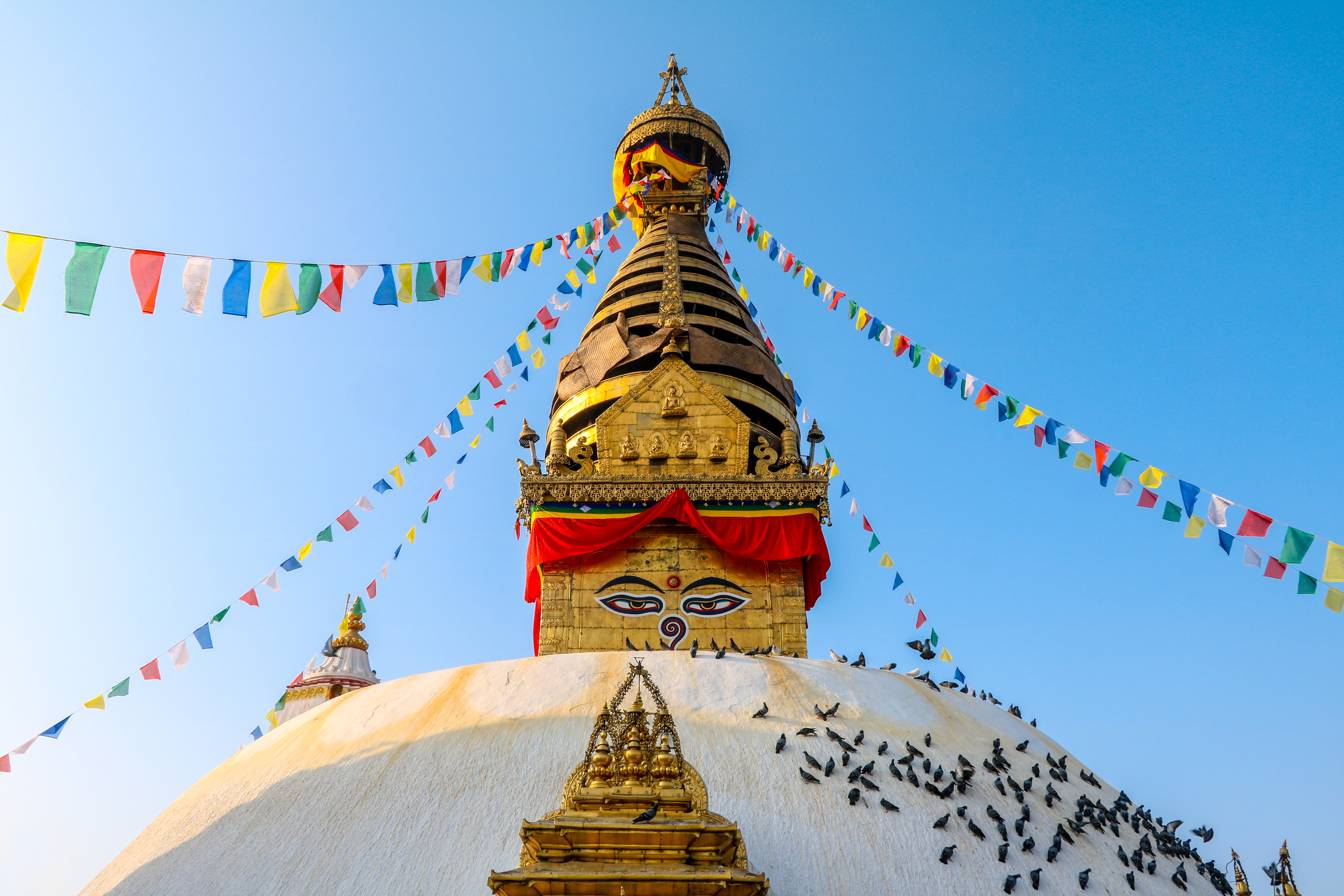
Swayambhunath is one of the oldest known stupas in Nepal.

Stupas in Nepal date back to the Licchavi period; a stupa is a mound-like or hemispherical structure containing relics (such as śarīra – typically the remains of Buddhist monks or nuns) that is used as a place of meditation. Swayambhunath is one of the oldest known buildings in the country and was likely built in the 5th century. It was built in Swayambhu, Kathmandu, where the land was declared as sacred to Siddhartha Gautama (Buddha), by the 3rd Emperor of the Maurya Dynasty Ashoka the Great in the 3rd century BCE. According to the legends, the stupa came out of a sacred lotus at the centre of Kathmandu when the city was a lake.

Ashoka's daughter Charumati, who married a Nepali prince, built Charumati Stupa in the 4th century. Boudhanath is one of the holiest sites in Nepal, it was closed for 18 months after the April 2015 Nepal earthquake, which completely destroyed the top part of the stupa. After the Annexation of Tibet by the People's Republic of China, many refugees from Tibet started to settle in the area and convert it into a "Little Lhasa". Kaathe Swayambhu, a replica of the Swayambhunath that was built in 1650, is located near Thamel. In Lumbini, the place where, according to Buddhist tradition, Queen Mahamayadevi gave birth to the Buddha, there are several stupas including World Peace Pagoda, Myanmar Golden Temple, and Great Drigung Kagyud Lotus Stupa.

The World Peace Pagoda was built by Japanese Buddhists for about US$1 million; near the stupa is the gravestone of a monk who was murdered by an anti-Buddhist group while the building was being built. The Ramagrama stupa contains the relics of the Buddha and it remains untouched in its original form. According to the legends, Ashoka came to the stupa with a plan to open it, however, when he got there a snake god ordered him "not to interfere with the site" so he started to worship the site. Three stupas are recognised as a World Heritage Site by the United Nations Educational, Scientific and Cultural Organization (UNESCO).

== List of stupas ==
Key
†	Denotes UNESCO Heritage Site

Name	Image	Location	Coordinates	Established	Ref(s)
Boudhanath†	height	Kathmandu	27°43′17″N 85°21′43″E	After the 6th century	
Charumati Stupa	height	Kathmandu	27°42′57″N 85°20′45″E	4th century	
The Great Drigung Kagyud Lotus Stupa	height	Lumbini	27°29′03.7″N 83°16′20.7″E	1998	
Kaathe Swayambhu	height	Kathmandu	27.709°N 85.309°E	1650	
Mahabouddha Stupa	height	Kathmandu	27.705°N 85.310°E	6th Century	
Myanmar Golden Temple	height	Lumbini	27°28′33.8″N 83°16′40.2″E	—	
Ramagrama Stupa	height	Parasi	27°29′52″N 83°40′52″E	Discovered in 1899; dates back to 483 BC	
Shanti Stupa	height	Pokhara	28°12′04.6″N 83°56′43.9″E	1947	
Swayambhunath†	height	Kathmandu	27°42′54″N 85°17′24″E	5th century	
World Peace Pagoda†	height	Lumbini	27°29′57.0″N 83°16′35.1″E	2001	
Dharmadhaatu Stupa	height	Thahiti, Kathmandu	27.710°N 85.311°E	15th century	

== See also ==
- Buddhism in Nepal
- Newar Buddhism
- Maya Devi Temple, Lumbini
- Buddhist pilgrimage sites in Nepal
- List of Buddhist stotras in Nepalbhasha
- List of Mahaviharas of Newar Buddhism
- List of monasteries in Nepal
- Bahal, Nepal
