= Shanti Stupa, Pokhara =

Peace pagoda in Pokhara, Nepal

Shanti Stupa
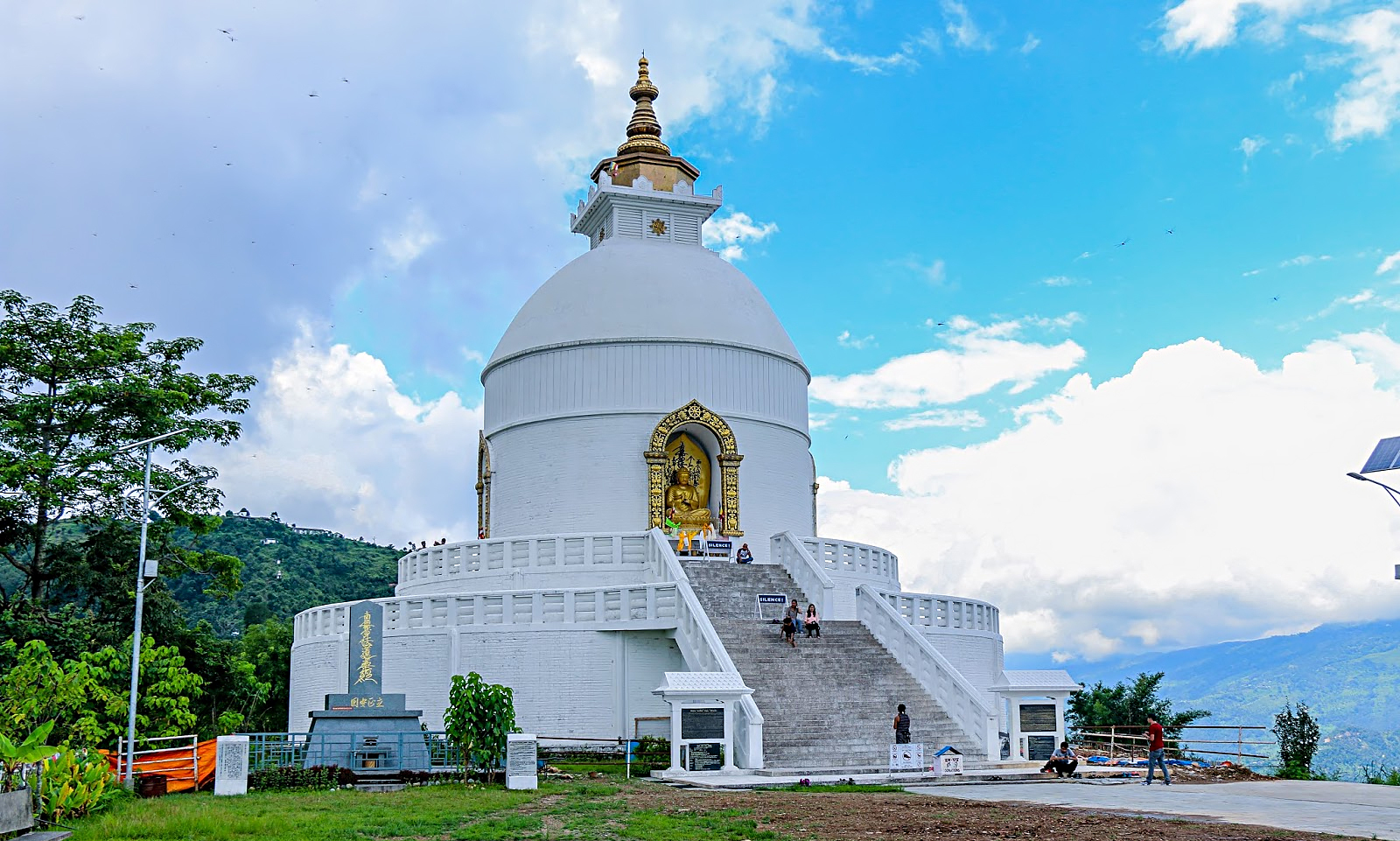

Religion
- Affiliation: Buddhism
- Deity: Buddha

Location
- Location: Gandaki Province, Kaski District
- Country: Nepal
- Interactive map of Shanti Stupa
- Coordinates: 28°12′04″N 83°56′42″E

Architecture
- Type: Stupa

Pokhara Shanti Stupa is a Buddhist monument on Anadu Hill of the former Pumdi Bhumdi Village Development Committee, in the district of Kaski, Nepal (now a part of the city of Pokhara).

Shanti Stupa in Pokhara was built by Nipponzan-Myōhōji monk Morioka Sonin with local supporters under the guidance of Nichidatsu Fujii, a Buddhist monk and the founder of Nipponzan-Myōhōji. Shanti is a Sanskrit word meaning peace, also widely used in the Nepali and Hindi languages, and Shanti Stupa means Peace Pagoda. Shanti Stupa shrine was built as a symbol of peace. Situated at the height of 1100 meters on the Anadu Hill, Nichidatsu Fujii laid the foundation stone along with relics of the Buddha on 12 September 1973.Videos are not allowed on the Peace Pagoda of Pokhara and tourists or visitors can only take pictures.Videos will cost Rs.2000 and TikToks are mentioned specifically to be prohibited. Nepal has two of the eighty peace pagodas in the world: Shanti Stupa in Lumbini, the birthplace of the Buddha and Shanti Stupa in Pokhara. Shanti Stupa in Pokhara has also become a tourist attraction. It provides a panoramic view of the Annapurna range, Pokhara city and Fewa Lake.

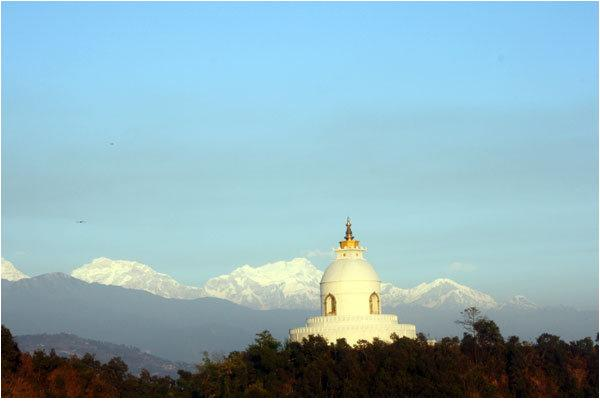
World Peace Pagoda, Pokhara

== Construction ==
Nichidatsu Fujii planned to construct peace pagodas in 1947, in many locations around the world as a symbol of world peace.

Nipponzan-Myōhōji and locals of Pokhara built Shanti Stupa. Morioka Sonin, Dharmashilla Guruma (nun) and Min Bahadur Gurung were the key people in constructing the pagoda. During the construction of Shanti Stupa, workers were arrested several times by the Nepalese government for what was ultimately determined to be false accusations. Morioka Sonin took the initiative of building the Shanti Stupa in Pokhara. Dharmashilla Guruma of Dhamashilla Buddha, Pokhara was very positive about the proposal from Nipponzan-Myōhōji and was involved in creating active participation from the locals in Pokhara. The statue of the first elected deputy defense minister, Min Bahadur Gurung, was placed in front of the Shanti Stupa to honor his land donation. Nichidatsu Fujii laid the foundation stone along with relics of the Buddha on 12 September 1973. On 28 November 1973, the prayer hall, with the statue of the Buddha, and the Guest House were set up. When construction of the pagoda had reached a height of thirty-five feet, Panchayati and the Royal Nepal government requested the destruction of the pagoda and adjacent buildings for security reasons. The building was not officially "passed" by the local government. Even though building the pagoda was off-limits, continuous support from Nipponzan-Myōhōji, monks and local supporters allowed constant construction to continue. Nichidatsu Fujii had prophesied that one day the Shanti Stupa would be rebuilt.

On 21 May 1992, after an eighteen-year uphill battle, the Honorable Girija Prasad Koirala came to the Anadu Hill and re-laid the foundation stone. Construction was completed without obstruction and the inaugural ceremony was conducted in the presence of the Chairman of the Nepali Congress Party and former Prime Minister Girija Prasad Koirala on 30 October 1999.

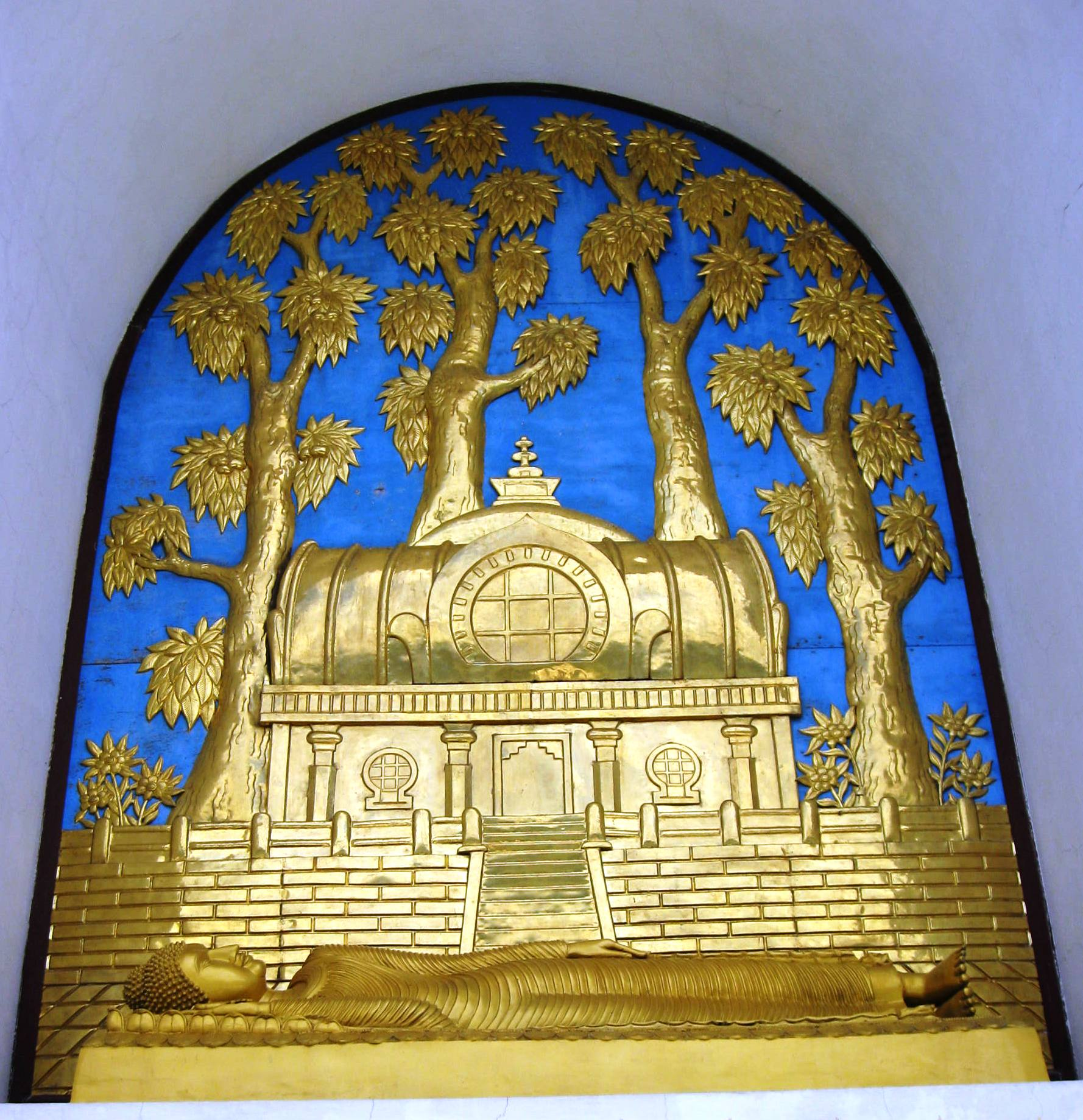
Statue of Buddha

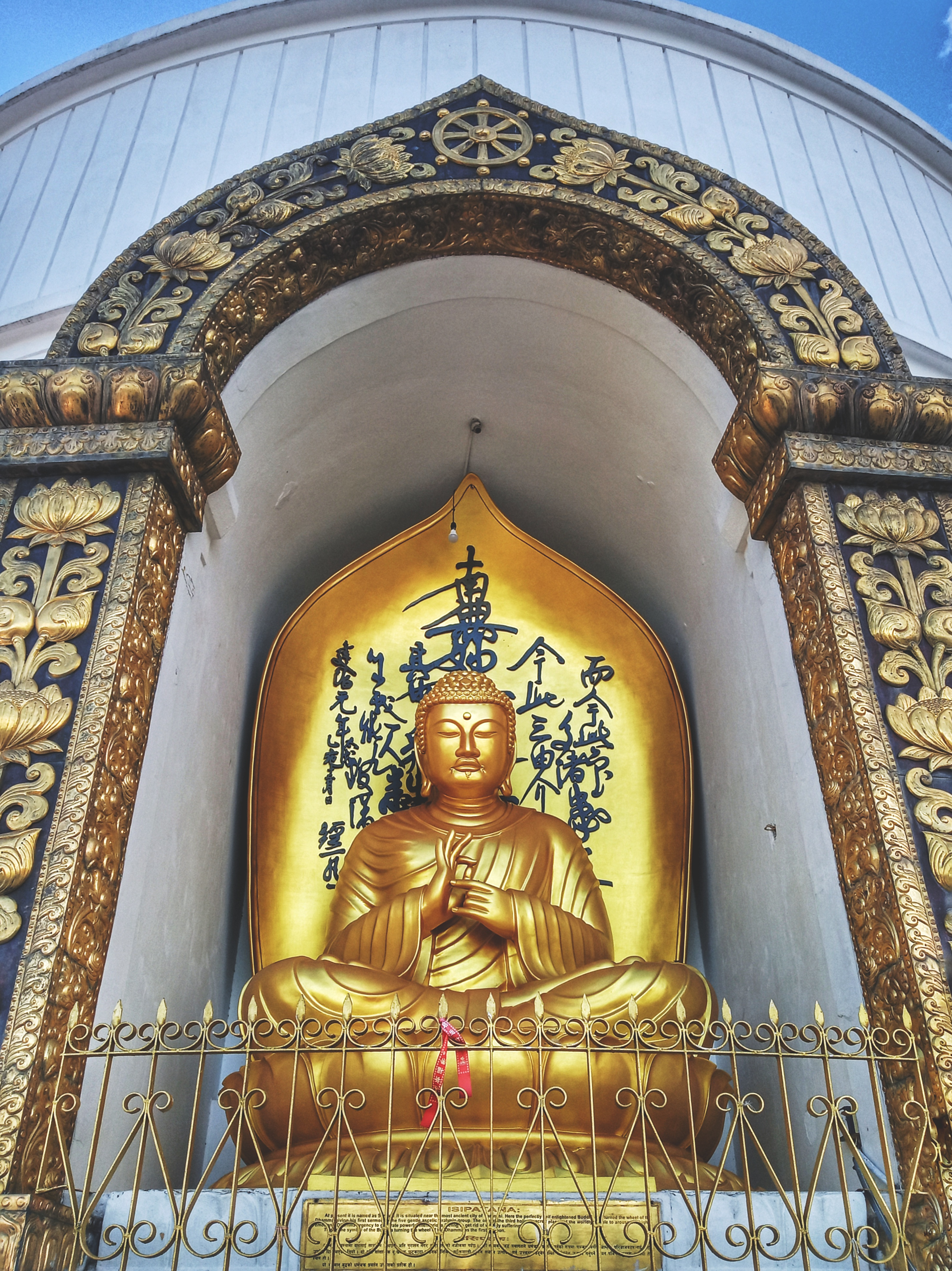
Buddha Statue at Shanti Stupa

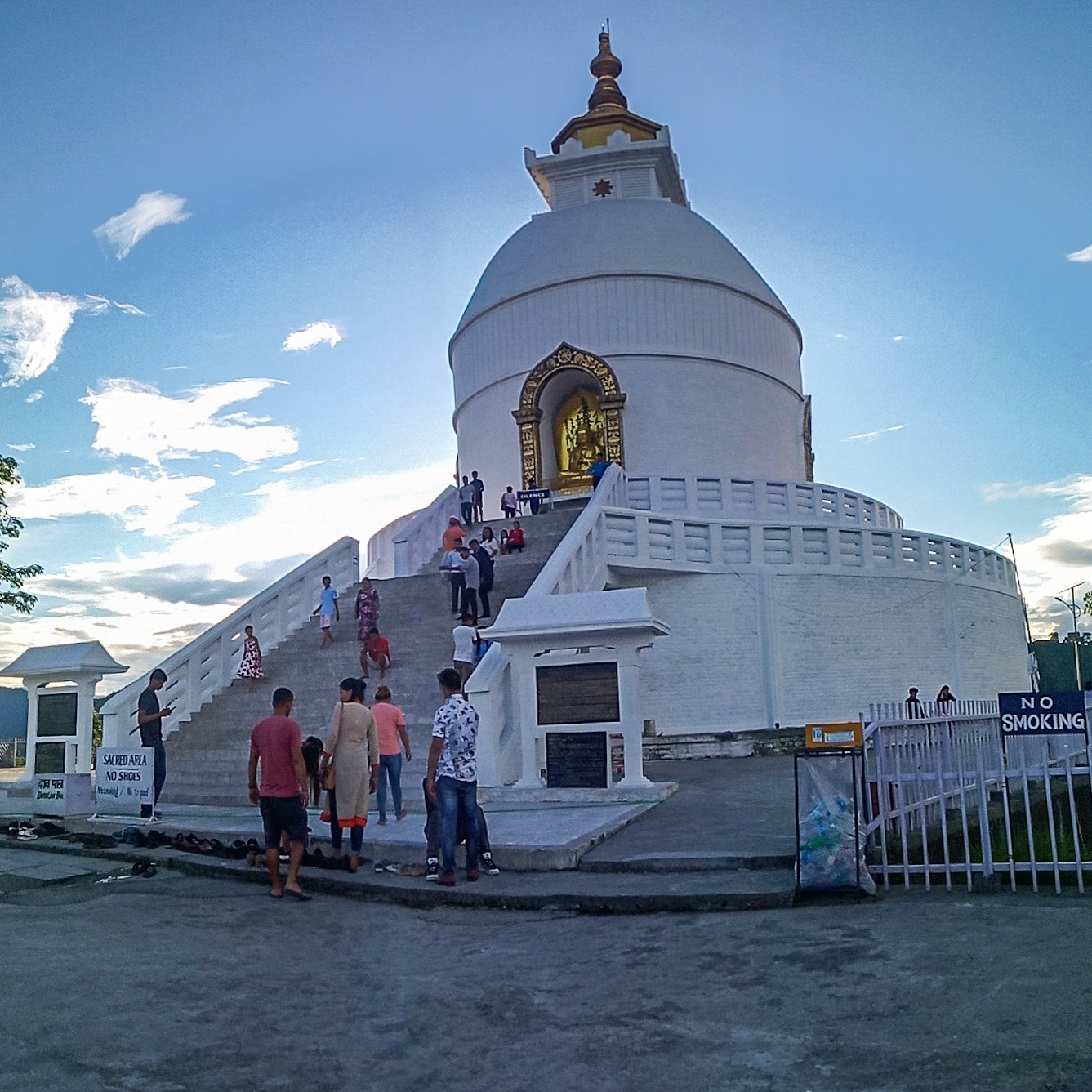
World Peace Pagoda / Shanti Stupa Pokhara

== Description and significance ==
Shanti Stupa in Pokhara is the first World Peace Pagoda in Nepal and seventy-first pagoda built by Nipponzan-Myōhōji in the world. The pagoda is 115 feet tall and 344 feet in diameter. The white pagoda has two tiers for tourists and religious visitors to circumambulate. The second tier displays four statues of the Buddha presented as a souvenirs from different countries: ‘Dharmacakra Mudra’ from Japan, ‘Bodh Gaya’ from Sri Lanka, ‘Kushinagar’ from Thailand and 'Lumbini' from Nepal. Each statue represents important events related to the Buddha and were named according to where they took place. Dharmachakra is placed below the gajur (pinnacle) which signifies the wheel of life, dharma and the teachings of the Buddha. The top of the golden gajur holds the crystal stone from Sri Lanka which symbolizes intellect and grace. Dhamma hall, with the Buddha statue, is located near the peace pagoda where Buddhist rituals take place daily and large pujas are performed on important dates according to the Lunar calendar, such as on full moon day.

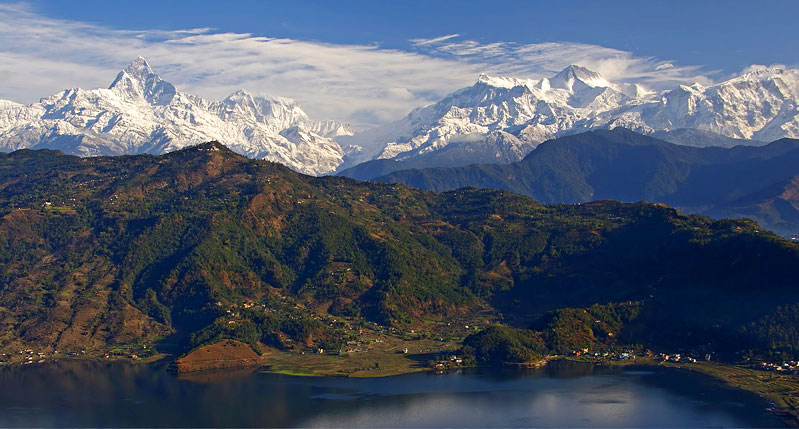
Fewa Lake and Himalayan Range seen from the Stupa

== Tourist attraction ==
Standing on top of the Anadu Hill, Shanti Stupa adds beauty to the Pokhara Valley. It is a perfect holiday place providing a clear view of the Himalayan range, Fewa Lake and Pokhara city. The hilltop provides a splendid view of sunrise and sunset. TripAdvisor has ranked Shanti Stupa as the second top attraction in Pokhara. The pagoda is 7 kilometers from Mahendrapool, the major business spot in Pokhara. There are several ways to reach the peace pagoda. There are hiking trails, cycling tracks and the blacked topped road to the Stupa. One popular and adventurous hiking trail is the crossing of Fewa Lake by a local boat and then climbing uphill through local villages which takes about an hour. The partial black-topped road from Chhorepatan to the Stupa takes about 25 minutes, which can be reached by taxi or private car. Public transportation too is available to the Stupa.

== In popular culture ==
The temple served as the start-line on the 9th Season (a Celebrity Edition) of The Amazing Race Australia.

== See also ==
- Peace Pagoda
- World Peace Pagoda, Lumbini
- Pokhara
- List of Stupas in Nepal
