= Kaathe Swyambhu =

Buddhist Stupa in Kathmandu, Nepal

Kaathe Swyambhu Shree Gha Chaitya
- काठे स्वयम्भु श्री घ: चैत्य
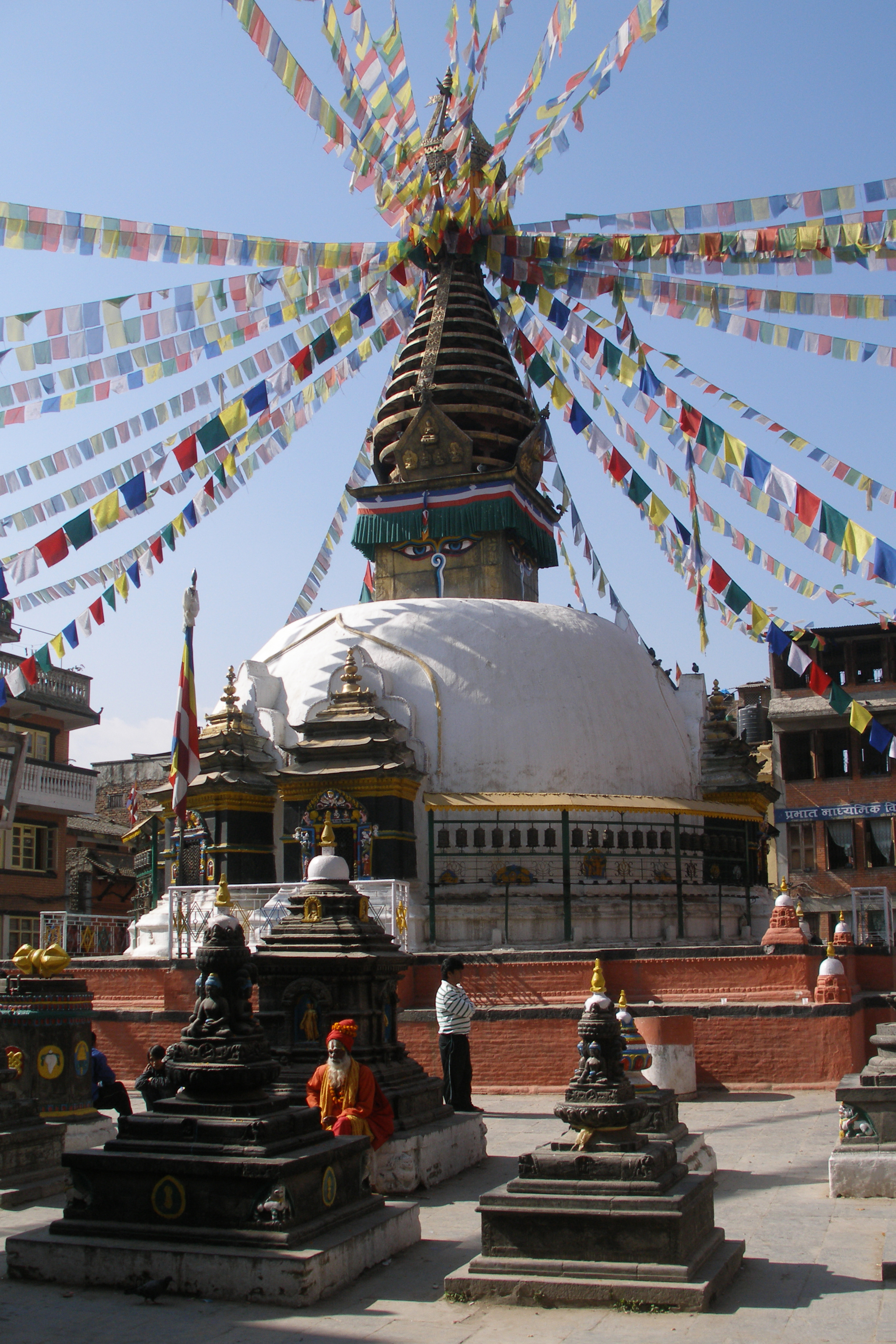

Location
- Location: Kathmandu
- Country: Nepal
- Interactive map of Kaathe Swyambhu Shree Gha Chaitya
- Coordinates: 27.709°N 85.309°E

Kaathe Swayambhu Shree Gha Chaitya (Nepali:काठे स्वयम्भु श्री घ: चैत्य) is a miniature replica of Swayambhunath. It was built around 1650AD and is one of the popular Buddhist pilgrimage site in Kathmandu, Nepal. The stupa is also called Shree Gha-Shanti Ghat Bhajradhatu Mahachaitya or Kathesimbhu stupa or Kashi Swayambhu.

The main stupa is surrounded by smaller chaityas inscriptions, statutes and an ancient cloister similar to Tibetan monastery. A statue of Avalokiteshvara lies before the stupa. The pilgrims who can't make a visit to the Swayambhunath Temple can equally benefit by visiting it. The 13 steps on the spire stood of the stupa signifies the 13 stages to reach Nirvana.

== Mythology ==
According to the legends, when Acharya Vak-vajra of Kwa-baha was on pilgrimage along the Ganges river was asked to consecrate a chaitya built by the king of Benaras. Vak-vajra sprinkled water from the Ganges over the monument. However, his power was not believed by the king. To show his power, Vak-vajra then sat in meditation, lifted the chaitya and transported it to its present location in Kathmandu. Another legend says, the stupa was constructed using the materials left after the construction of Swayambhunath stupa.

== History ==
The stupa is mentioned in an inscription of 1552AD (Nepal Sambat 762). It says that the golden pinnacle of the chaitya was donated by Megharaja in memory of his deceased son. He also established the guthi to perform annual commemoration. This guthi is closely related to the priests of nearby Kwa-baha. The stupa was repaired during the reign of king Pratap Malla (1624–74 AD). In 1647, the chaitya was de-consecrated, but restored by Vajracharya in 1653.

== Festival ==
A festival on the full moon of Asoj (September – October) is held mainly by the Shakyas of Ason near the stupa.

== See also ==
- List of Stupas in Nepal
