= Buddhist pilgrimage sites in Nepal =

Lumbini is the place where Queen Mayadevi gave birth to Siddhartha Gautama in 563 BCE. There are number of historical Buddhist pilgrimage sites in Nepal.

== Buddhist pilgrimage sites in Nepal ==
- Lumbini (There are over 60 excavation sites including Maya Devi Temple, World Peace Pagoda, Devdaha and Kudan Stupa / Nigrodharama), Kapilvastu District, Nepal
- Ramagrama stupa, Nawalparasi District of Nepal
- Koliya, Nawalparasi District of Nepal
- Swayambhunath, Kathmandu, Nepal
- Boudhanath, Kathmandu, Nepal
- Namo Buddha - Kavrepalanchok District (place where the Bodhisattva offered his body to a tigress.)
- Patan Durbar Square, Lalitpur, Nepal
- Halesi-Maratika Caves (venerated site of Buddhist & Hindu pilgrimage), Khotang, District in Nepal
