= World Peace Pagoda, Lumbini =

Buddhist pagoda in Lumbini, Nepal

World Peace Pagoda
- विश्व शान्ति स्तूपा
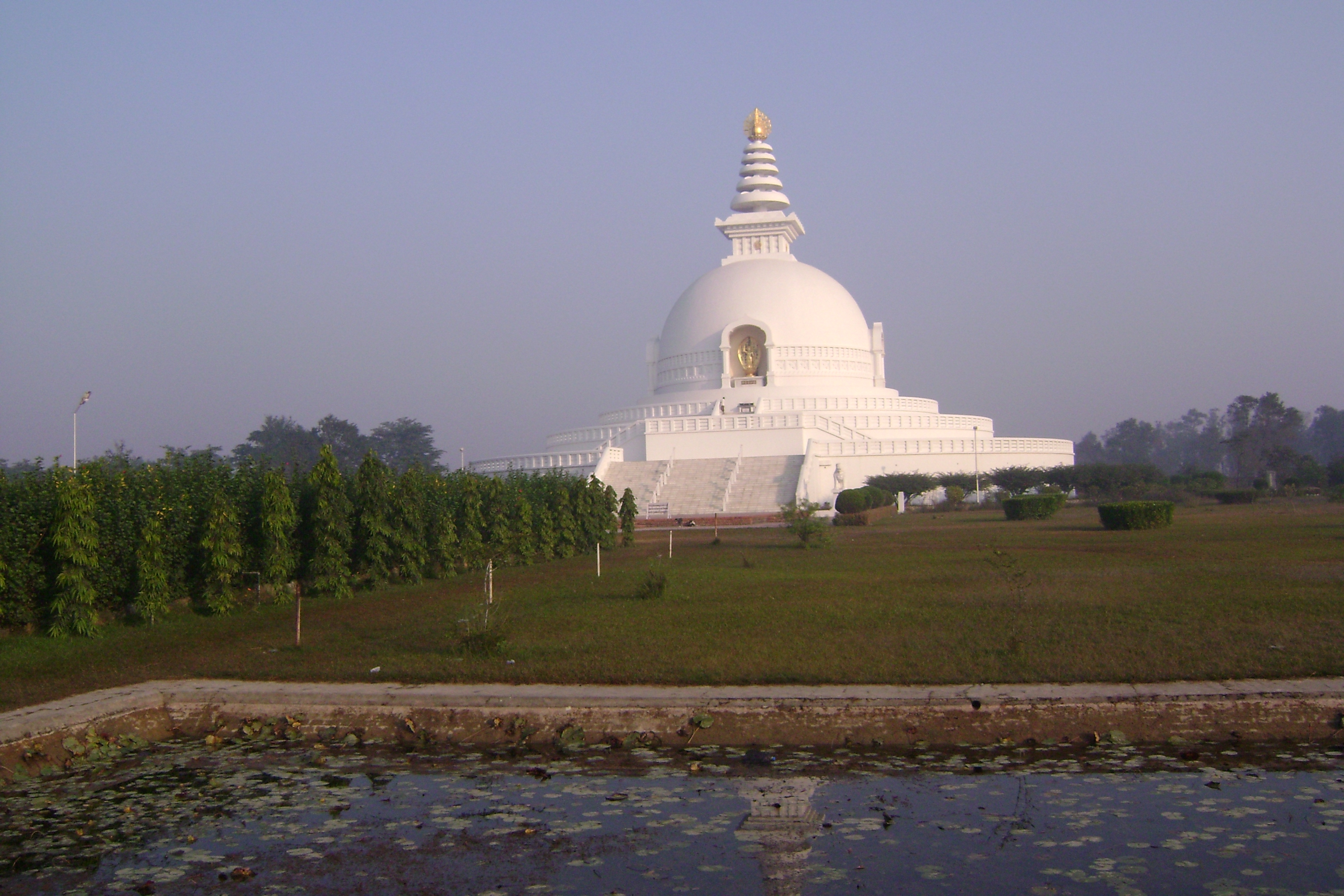

Religion
- Affiliation: Buddhism
- Deity: Buddha

Location
- Location: Lumbini
- Country: Nepal
- Interactive map of World Peace Pagoda
- Coordinates: 27.498°N 83.274°E

Architecture
- Type: Stupa

World Peace Pagoda (Nepali: विश्व शान्ति स्तूपा, Biswa Shanti Stupa), also called Nipponzan Peace Pagoda, is a Buddhist monument in Lumbini, Nepal. It was designed and built by Japanese Buddhists at a cost about a million US dollars. The Pagoda acts as the starting point on the central axis of the Lumbini Master Plan, the other end being the Mayadevi Temple. The distance from the pagoda to the temple is about 3.2 km. The stairs in stupa lead to three different levels. The stupa is whitewashed and the floor is stone-paved. It has four large golden statues of Buddha facing four directions.

Near the base of the stupa lies a grave of a Japanese monk (Unataka Navatame) who was shot nearby by robbers from India.

The area north of the stupa is also conserved for bird habitat mainly for the sarus crane.

== Gallery ==
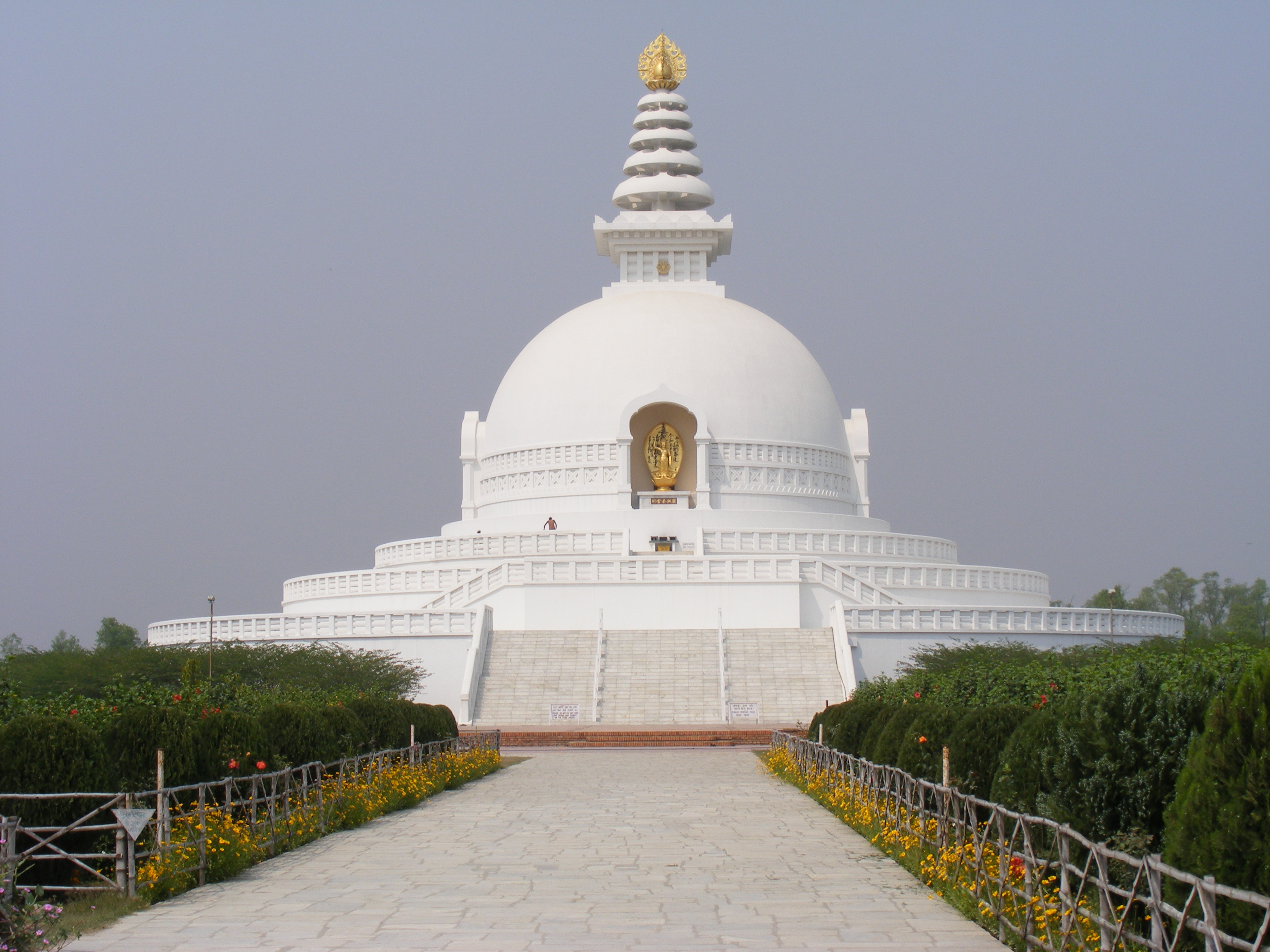
Front view

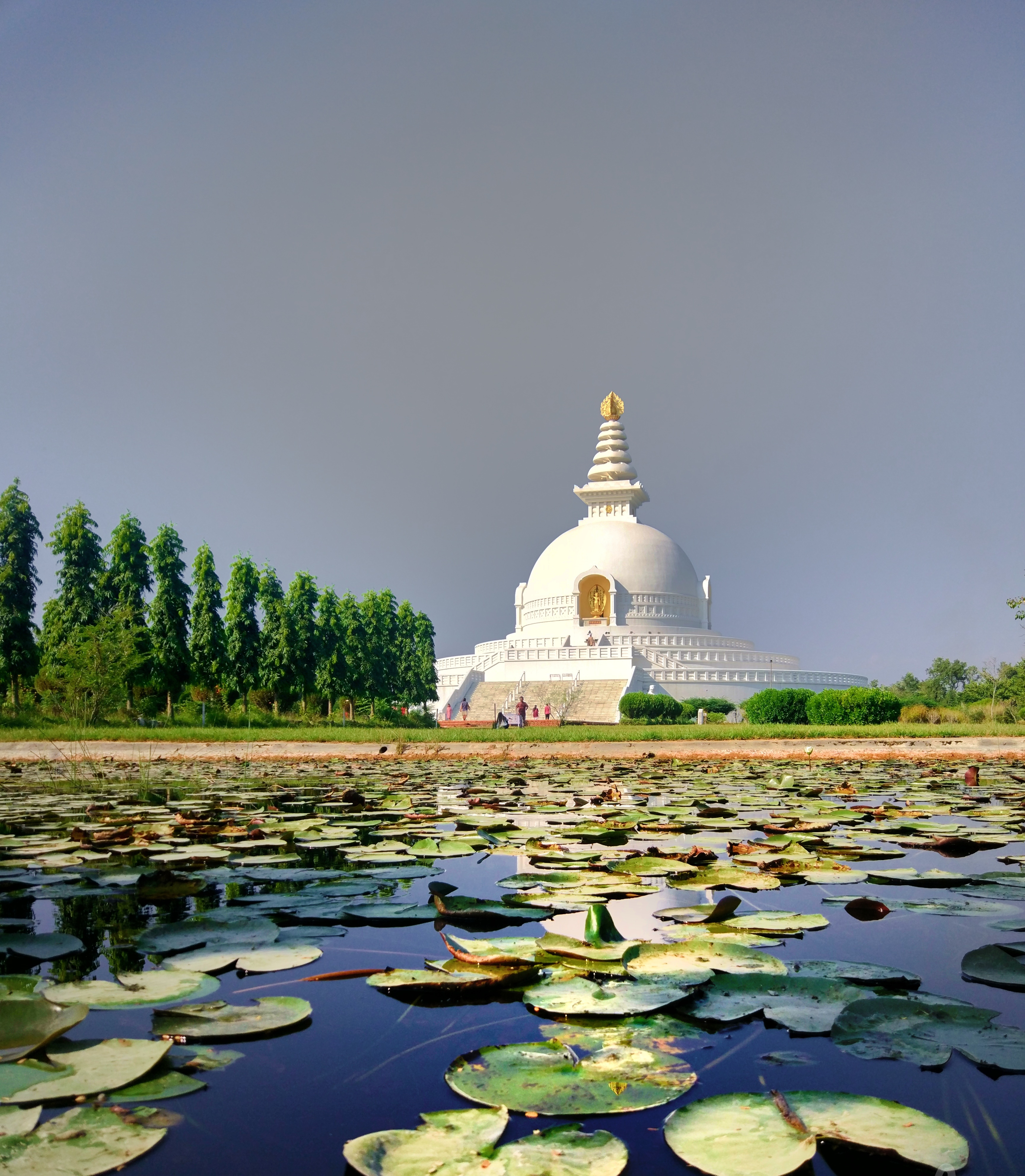
View of the garden

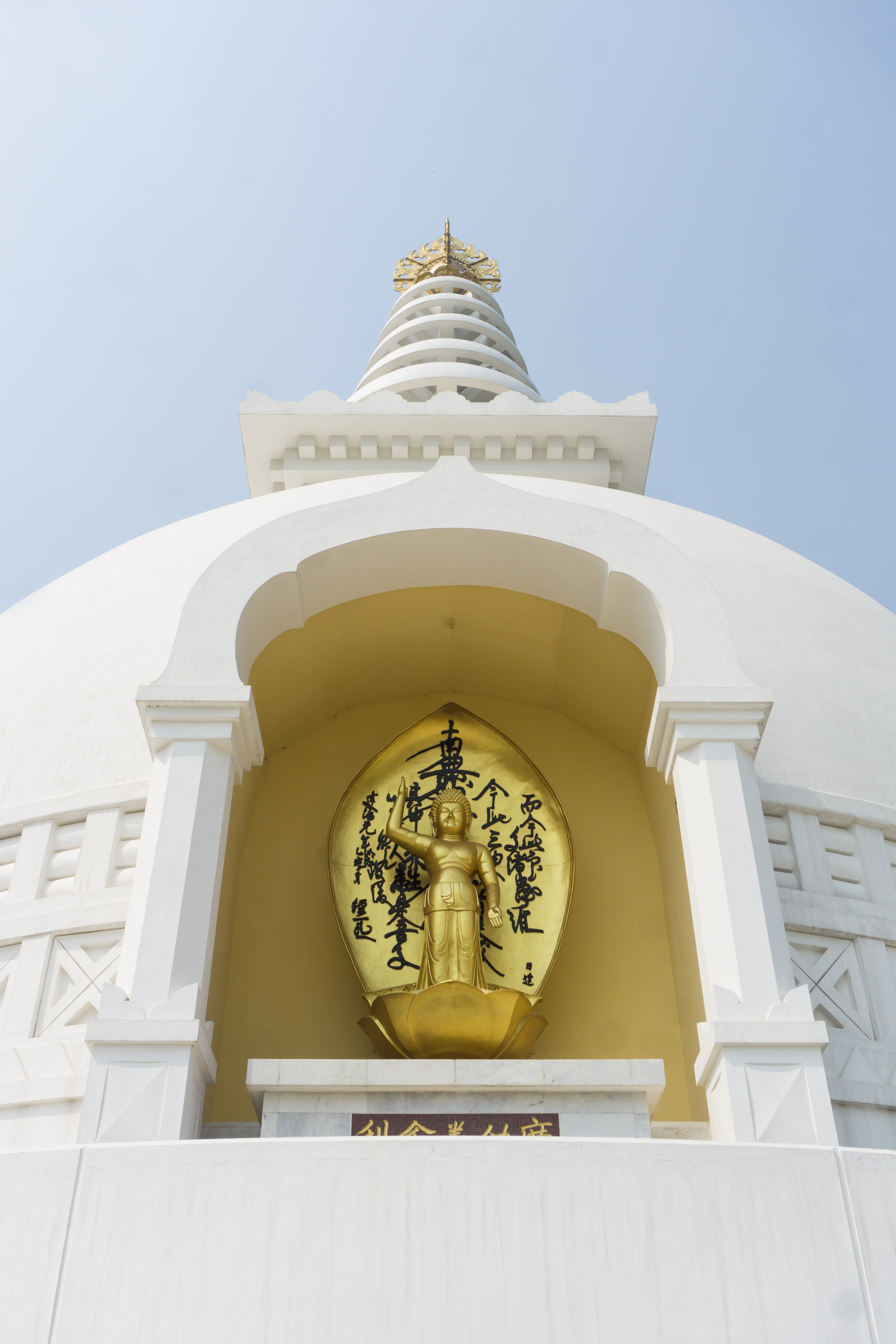
Golden buddha

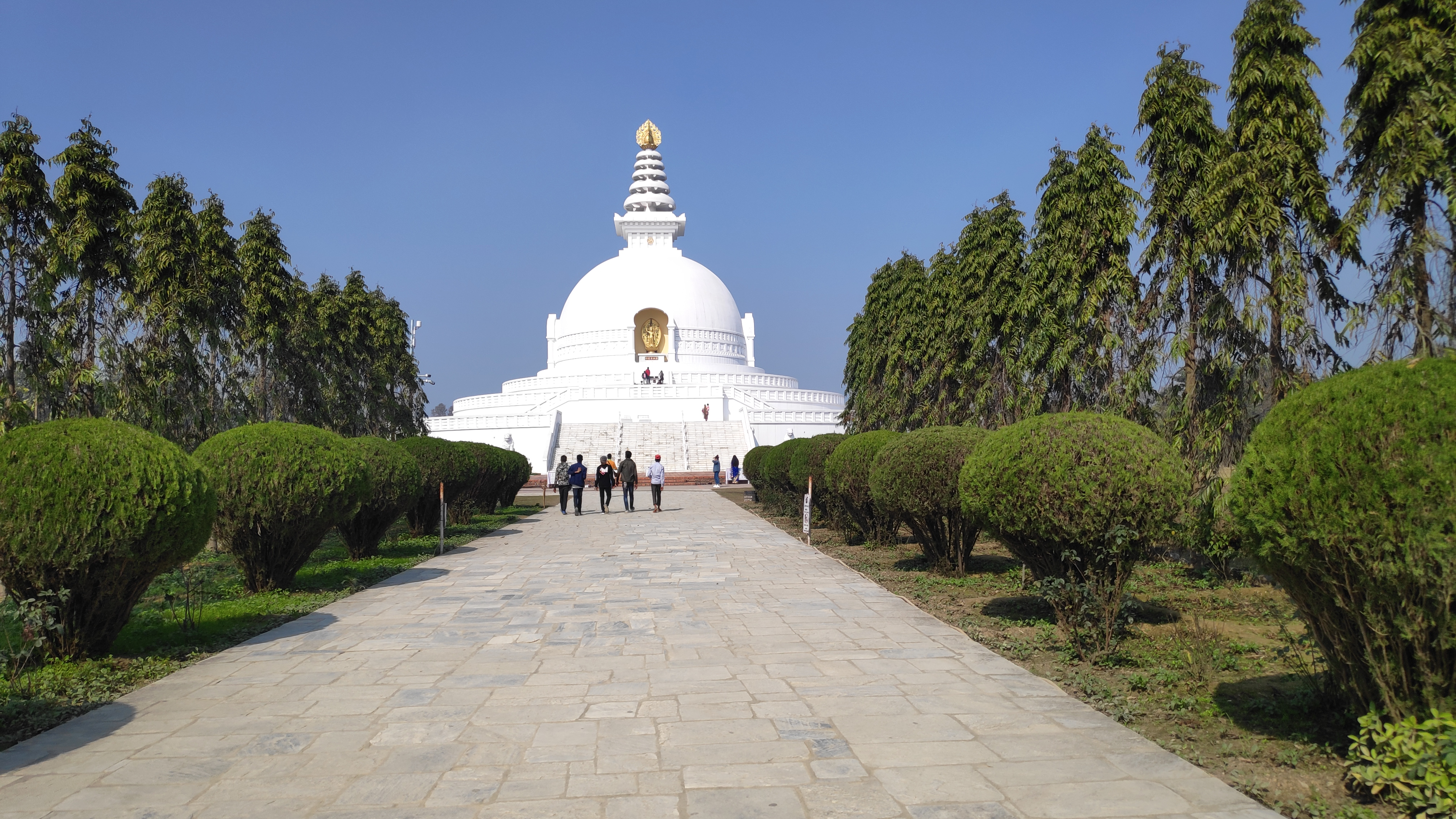
View from entrance

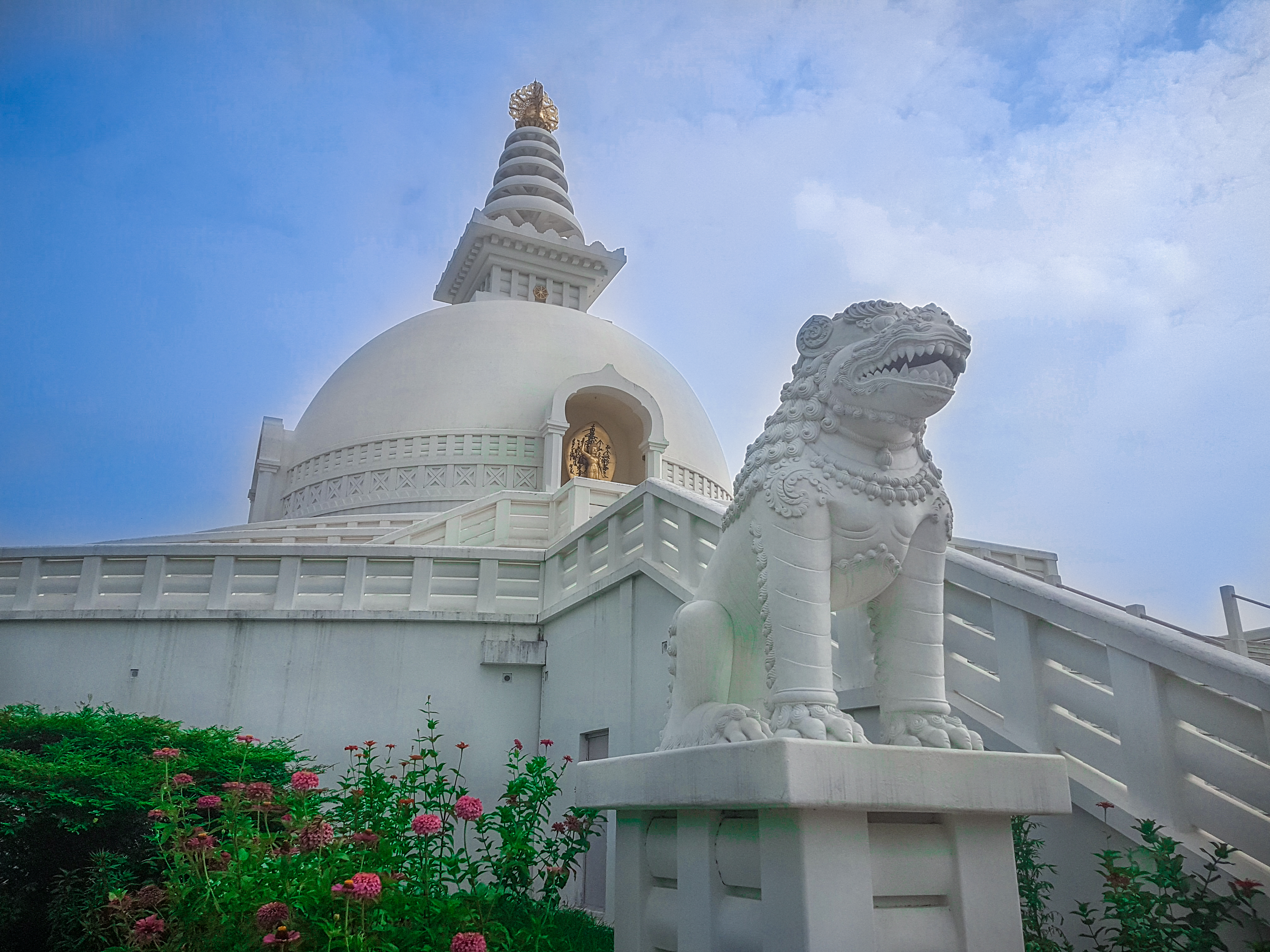
View from side

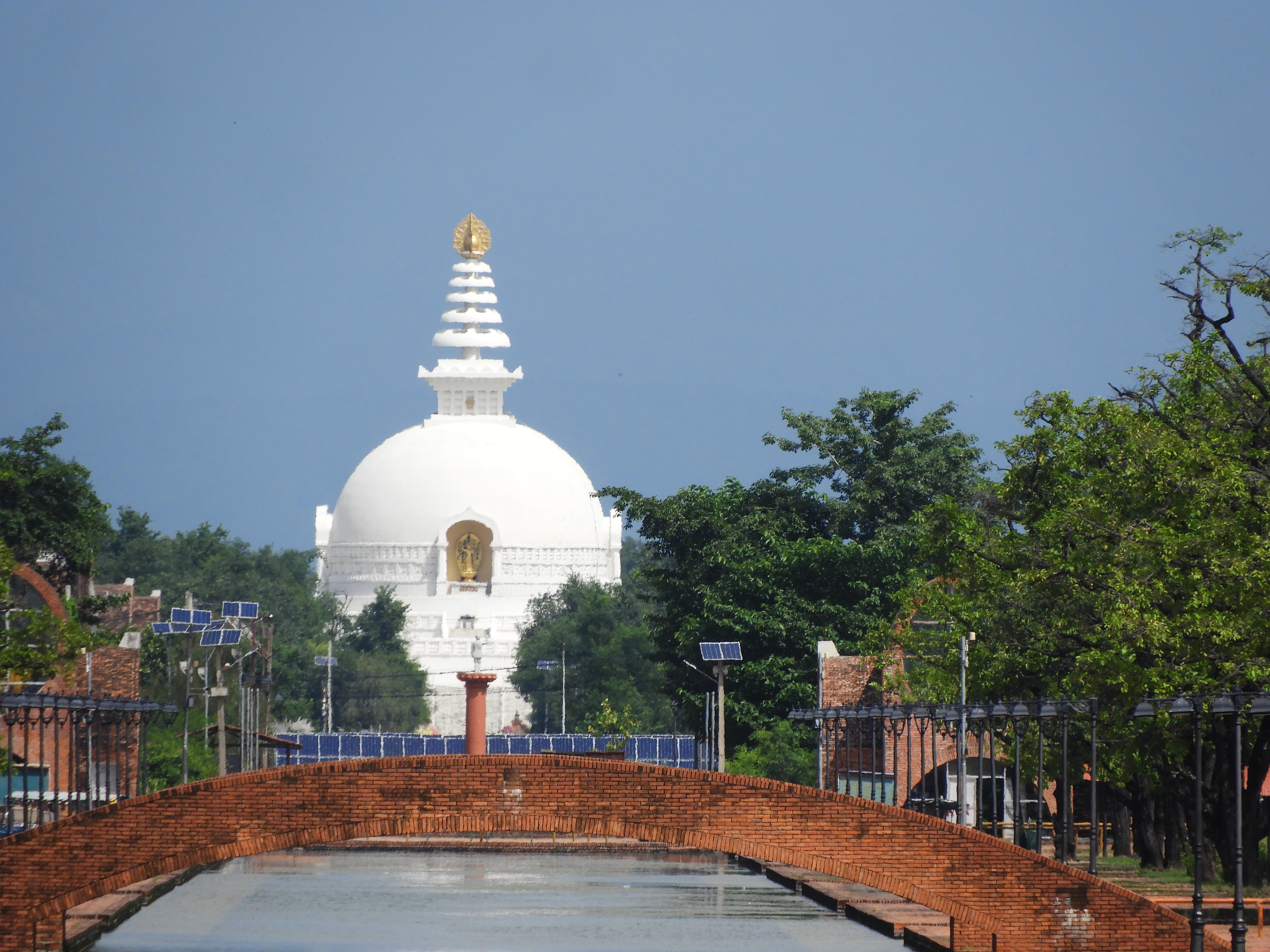
World Peace Pagoda

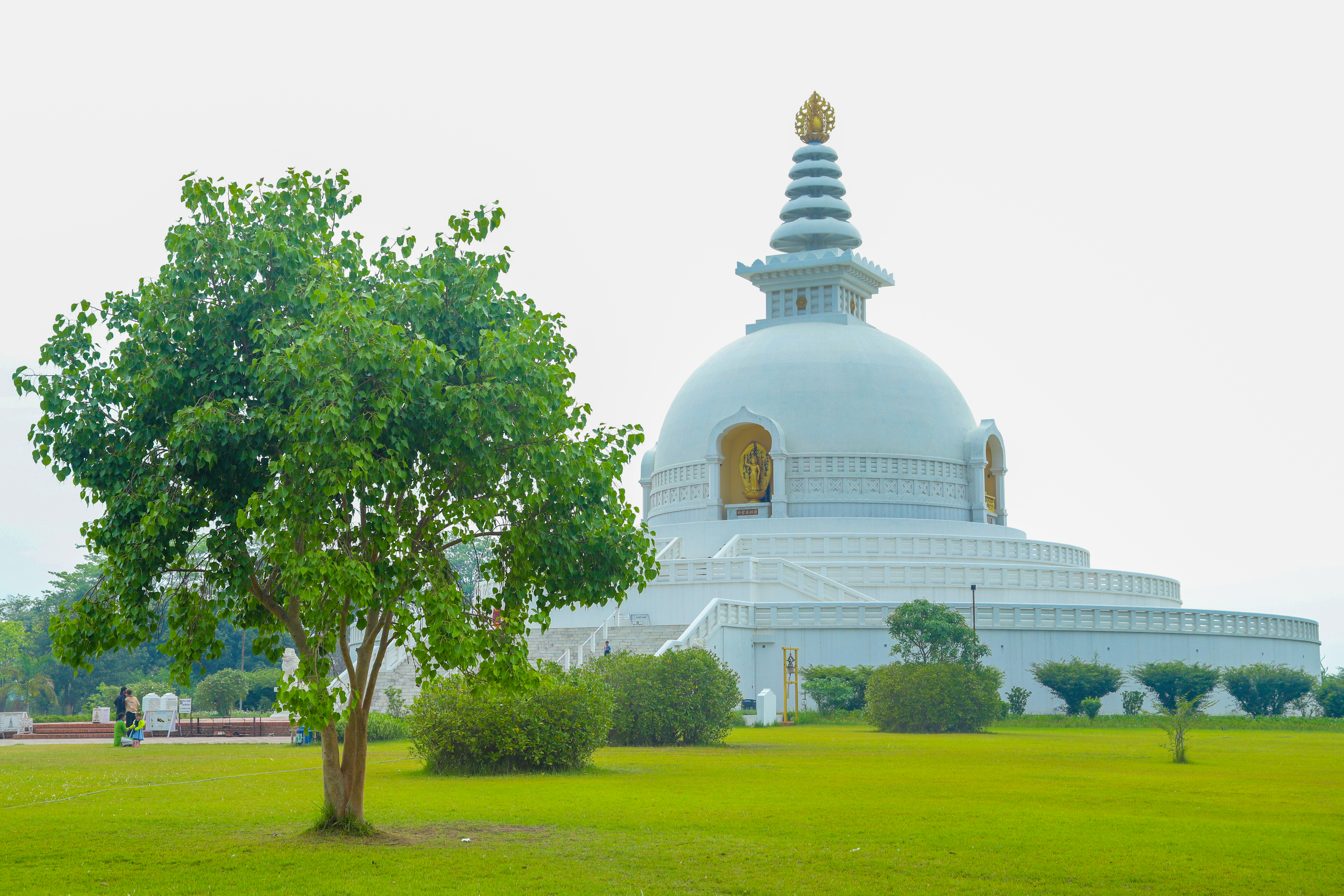
World Peace Pagoda

== See also ==
- Buddhism in Nepal
- Maya Devi Temple, Lumbini
- List of stupas in Nepal
