= Maya Devi Temple, Lumbini =

Ancient Buddhist temple at Lumbini, Nepal

Maya Devi Temple
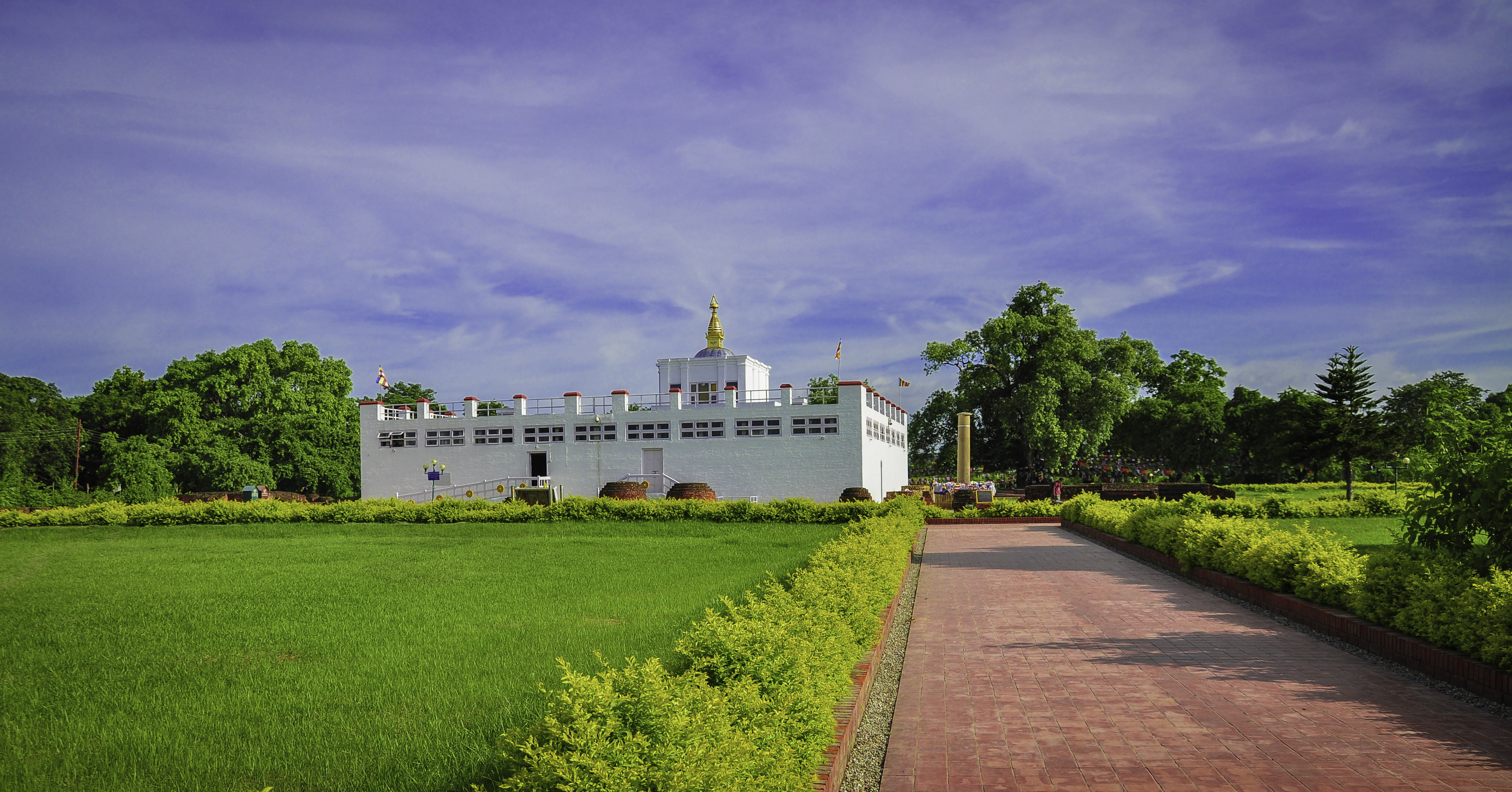
- Maya Devi Temple at Lumbini, Nepal

- Location within Nepal Maya Devi Temple, Lumbini (Nepal)

Religion
- Affiliation: Buddhism

Location
- Location: Lumbini
- Country: Nepal
- Interactive map of Maya Devi Temple
- Coordinates: 27.469634°N 83.275860°E

Architecture
- Completed: 3rd century BCE (Maya Devi Temple) ~550 BCE (earlier shrine beneath)

UNESCO World Heritage Site
- Location: Rupandehi District, Nepal
- Criteria: Cultural: iii, vi
- Reference: 666
- Inscription: 1997 (21st Session)
- Area: 198.95 ha (491.6 acres)
- Buffer zone: 22.78 ha (56.3 acres)

Maya Devi Temple is an ancient Buddhist temple situated at the UNESCO World Heritage Site of Lumbini, Nepal. It is the main temple at Lumbini, a site traditionally considered the birthplace of Gautama Buddha. The temple stands adjacent to a sacred pool (known as pushkarani) and a sacred garden. The archaeological remains at the site were previously dated to the third-century BCE brick buildings constructed by Ashoka. A sixth-century BCE timber shrine was discovered in 2013.

== Maya, Buddha's Mother ==
Maya was the princess of Koliya kingdom and the queen of Śuddhodana, king of Kapilavastu. According to Buddhist legends, Maya had a dream of a white elephant with a lotus on its trunk entering her right side during her pregnancy. The dream was interpreted as an arrival of a world ruler or a Buddha.

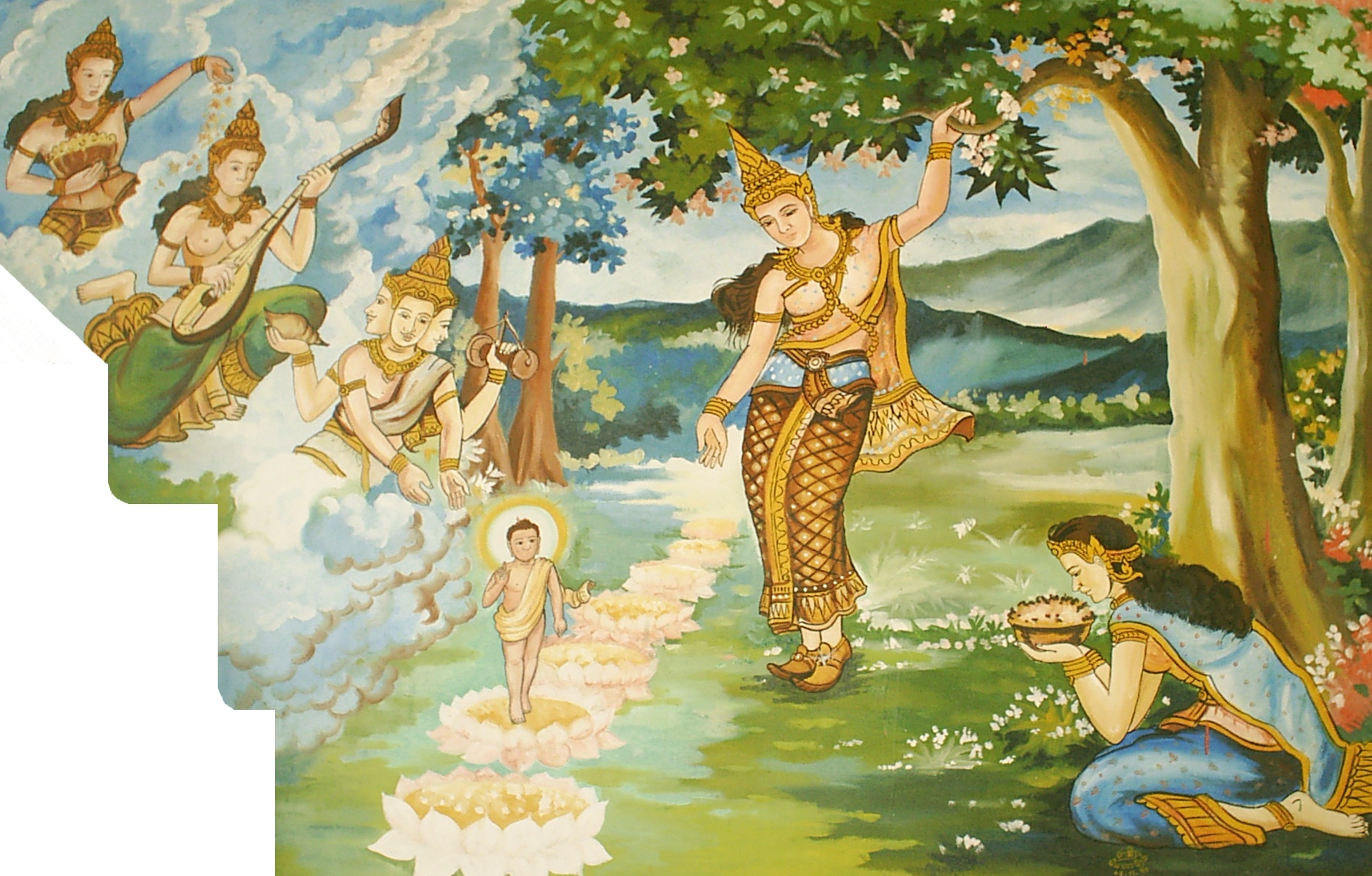
Gautama Buddha's birth in Lumbini and his mother Maya under the Sal tree

The Buddhist legends mention that Queen Mayadevi was on her way to her father's Koliya kingdom when she stopped near the garden of Lumbini to rest under a Sal tree and then went into labour, giving birth to Gautama Buddha. The Buddha was born in 623 BC in Lumbini which was later testified by emperor Ashoka with a Pāli inscription on a pillar, known as Ashoka pillar, marking his homage to the spot of Buddha's birth.

Seven days after the birth of Buddha, Maya died and was reborn in the Tuṣita heaven. Maya's sister and Buddha's foster-mother, Mahapajapati Gotami, later became the first woman to be ordained as a Buddhist nun by Gautama Buddha and is seen as an inspirational and instrumental figure in the creation of a female order within Buddhism.

== Temple Archaeology ==
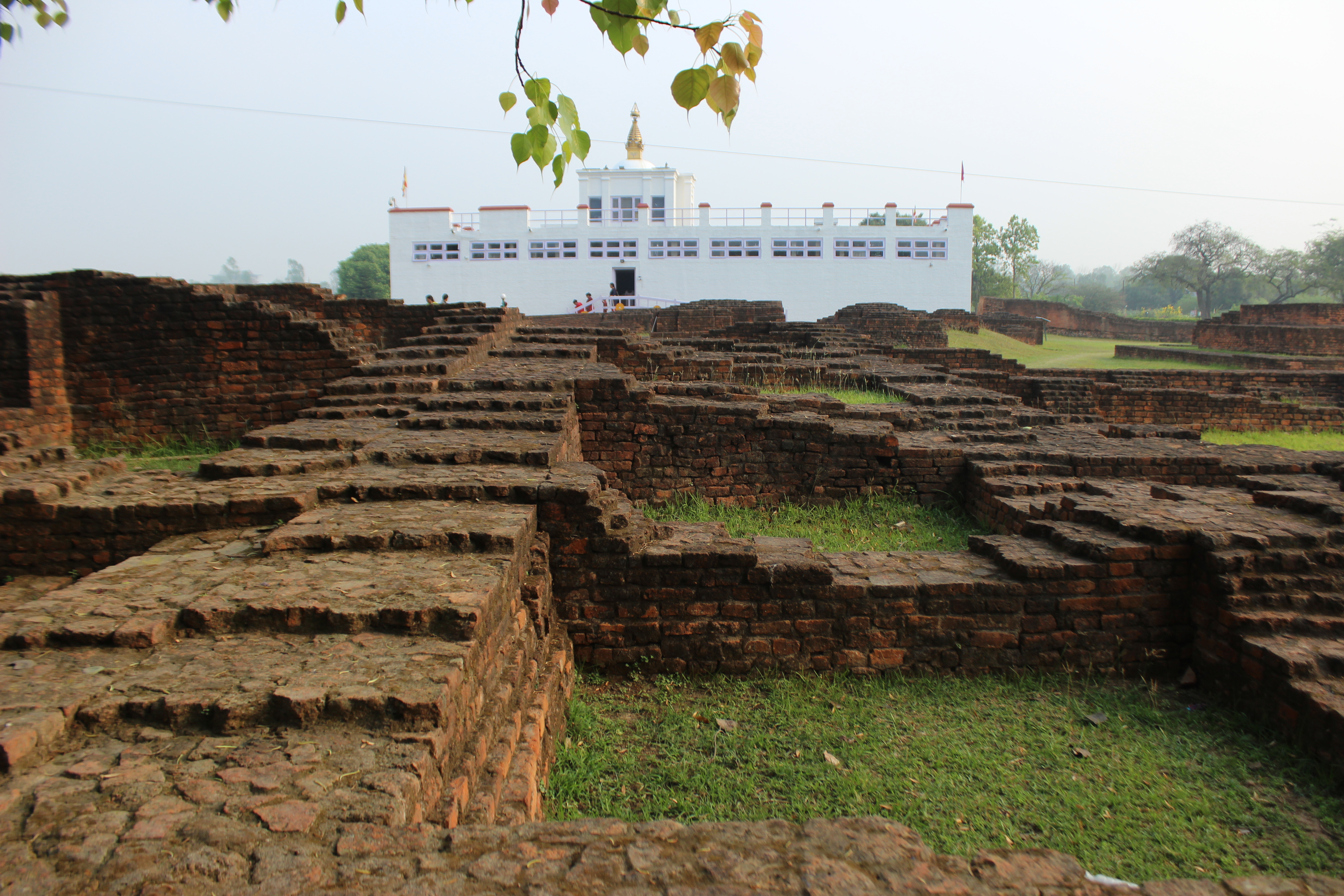
Maya Devi temple and ruins of ancient monasteries

Maya Devi temple houses the marker stone and the nativity sculpture related to the birth of Gautama Buddha. The ancient Maya Devi temple was built during the visit of emperor Ashoka in Lumbini around 249 BC using burnt bricks to safeguard the marker stone and nativity sculpture The radiocarbon dating of the posthole alignments from the surrounding soils have indicated that the sacred space was first delineated within the Maya Devi temple in the 6th century BCE.

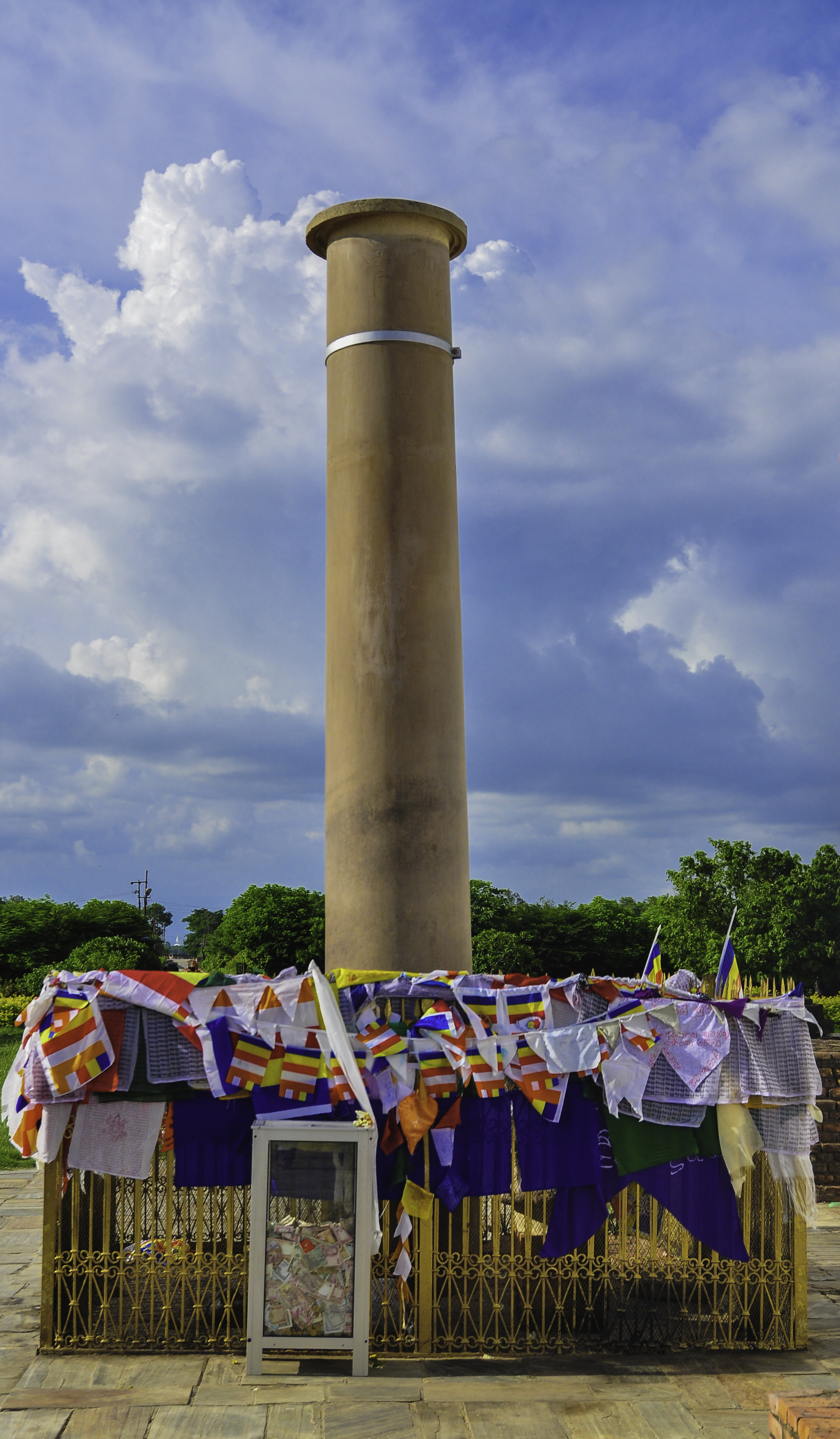
Ashoka pillar adjacent to the temple

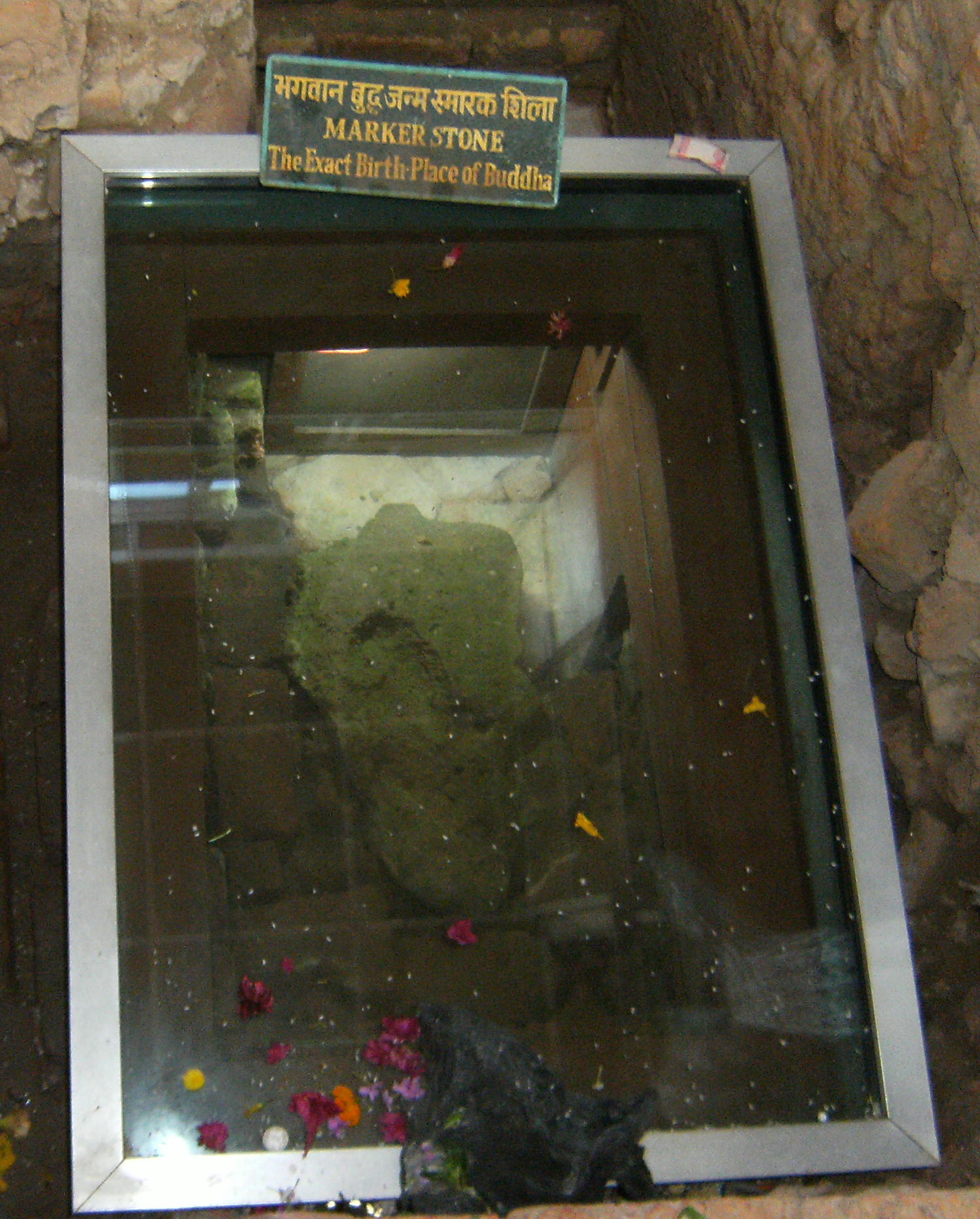
Marker stone of Gautama Buddha's birth in Maya Devi Temple

From 2010, an archeological team consisting of United Nations Educational, Scientific and Cultural Organization (UNESCO), Durham University, Nepal's Department of Archaeology, and the Lumbini Development Trust initiated excavation work at the Maya Devi temple supported by the Government of Japan. The excavations have identified that the earlier structures date back to the life period of Gautama Buddha in the 6th century BCE, and have gone through series of constructions and renovations over historical periods. The excavated shrines have been dated as the earliest Buddhist shrines in South Asia, and in addition, older remains of the village dating back to 1300 BC have been discovered a few hundred meters south of the temple.

The marker stone of the temple marks the location where the Buddha was born and the nativity sculpture showcases the birth scene of Gautama Buddha where queen Maya is depicted holding a branch of Sal tree during delivery, supported by her sister, Mahapajapati Gotami.

== Religious significance ==
At the age of 80, before the parinirvana of Gautama Buddha, he said to his disciples:

"There are, O monks, four places on earth which a believing householder's son or a believing householder's daughter should commemorate as long as they live. Which are those four? –here the Venerable One has been born –here the Venerable One has attained the unsurpassable complete enlightenment –here the Venerable One has turned the threefold-turning, twelve-spoked lawful wheel –here the Venerable One has gone to the realm of complete nirvāṇa." - Dīghanikāya, 16; Mahāparinibbāṇa Sutta

Lumbini is one of the four most sacred pilgrimage site along with Bodh Gaya, Sarnath and Kushinagar. Lumbini signifying the place where the Buddha was born, Bodh Gaya signifying the place where he attained Enlightenment, Sarnath signifying the place where he gave his first sermon and Kushinagar signifying the place where Gautama Buddha attained parinirvana; is a pilgrimage circuit in Buddhism as Buddha's Holy Sites.

== See also ==
- Maya (mother of the Buddha)
- Buddhist architecture
- History of Buddhism
- Timeline of Buddhism

== Gallery ==
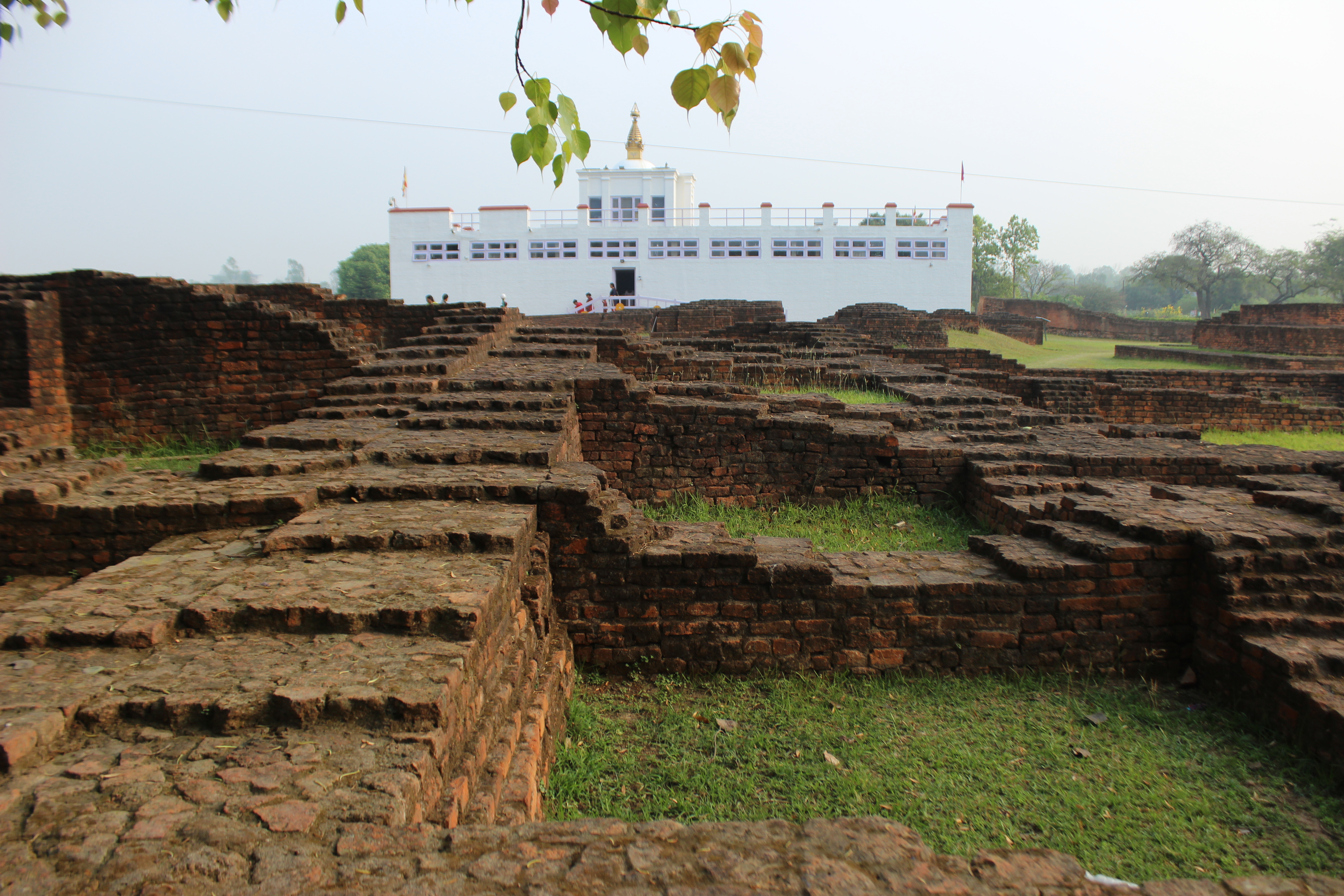
Mayadevi Temple and ruins of ancient monasteries in Lumbini

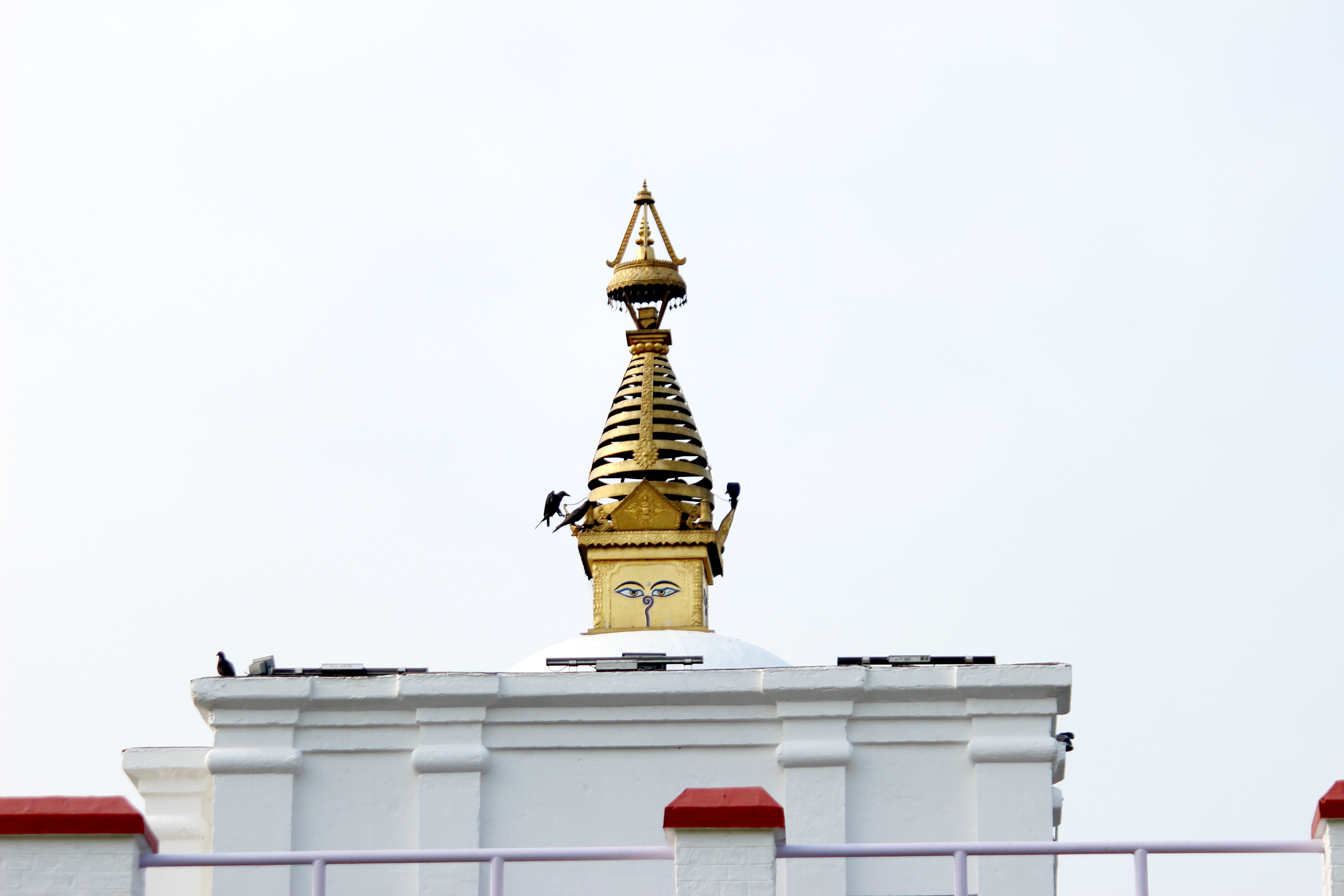
Close up view of the top of Mayadevi Temple.

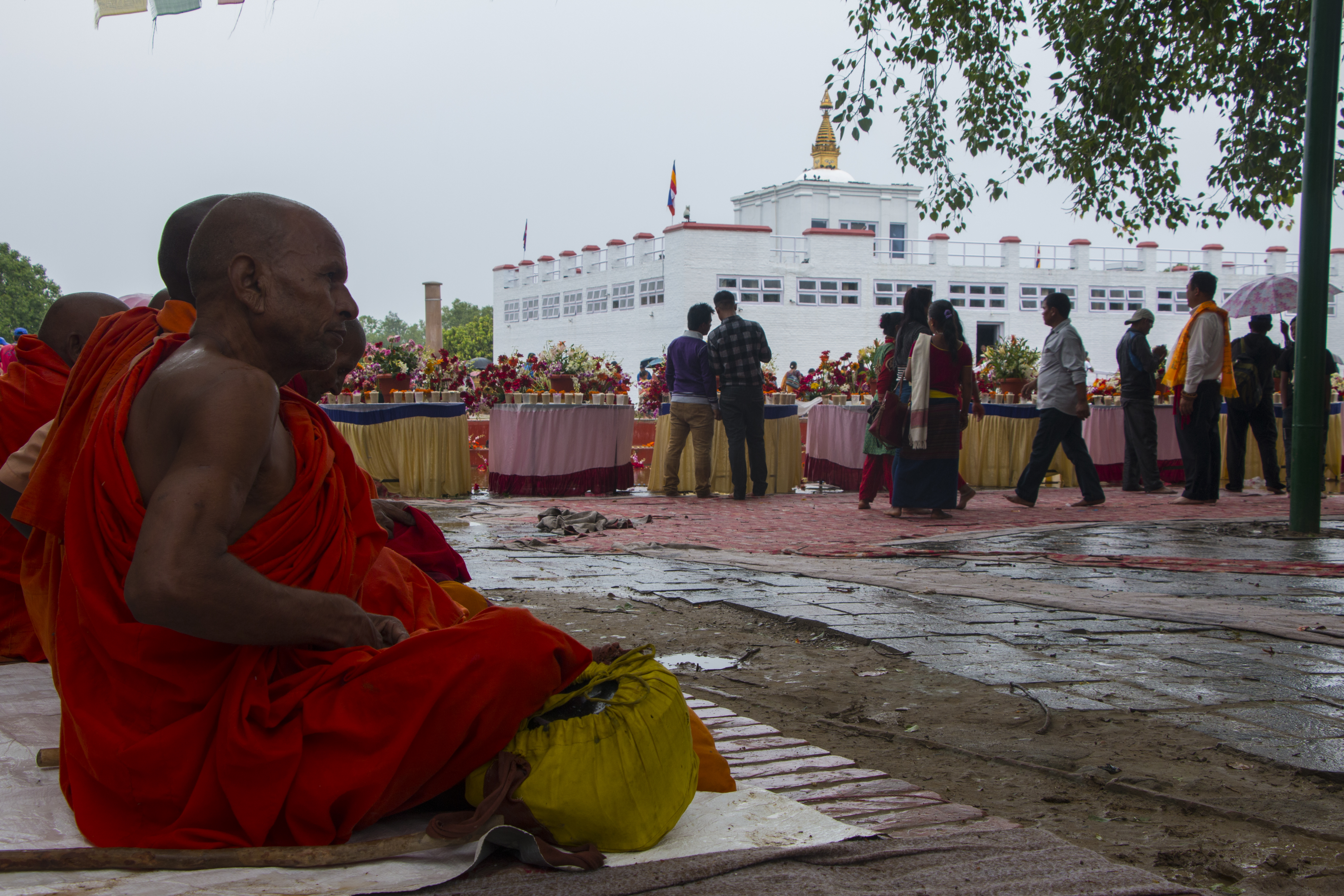

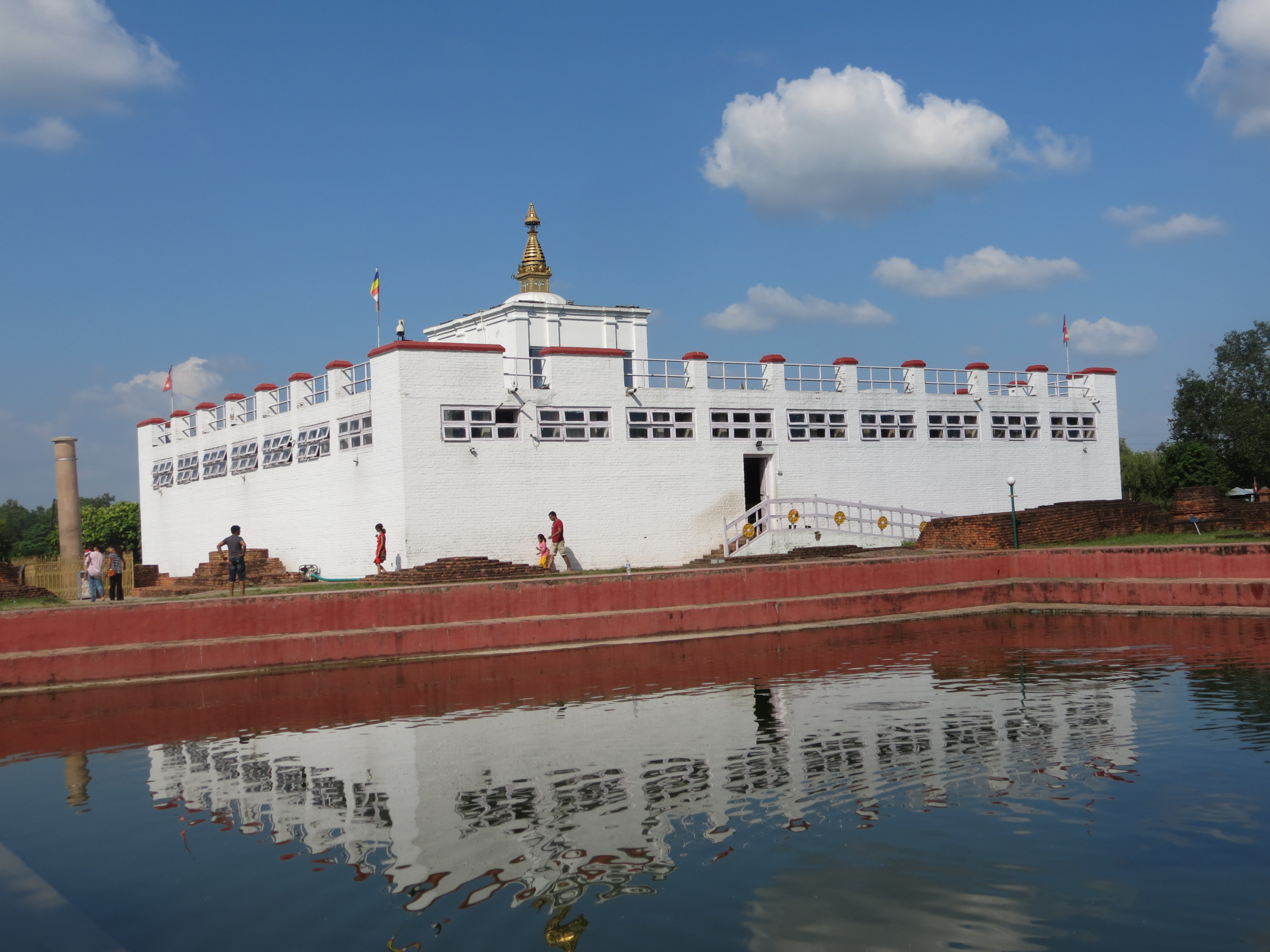

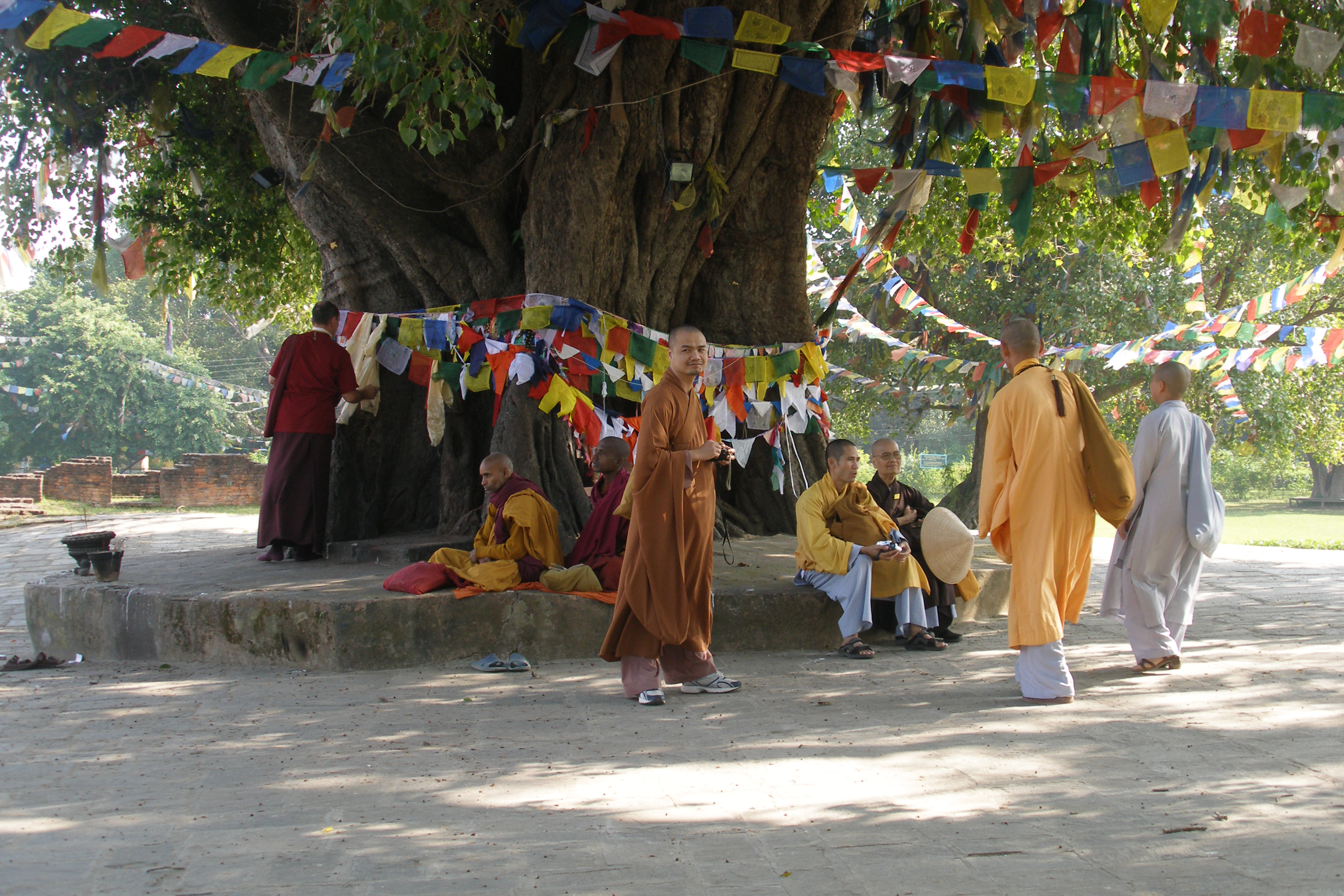
Bodhi Tree

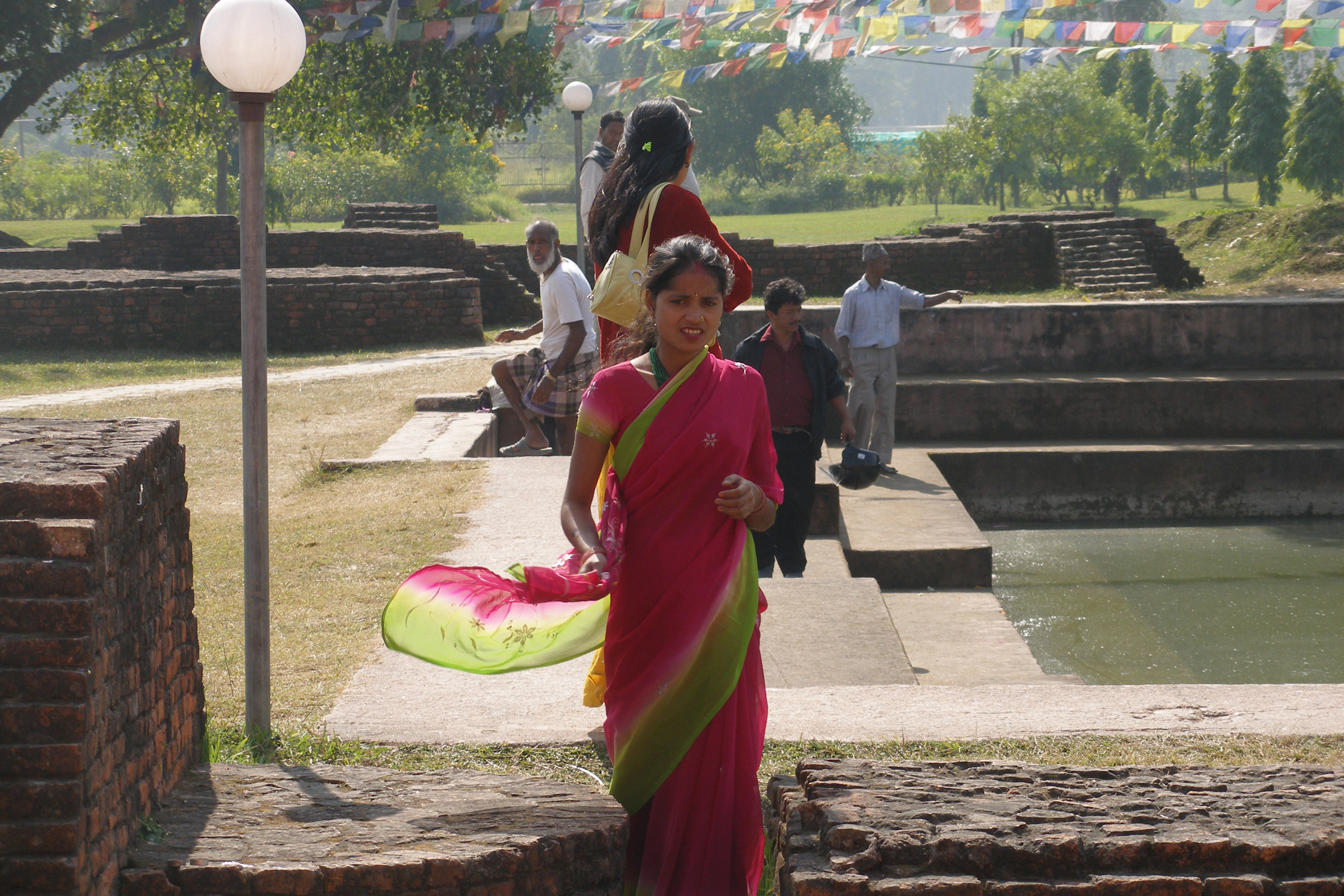

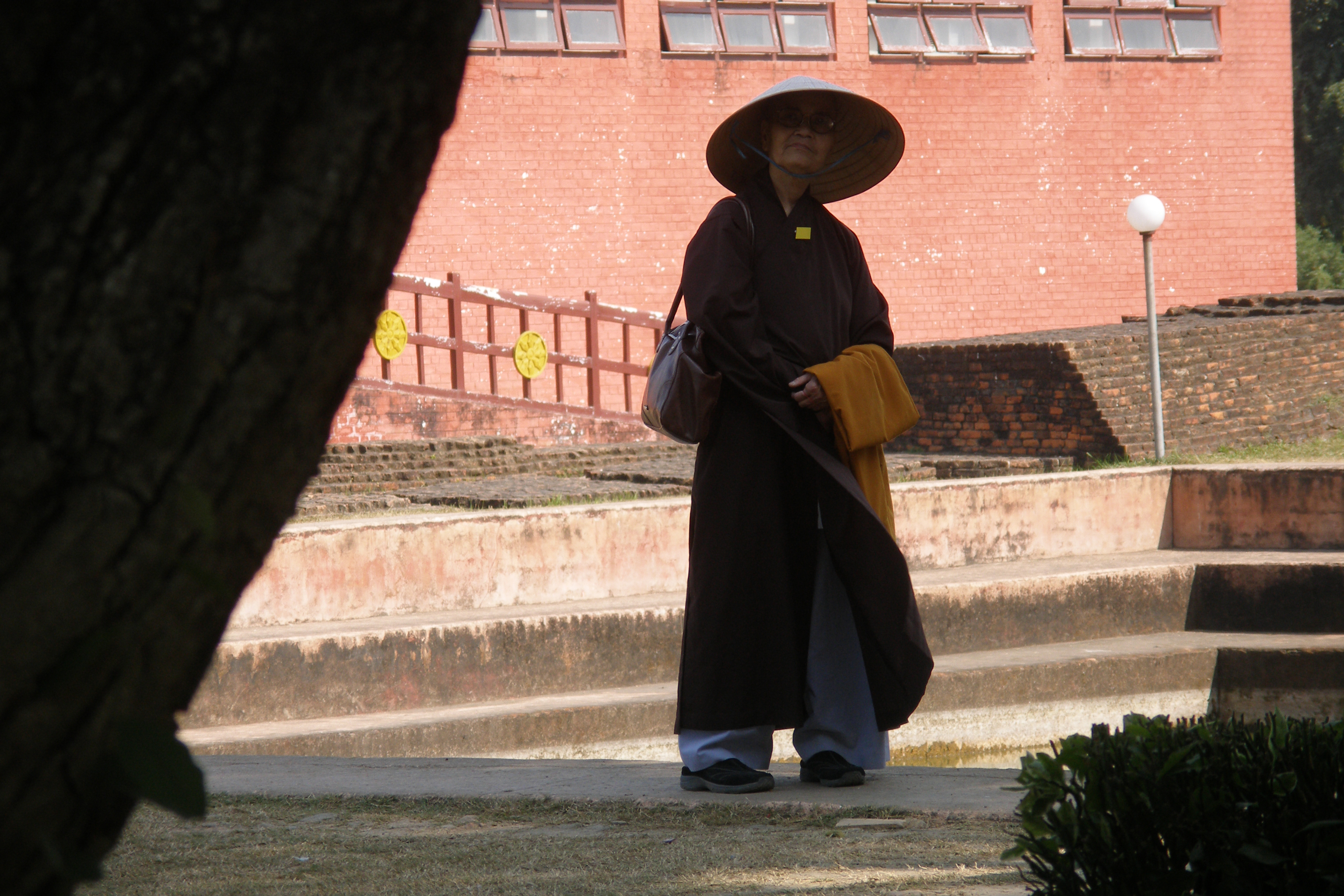
