= Nalanda mahavihara =

Buddhist monastery and centre of learning in India

Nalanda
- Nala, Nalaka, Nalakagrama, Nalendra
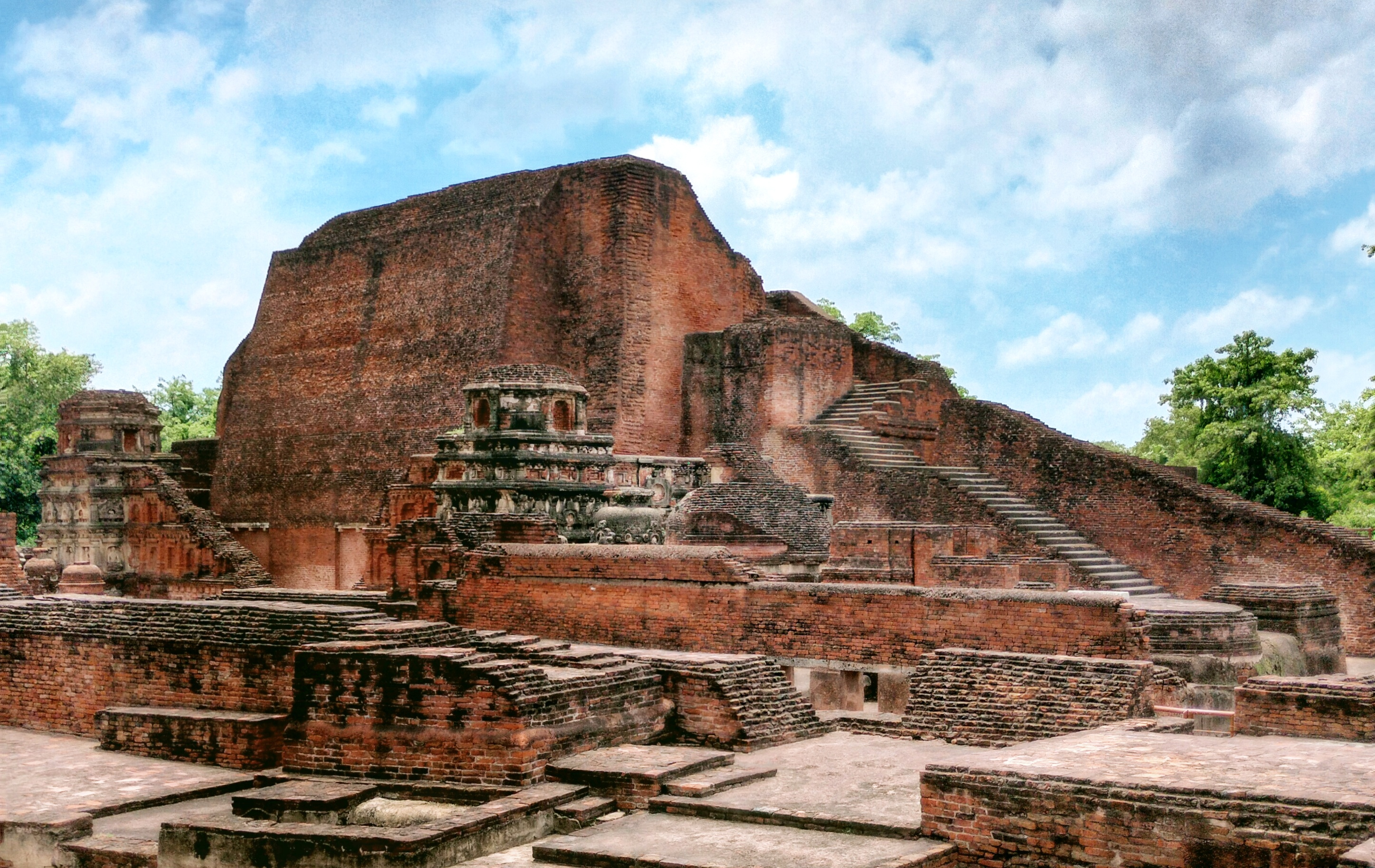
- Ruins at Nalanda Mahavihara
- Interactive map of Nalanda
- 25.13662°N 85.4426079°E
- Type: Mahavihara, monastery
- Location: Nalanda, Bihar, India
- Region: Magadha

History
- Built: 427 CE
- Built by: King Kumaragupta I
- Abandoned: Around 1400 CE
- Event(s): Likely attacked and ransacked by Muhammad Bakhtiyar Khalji in c. 1200 CE.

Site notes
- Length: 240 m (800 ft)
- Width: 490 m (1,600 ft)
- Area: 12 ha (30 acres)
- Excavation dates: 1915–1937, 1974–1982
- Archaeologists: David B. Spooner, Hiranand Sastri, Palak Shah, J. A. Page, M. Kuraishi, G. C. Chandra, N. Nazim, Amalananda Ghosh
- Condition: In ruins
- Owner: Government of India
- Management: Archaeological Survey of India
- Public access: Yes
- Website: ASI
- ASI No. N-BR-43

UNESCO World Heritage Site
- Official name: Archaeological Site of Nalanda Mahavihara at Nalanda, Bihar
- Criteria: Cultural: iv, vi
- Reference: 1502
- Inscription: 2016 (40th Session)
- Area: 23 ha (57 acres)
- Buffer zone: 57.88 ha (143.0 acres)

Nalanda (IAST: Nālandā, pronounced [naːlən̪d̪aː]) was a renowned Buddhist mahavihara (great monastery) in medieval Magadha (modern-day Bihar), eastern India. Widely considered to be among the greatest centres of learning in the ancient world and often referred to as "the world's first residential university", it was located near the city of Rajagriha (now Rajgir), roughly 90 kilometres (56 mi) southeast of Pataliputra (now Patna). Operating for almost a thousand years from 427 CE until around 1400 CE, Nalanda mahavihara played a vital role in promoting the patronage of arts, culture and academics during the 5th and 6th century CE, a period that has since been described as the "Golden Age of India" by scholars. The characterisation of Nalanda as a "university" in the modern sense has been challenged by scholars. They argue that while it was undoubtedly a major centre of learning, comparing it directly to a modern university is historically imprecise.

Nalanda was established by emperor Kumaragupta I of the Gupta Empire around 427 CE, and was supported by numerous Indian and Javanese patrons – both Buddhists and non-Buddhists. Nalanda continued to thrive with the support of the rulers of the Pushyabhuti dynasty (r. 500–647 CE) and the Pala Empire (r. 750–1161 CE). After the fall of the Palas, the monks of Nalanda were patronised by the Pithipatis of Magadha. Nalanda was attacked by Huns under Mihirakula in the 5th century and again sustained severe damage from an invasion by the Gauda king of Bengal in the 8th Century. During the final invasion it was burnt down by Muhammad Bakhtiyar Khalji (c. 1200), but it managed to remain operational for decades (or possibly even centuries) following his raids.

Over some 750 years, Nalanda's faculty included some of the most revered scholars of Mahayana Buddhism. The historian William Dalrymple said of Nalanda that "at its apex, it was the undisputed scholarly centre of the Mahayana Buddhist world". The faculty and students associated with the monastery included Dharmapala, Nagarjuna, Dharmakirti, Asanga, Vasubandhu, Chandrakirti, Xuanzang, Śīlabhadra, Vajrabodhi, and Dharmasvamin. The curriculum of Nalanda included major Buddhist philosophies like Madhyamaka, Yogachara and Sarvastivada, as well as subjects like the Vedas, grammar, medicine, logic, mathematics, astronomy and alchemy. The mahavihara had a renowned library that was a key source for the Sanskrit texts that were transmitted to East Asia by pilgrims like Xuanzang and Yijing. Many texts composed at Nalanda played an important role in the development of Mahayana and Vajrayana. They include the works of Dharmakirti, the Sanskrit text Bodhisattvacaryāvatāra of Shantideva, and the Mahavairocana Tantra.

The ancient site of Nalanda is a UNESCO World Heritage Site. In 2010, the Government of India passed a resolution to revive the ancient university, and a contemporary institute, Nālandā University, was established at Rajgir. It has been listed as an Institute of National Importance by the Government of India.

== Location ==
Nalanda is about 16 kilometres (10 mi) north of the city of Rajgir and about 90 kilometres (56 mi) southeast of Patna, connected via NH 31, 20 and 120 to India's highway network. It is about 80 kilometres (50 mi) northeast of Bodh Gaya – another important Buddhist site in Bihar. The Nalanda archaeological site is spread over a large area to the northwest of Bargaon (Nalanda) village, and is between the historical manmade lakes Gidhi, Panashokar and Indrapuskarani. On the south bank of the Indrapushkarani lake is the Nava Nalanda Mahavihara – a university founded in its memory. Similarly on the south west bank of the Indrapushkarani lake is Nalanda Open University, the state university named after the ancient Nalanda University.

== Etymology ==
Mahavihara (Mahāvihāra) is the Sanskrit and Pali term for a great vihāra (centre of learning or Buddhist monastery) and is used to describe a monastic complex of viharas.

According to the early 7th-century Tang dynasty Chinese pilgrim, Xuanzang, the local tradition explains that the name Nālandā (Hindi/Magahi: नालन्दा) came from a nāga (serpent deity in Indian religions) whose name was Nalanda. He offers an alternate meaning "charity without intermission", from "na-alam-da"; however, this split does not mean this. Hiranand Sastri, an archaeologist who headed the excavation of the ruins, attributes the name to the abundance of nālas (lotus-stalks) in the area and believes that Nalanda would then represent the giver of lotus-stalks.

In some Tibetan sources, including the 17th-century work of Taranatha, Nalanda is referred to as Nalendra, and is likely synonymous with Nala, Nalaka, Nalakagrama found in Tibetan literature.

== History ==
=== Early history of the city of Nalanda (1200 BCE–300 CE) ===
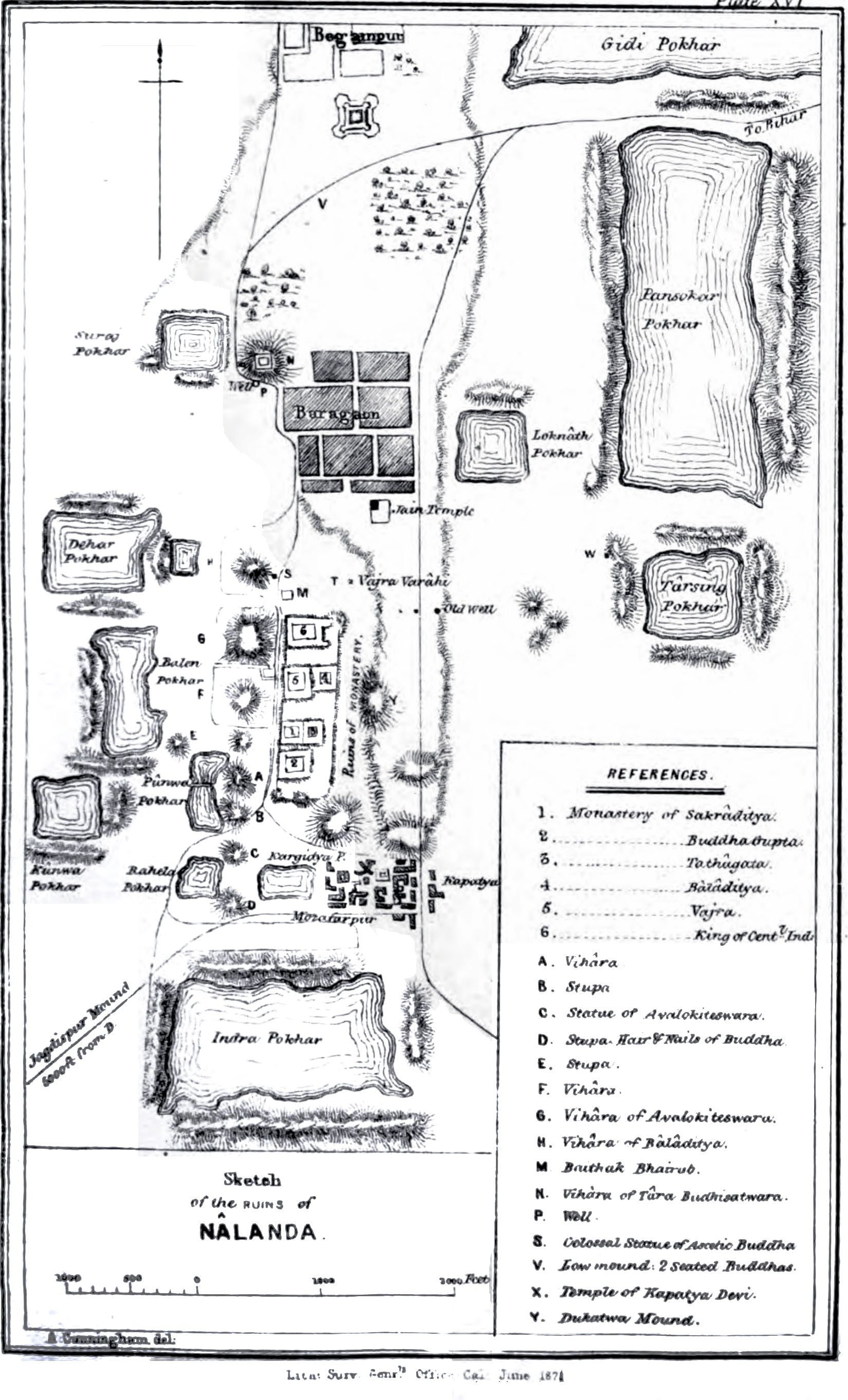
A map of Nalanda and its environs from Alexander Cunningham's 1861–62 ASI report which shows a number of ponds (pokhar) around the Mahavihara.

Archaeological excavations at sites near Nalanda, such as the Juafardih site about three kilometres away, have yielded black ware and other items. These have been carbon dated to about 1200 BCE. This suggests that the region around Nalanda in Magadha had a human settlement centuries before the birth of the Mahavira and the Buddha.

Early Buddhist texts state that Buddha visited a town near Rajagriha (modern Rajgir – the capital of Magadha) called Nalanda on his peregrinations. He delivered lectures in a nearby mango grove named Pavarika and one of his two chief disciples, Shariputra, was born in the area and later attained nirvana there. These Buddhist texts were written down centuries after the death of the Buddha, are not consistent in either the name or the relative locations. For example, texts such as the Mahasudassana Jataka states that Nalaka or Nalakagrama is about a yojana (10 miles) from Rajagriha, while texts such as Mahavastu call the place Nalanda-gramaka and place it half a yojana away. A Buddhist text Nikayasamgraha does state that emperor Ashoka established a vihara (monastery) at Nalanda. However, archaeological excavations so far have not yielded any monuments from Ashoka period or from another 600 years after his death.

Chapter 2.7 of the Jaina text Sutrakritanga states that Nalanda is a "suburb" of capital Rajagriha, has numerous buildings, and this is where Mahavira (6th/5th century BCE) spent fourteen varshas – a term that refers to a traditional retreat during monsoons for the monks in Indian religions. This is corroborated in the Kalpasutra, another cherished text in Jainism. However, other than the mention of Nalanda, Jaina texts do not provide further details, nor were they written down for nearly a millennium after Mahavira's death. Like the Buddhist texts, this has raised questions about reliability and whether the current Nalanda is same as the one in Jaina texts. According to Scharfe, though the Buddhist and Jaina texts generate problems with place identification, it is "virtually certain" that the modern Nalanda is near or the site these texts are referring to.

Sariputta, a prominent disciple of the Buddha, was born and died in Nalanda. King Ashoka is said to have built the Sariputta stupa in Nalanda to honour him, and Sariputta's relics were also enshrined in stupas at Sanchi and Mathura.

==== Faxian visit (399–412 CE) ====
When Faxian, a Chinese Buddhist pilgrim monk, visited the city of Nalanda, there probably was no university yet. Faxian had come to India to acquire Buddhist texts, and spent 10 years in India in the early fifth century, visiting major Buddhist pilgrimage sites including the Nalanda area. He also wrote a travelogue, which inspired other Chinese and Korean Buddhists to visit India over the centuries; in it he mentions many Buddhist monasteries and monuments across India. However, he makes no mention of any monastery or university at Nalanda even though he was looking for Sanskrit texts and took a large number of them from other parts of India back to China. Combined with a lack of any archaeological discoveries of pre-400 CE monuments in Nalanda, the silence in Faxian's memoir suggests that Nalanda monastery-university did not exist around 400 CE.

=== Foundation (5th century) ===
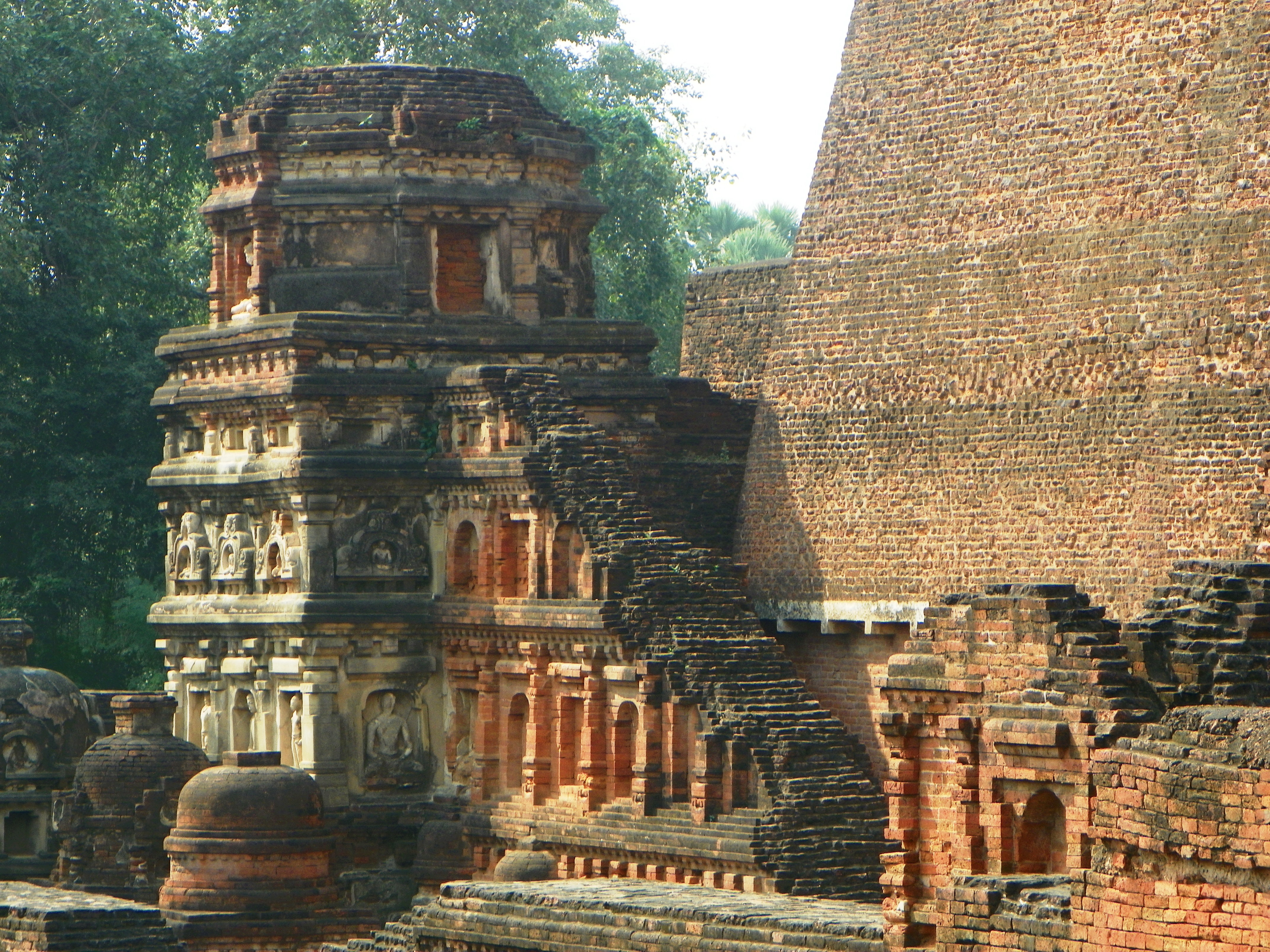
Nalanda was founded by the Gupta emperors in the early 5th century and then expanded over the next 7 centuries.

Nalanda's dateable history begins in the 5th century. A seal discovered at the site identifies a monarch named Shakraditya (Śakrāditya - r. c. 415–455 CE) as its founder and attributes the foundation of a sangharama (monastery) at the site to him. This is corroborated by the Chinese pilgrim Xuanzang travelogue. The tradition of formalised Vedic learning "helped to inspire the formation of large teachings centres," such as Nalanda, Taxila, and Vikramashila.

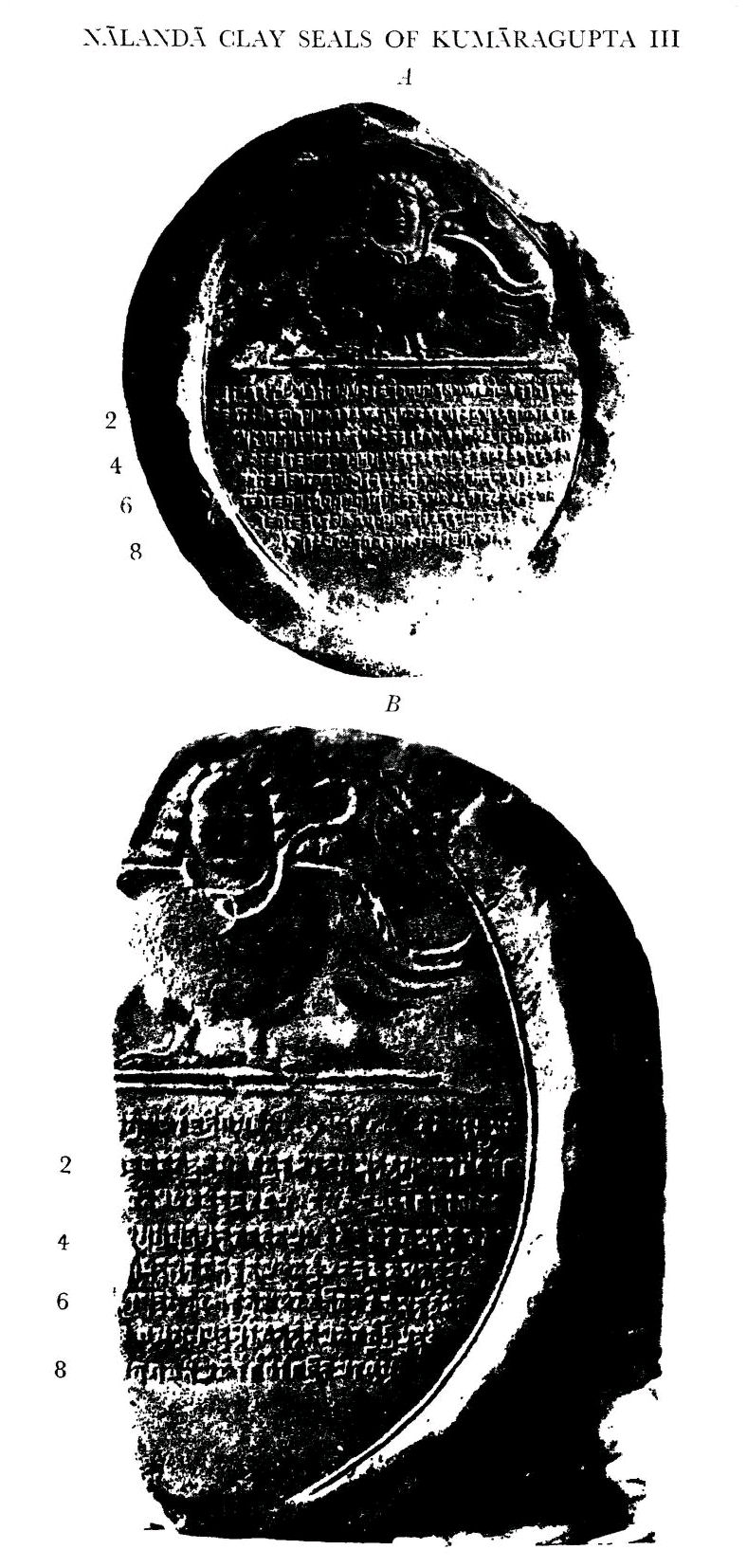
Nalanda clay seal of Kumaragupta III. The inscription is in Sanskrit, late-Gupta script, the man shown has Vaishnava mark on his forehead, and seal has Garuda-vahana on upper face.

Founder

In the Indian tradition and texts, kings were called by many epithets and names. Scholars such as Andrea Pinkney and Hartmut Scharfe conclude that Shakraditya is same as Kumaragupta I. He was the emperor belonging to the Hindu dynasty of the Guptas. Further, numismatic evidence discovered at Nalanda corroborate that Kumaragupta I was the founder patron of the Nalanda monastery-university.

His successors, Budhagupta, Tathagatagupta, Baladitya, and Vajra, later extended and expanded the institution by building additional monasteries and temples. Nalanda, thus flourished through the 5th and 6th centuries under the Guptas. These Gupta-era contributions to Nalanda are corroborated by the numerous Buddhist and Hindu seals, artwork, iconography and inscriptions discovered at Nalanda, which are in the Gupta-style and Gupta-era scripts. During this period, the Gupta kings were not the only patrons of Nalanda. They reflect a broad and religiously diverse community of supporters. It is remarkable, states Scharfe, that "many donors were not Buddhists; the emblems on their seals show Lakshmi, Ganesha, Shivalinga and Durga".

Rulers in northeast India bequeathed villages to help fund Nalanda; the king of Sumatra contributed villages for the monastery's endowment. A special fund was also established to support scholars from China.

=== Post-Gupta dynasty (550–750 CE) ===
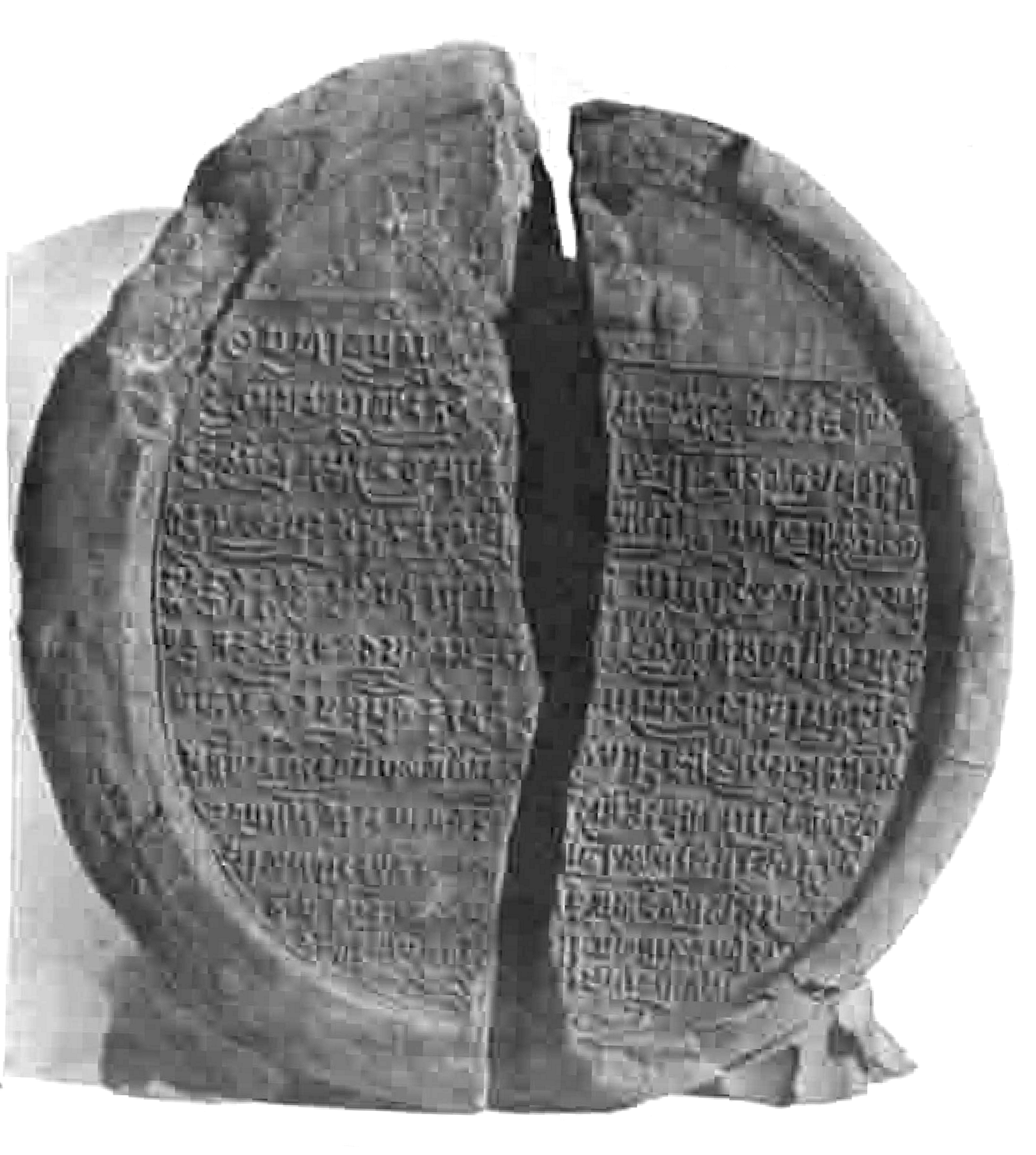
Seal of Harsha found in Nalanda

After the decline of Gupta Empire, the most notable patron of the Nalanda Mahavihara was Harsha (known as Śīlāditya in some Buddhist records). He was a seventh-century emperor with a capital at Kannauj (Kanyakubja). According to Xuanzang, Harsha was a third generation Hindu king from the Vaishya caste, who built majestic Buddhist viharas, as well as three temples – Buddha, Surya and Shiva, all of the same size. He states (c. 637 CE), "a long succession of kings" had built up Nalanda till "the whole is truly marvellous to behold". Nalanda also continued to flourish during the rule of the Later Gupta dynasty however they do not seem to have provided active support and instead favoured the construction of Hindu monuments.

In accordance with the ancient Indian traditions of supporting temples and monasteries, inscriptions found at Nalanda suggest that it received gifts, including grants of villages by kings to support its work. Harsha himself granted 100 villages and directed 200 households from each of these villages to supply the institution's monks with requisite daily supplies such as of rice, butter, and milk. This supported over 1,500 faculty and 10,000 student monks at Nalanda. These numbers, however, may be exaggerated. They are inconsistent with the much lower numbers (over 3000) given by Yijing, another Chinese pilgrim who visited Nalanda a few decades later. According to Asher, while the excavated Nalanda site is large and the number of viharas so far found are impressive, they simply cannot support 10,000 or more student monks. The total number of known rooms and their small size is such that either the number of monks must have been far less than Xuanzang's claims or the Nalanda site was many times larger than numerous excavations have so far discovered and what Xuanzang describes. (Note: The Nalanda site is not fully excavated, and the modern village of Bargaon may be on top of some of the ruins. (ASI reports, 1935–1937))

==== Xuanzang's visit (630–643 CE) ====
Xuanzang travelled around India between 630 and 643 CE, visiting Nalanda in 637 and 642, spending a total of around two years at the monastery. He was warmly welcomed in Nalanda where he received the Indian name of Mokshadeva and studied under the guidance of Shilabhadra, the venerable head of the institution at the time. He believed that the aim of his arduous overland journey to India had been achieved as in Shilabhadra he had at last found an incomparable teacher to instruct him in Yogachara, a school of thought that had then only partially been transmitted to China. Besides Buddhist studies, the monk also attended courses in grammar, logic, and Sanskrit, and later also lectured at the Mahavihara.

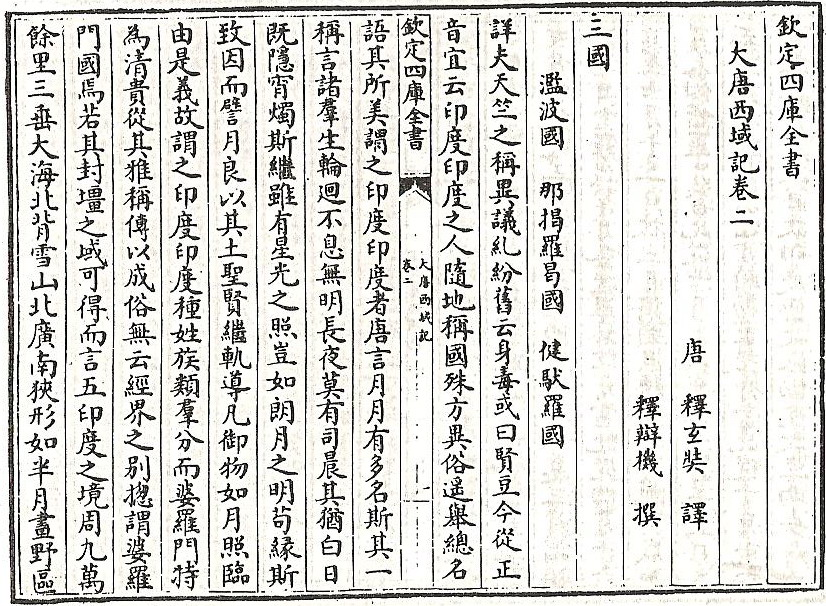
A page from Xuanzang's Great Tang Records on the Western Regions or Dà Táng Xīyù Jì

In the detailed account of his stay at Nalanda, the pilgrim describes the view out of the window of his quarters thus,

Moreover, the whole establishment is surrounded by a brick wall, which encloses the entire convent from without. One gate opens into the great college, from which are separated eight other halls standing in the middle (of the Sangharama). The richly adorned towers, and the fairy-like turrets, like pointed hill-tops are congregated together. The observatories seem to be lost in the vapours (of the morning), and the upper rooms tower above the clouds.

Xuanzang returned to China with 657 Sanskrit texts and 150 relics carried by 20 horses in 520 cases. He translated 74 of the texts himself.

==== Yijing's visit (673–700 CE) ====
In the thirty years following Xuanzang's return, no fewer than eleven travellers from China and Korea are known to have visited Nalanda, including the monk Yijing. Unlike Faxian and Xuanzang, Yijing followed the sea route around Southeast Asia and Sri Lanka. He arrived in 673 CE, and stayed in India for fourteen years, ten of which he spent at the Nalanda Mahavihara. When he returned to China in 695, he had with him 400 Sanskrit texts and 300 grains of Buddha relics which were subsequently translated in China.

Unlike Xuanzang, who also described the geography and culture of seventh-century India, Yijing's account primarily concentrates on the practice of Buddhism in India and detailed descriptions of the customs, rules, and regulations of the monks at the monastery. In his chronicle, Yijing notes that revenues from 200 villages (as opposed to 100 in Xuanzang's time) had been assigned toward the maintenance of Nalanda. He described there being eight vihara with as many as 300 cells. According to him, Nalanda monastery has numerous daily Nikaya procedures and rules for the monks. He gives many examples. In one subsection he explains that the monastery has ten great pools. The morning begins with the ghanta (bell) being rung. Monks take their bathing sheets and go to one of these pools. They bathe with their underwear on, then get out slowly to avoid disturbing anyone else. They wipe their bodies, then wrap this 5-foot long and 1.5-foot wide sheet around the waist, change their clothes with this wrap in place. Then rinse, wring and dry the sheet. The entire procedure, says Yijing, is explained in the Buddhist Nikaya procedures. The day must begin with bathing, but bathing after meals is forbidden. The Nalanda Nikaya has many such daily procedures and rituals set out for the monks to follow.

==== Korean and Tibetan pilgrims ====
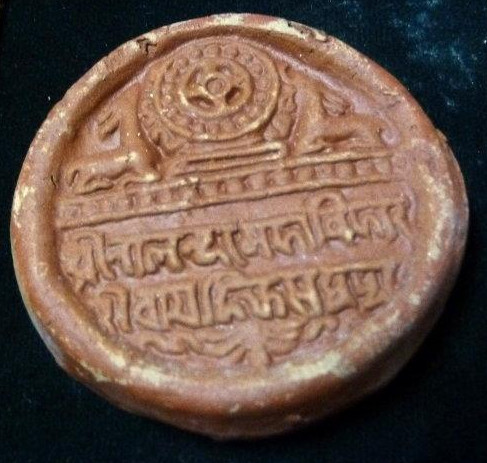
Replica of the seal of Nalanda set in terracotta on display in the Archaeological Survey of India Museum in Nalanda

In addition to Chinese pilgrims, Buddhist pilgrims from Korea also visited India about the same time as Xuanzang and Yingji. The Chinese travelogues about India became known in the 19th century and have been well published. After the mid-20th century, the Korean pilgrim journeys have come to light. For example, monks such as Kyom-ik began visiting Indian monasteries by the mid-6th century. They too carried Indian texts and translated them, producing 72 chuan of translated texts. In the mid-7th century, the Silla (Korean: 신라) monk Hyon-jo visited and stayed at several Indian monasteries, including three years at Nalanda, his visit corroborated by Yingji. He sent his students Hye-ryun and Hyon-gak to Nalanda for studies, the latter died at Nalanda. They adopted Indian names to interact with the fellow students; for example, Hye-ryun was known as Prajnavarman and it is this name that is found in the records. According to Korean records, monks visited India through the ninth century – despite arduous travel challenges – to study at various monasteries, and Nalanda was the most revered.

In and after the 7th century, Tibetan monks such as Thonmi Sambhota came to Nalanda and other Indian monasteries to study, not only Buddhism, but Sanskrit language, grammar and other subjects. Sambhota is credited with applying the principles of Sanskrit and its grammar to remodel Tibetan language and its script. It was after Sambhota's first return from Nalanda that the Tibetan king adopted Buddhism and committed to making it the religion of his people. Tibetan monks lived closer to Nepal, Sikkim and eastern India, with simpler travel itineraries than the Koreans and others. Tibetans continued to visit Magadha during the Pala era, and beyond through the 14th century, thereby participated in the crucible of ideas at Nalanda and other monasteries in Bihar and Bengal. However, after the 8th century, it was the esoteric mandala and deities-driven Vajrayana Buddhism that increasingly dominated the exchange.

=== Pala dynasty (750–1200 CE) ===
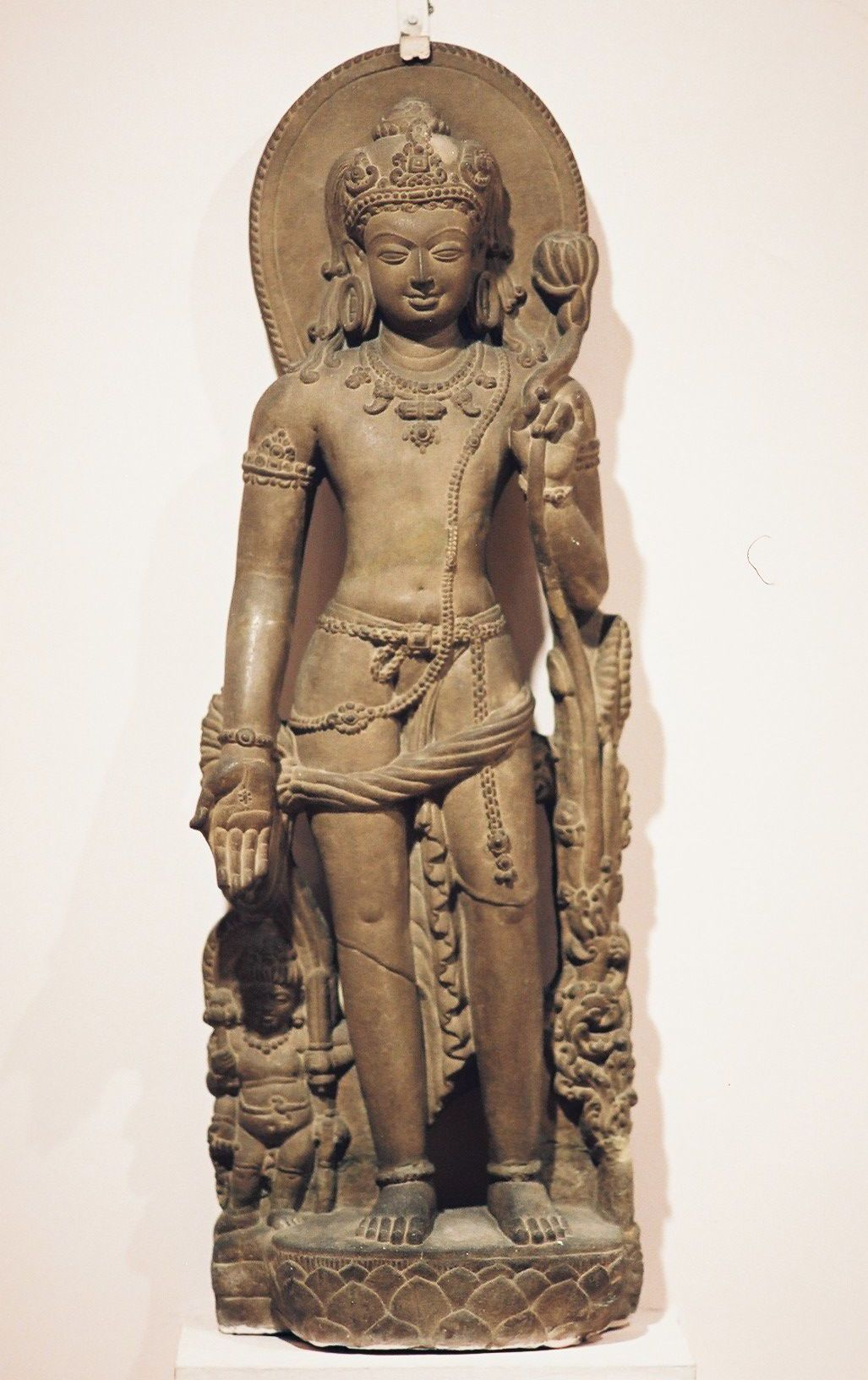
Avalokisteshvara in Khasarpana Lokesvara form from Nalanda, 9th-century.

The Palas established themselves in eastern regions of India in the mid-8th century and reigned until the last quarter of the 12th century, they were a Buddhist dynasty. However, under the Palas, the traditional Mahayana Buddhism of Nalanda that inspired East Asian pilgrims such as Xuanzang was superseded by the then newly emerging Vajrayana tradition, a Tantra-imbibed, eros- and deity-inclusive esoteric version of Buddhism. Nalanda continued to get support from the Palas, but they subscribed to Vajrayana Buddhism and they were prolific builders of new monasteries on Vajrayana mandala ideas such as those at Jagaddala, Odantapura, Somapura, and Vikramashila. Odantapura was founded by Gopala, the progenitor of the royal line, only 9.7 kilometres (6 mi) from Nalanda. These competing monasteries, some just a few kilometres away from Nalanda likely drew away a number of learned monks from Nalanda.

Inscriptions, literary evidence, seals, and ruined artwork excavated at the Nalanda site suggest that Nalanda remained active and continued to thrive under the Palas. Kings Dharmapala and Devapala were active patrons. A number of 9th-century metallic statues containing references to Devapala have been found in its ruins as well as two notable inscriptions. The first, a copper plate inscription unearthed at Nalanda, details an endowment by the Shailendra King, Balaputradeva of Suvarnadvipa (Sumatra in modern-day Indonesia). This Srivijayan king, "attracted by the manifold excellences of Nalanda" had built a monastery there and had requested Devapala to grant the revenue of five villages for its upkeep, a request which was granted. The Ghosrawan inscription is the other inscription from Devapala's time and it mentions that he received and patronised a bhikṣu named Viradeva, who had studied all the Vedas in his youth, and who was later elected the head of Nalanda.

Inscriptions issued between the 9th and 12th centuries attest gifts and support to Nalanda for the upkeep of the monastery, maintenance of the monks, copying of palm leaf manuscripts (necessary for preservation given the Indian tropical climate). One inscription also mentions the destruction of a Nalanda library of manuscripts by fire, and support for its restoration. Another 10th-century inscription quotes Bhadracari of the Sautrantikas tradition, attesting the activity of diverse schools of Buddhism at Nalanda. Another Nalanda inscription from the 11th century mentions a gift of "revolving bookcase".

While the Palas continued to patronise Nalanda liberally, the fame and influence of Nalanda helped the Palas. The Srivijaya kingdom of southeast Asia maintained a direct contact with Nalanda and the Palas, thus influencing the 9th to 12th century art in Sumatra, Java, southern Thailand and regions that actively traded with the Srivijaya kingdom. The influence extended to the Indonesian Shailendra dynasty. The Indonesian bronzes and votive tablets from this period show the creativity of its people, yet the iconographic themes overlap with those found at Nalanda and nearby region. Monks from Indonesia, Myanmar and other parts of southeast Asia came to Nalanda during the Pala rule.

=== Destruction during Afghan conquest (c. 1200 CE) ===
Archeological excavations at the site during 1920-1921 revealed a thick layer of ashes on the uppermost strata, across many buildings separated by some distance; this suggests that Nalanda was subject to a catastrophic fire. This is held to be arson, blamed upon the troops of Muhammad Bakhtiyar Khalji who had plundered the region c. 1200 CE, and cited to be the leading cause of Nalanda's demise. A passage from Minhaj-i-Siraj's Tabaqat-i Nasiri which actually describes the destruction of Odantapura Vihar (var. Bihar Sharif), a monastery just a few miles from Nalanda, is offered in support. While such a reading is misplaced, it is true that Nalanda was raided by Khalji.

Tibetan records are another source of information about the events at Nalanda in the late 12th century and much of the 13th century. These were the decades of widespread systematic destruction of monasteries in this region, and historical records in Tibet affirm that monks from Nalanda and nearby monasteries such as the Vikramashila monastery who "survived the slaughter, fled to Tibet". Among the Tibetan records, the most useful is the biography of the Tibetan monk-pilgrim Dharmasvamin discovered in 1936. It is useful because Dharmasvamin reports having met the fleeing monks and scholars during his travels. He visited Bihar about 1234, and spent one monsoon season at Nalanda. He described the conditions there in the decades after the sack of Nalanda and other Buddhist monasteries in the Magadha region of India. His account states that the destruction of Nalanda was not an accident or misunderstanding but a part of the widespread destruction of Buddhist monasteries and monuments, including the destruction of Bodh Gaya. The vast manuscript libraries of Magadha had been mostly lost. Other Tibetan monks and he had shifted to Nepal, as the place to study, copy and move manuscripts to Tibet. According to his account, the Turushka-Qarluq (Turk) conquest extended from about 1193 to 1205, the destruction was systematic with "Turushka soldiers razing a monastery to the ground and throwing the stones into Ganges river". Fear of persecution was strong in the 1230s, and his colleagues dissuaded him from going to Magadha. According to George Roerich, "his [Chag lo-tsa-ba Chos-rje-dpal, Dharmasvamin] account conveys something of the anxiety of [the Buddhist community of] those days."

Chapter 10 of Dharmasvamin's biography describes Nalanda in c. 1235 CE. Dharmasvamin found it "largely damaged and deserted". Despite the perils, some had re-gathered and resumed their scholastic activities at Nalanda, but at a vastly smaller scale and with donations from a wealthy Brahmin layperson named Jayadeva. The monks were patronised by a local dynasty known as the Pithipatis of Bodh Gaya to which the king, Buddhasena, belonged. His account states:

There resided a venerable and learned monk who was more than ninety years old, the Guru and Mahapandita Rahula Sribhadra. Raja Buddhasena of Magadha honored this Guru and four other Panditas, and about seventy venerable ones (monks).

— Dharmasvamin (Translator: George Roerich)

While he stayed there for six months under the tutelage of Rahula Shribhadra, Dharmasvamin makes no mention of the legendary library of Nalanda which possibly did not survive the initial wave of Turko-Afghan attacks. He also reported that some structures had survived, with "eighty small viharas, built of bricks and many left undamaged" but "there was absolutely no one to look after them". He described the arrest of their patron Jayadeva by Muslim soldiers who threaten to kill him for supporting the monks of Nalanda. Jayadeva sent a message to the monks that the Turushka soldiers intended to kill Guru Rahulasribhadra and his students, and that they should flee.

Dharmasvamin also provided an eyewitness account of an attack on an abandoned mahavihara by Muslim soldiers stationed at nearby Odantapura (now Bihar Sharif), which had been turned into a military headquarters. Only Dharmasvamin and his nonagenarian instructor stayed behind, hiding themselves while the rest of the monks fled.

The Buddhist monk Dhyānabhadra, who was born in 1289, is recorded as attending Nalanda from the age of eight indicating that the university was still into the late thirteenth century.

Another Tibetan source is that of Lama Taranatha, but this is from the late 16th century, and it is unclear what its sources were. The Taranatha account about Buddhism in India repeats the legendary accounts of Nalanda from the Buddha and Ashoka periods found in Xuanzang and other sources, then shifts to centuries of the 2nd millennium. It describes Islamic raids in 12th-century India, states that whole of Magadha fell to the Turushka (Turks, a common term for Muslims in historic Indic and Tibetan texts). Their armies, asserts Taranatha, destroyed Odantapuri as well as Vikramashila. As Taranatha's account was centuries after the events and there was no clear chain of sources within the Tibetan tradition of record-keeping, its reliability is questionable.

=== Legendary accounts ===
Tibetan texts such as the 18th-century work named Pag sam jon zang and 16th/17th-century Taranatha's account include fictional Tibetan legends. These include stories such as a king Cingalaraja had brought "all Hindus and Turuskas [Muslims]" up to Delhi under his control, and converted from Hinduism to Buddhism under the influence of his queen, and him restoring the monasteries.

Others state that a southern king built thousands of monasteries and temples again, Muslim robbers murdered this king, thereafter Nalanda was repaired by Mudita Bhadra and a minister named Kukutasiddha erected a temple there.

However, there is no evidence for the existence of such a king (or sultan), minister, Muslim robbers, thousands of Buddhist monuments built in India between the 13th and 19th century, or of any significant Nalanda repairs in or after the 13th century. (Note: Variants of similar fictional accounts about Nalanda before the 4th century are found in several Tibetan works and Chinese pilgrim accounts. There are fictional stories in Tibetan texts for post-12th-century era too, with names of ahistorical and unverifiable "kings", "sages", "arsonists", "thousands of new Buddhist monasteries and temples" and "Muslim robbers murdering a king". For example, the Taranatha account (c. 1600 CE) in Chapters 19 and 20, describes the tale of Muditabhabhadra, Malikabuddhi and Kakutsiddha. It states that, after a Persian king from Kashmir and his Muslim army destroyed Magadha and "heavily damaged Sri Nalendra [Nalanda]", one king named Krisnaraja built twenty one centres of Buddhist doctrine in madhya-desha (central India) with one thousand caityas containing images of (Buddhist) deities, but Muslim robbers murdered him and his "blood flowed in the form of milk and flowers filled the sky"; then Muditabhabhadra rebuilt those damaged caityas leading all "householders and brahmanas" to revere the Buddha; thereafter Kakutsiddha built a temple at Nalanda and consecrated it with a great feast. Then "young naughty" monks teased two beggars, who became very angry, one of whom dug a deep pit and pursued sadhana for twelve years and gained magical powers. He performed a yajna and produced magical ashes. He gathered these ashes, then spread them near the Dharmaganja library of Nalanda, which started a fire to destroy the library's collection. However, from the ninth floor miraculous water poured out and all the literature on which this water reached remained unburnt. The two tirthika-arsonists escaped to Ha-sa-ma (Assam), a Buddhapaksha repaired the monuments again and "vastly learned monks" assembled and from their memorised literature rewrote the works that were burnt down in the library.) (Note: Nalanda's library with palm-leaf manuscripts did have incidences of fire damage in its history. A 10th-century stone inscription notes a destruction by fire and subsequent restoration at the Mahavihara during the reign of Mahipala (r. 988–1038).)

=== Continued influence ===
Johan Elverskog – a scholar of religious studies and history, states that it is incorrect to say Nalanda's end was sudden and complete by about 1202, because it continued to have some students well into the 13th century. Elverskog, relying on Arthur Waley's 1932 paper, states that this is confirmed by the fact a monk ordained in 13th-century Nalanda travelled to the court of Khubilai Khan. He adds that it is wrong to say that Buddhism ended in India around the 13th or 14th century or earlier, because "[Buddha] Dharma survived in India at least until the 17th-century".

==== Aftermath of its destruction and influence on Tibetan Buddhist Tradition ====
After the Islamic conquest, the destruction and the demise of Nalanda, other monasteries and Buddhist culture from the plains of Bihar and Bengal, the brand memory of "Nalanda" remained the most revered in Tibet. The last throne-holder of Nalanda, Shakyashri Bhadra of Kashmir, fled to Tibet in 1204 at the invitation of the Tibetan translator Tropu Lotsawa (Khro-phu Lo-tsa-ba Byams-pa dpal). Some of the surviving Nalanda books were taken by fleeing monks to Tibet. He took with him several Indian masters: Sugataśrī, (an expert in Madhyamaka and Prajñāpāramitā); Jayadatta (Vinaya); Vibhūticandra (grammar and Abhidharma), Dānaśīla (logic), Saṅghaśrī (Candavyākaraṇa), Jīvagupta (books of Maitreya), Mahābodhi,(Bodhicaryāvatāra); and Kālacandra (Kālacakra).

In 1351, Tibetans committed to recreating a monastery in the heart of Tibet, staffing it with monk-scholars from diverse Buddhist schools, and name it the "Nalanda monastery" in the honour of the ancient Nalanda, according to the Blue Annals (Tibetan: དེབ་ཐེར་སྔོན་པོ). This institution emerged north of Lhasa in 1436 through the efforts of Rongtön Mawé Sengge, then expanded in the 15th century. It is now called the Tibetan Nalanda, to distinguish it from this site.

Tibetan Buddhist tradition is regarded to be a continuation of the Nalanda tradition. The Dalai Lama states:

Tibetan Buddhism is not an invention of the Tibetans. Rather, it is quite clear that it derives from the pure lineage of the tradition of the Nalanda Monastery. The master Nagarjuna hailed from this institution, as did many other important philosophers and logicians...

The Dalai Lama refers to himself as a follower of the lineage of the seventeen Nalanda masters.

An Astasahasrika Prajnaparamita Sutra manuscript preserved at the Tsethang monastery has superbly painted and well preserved wooden covers and 139 leaves. According to its colophon it was donated by the mother of the great pandita Sri Asoka in the second year of the reign of King Surapala, at the very end of the 11th century. Nalanda still continued to operate into the 14th century as the Indian monk, Dhyānabhadra was said to have been a monk at Nalanda prior to his travels in East Asia.

=== Under the East India Company and British Empire (1800–1947) ===
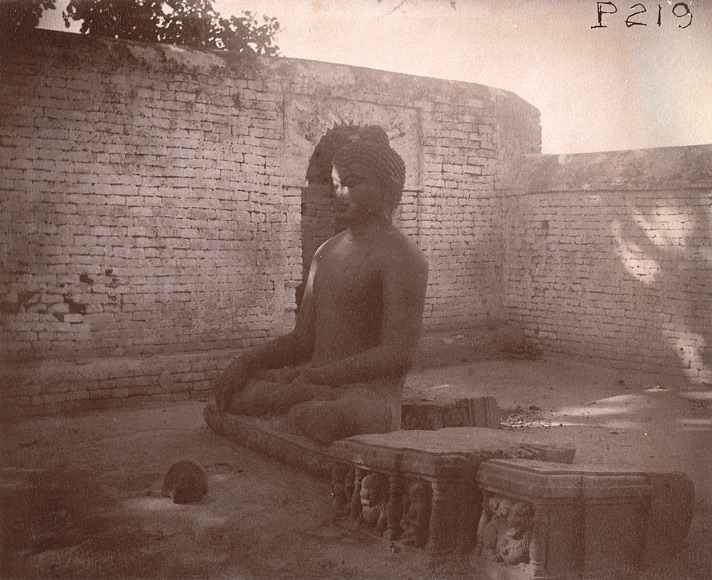
A statue of Gautama Buddha at Nalanda in 1895.

After its decline, Nalanda was largely forgotten until Francis Buchanan-Hamilton surveyed the site in 1811–1812 after locals in the vicinity drew his attention to some Buddhist and Hindu images and ruins in the area. He, however, did not associate the mounds of earth and debris with famed Nalanda. That link was established by Major Markham Kittoe in 1847. Alexander Cunningham and the newly formed Archaeological Survey of India conducted an official survey in 1861–1862. Systematic excavation of the ruins by the ASI did not begin until 1915 and ended in 1937. The first four excavations were led by Spooner between 1915 and 1919. The next two were led by Sastri in 1920 and 1921. The next seven seasons of archaeological excavations through 1928 were led by Page. These efforts were not merely digging, observation and cataloguing of discoveries, they included conservation, restoration and changes to the site such as drainage to prevent damage to unearthed floors. After 1928, Kuraishi led two seasons of excavations, Chandra led the next four. The last season was led by Ghosh, but the excavations were abbreviated in 1937 for financial reasons and budget cuts. Chandra and final ASI team leaders noted that the "long row of monasteries extend further into the modern village of Bargaon" and the "extent of entire monastic establishment can only be determined by future excavations".

=== Post–independence (Post-1947) ===
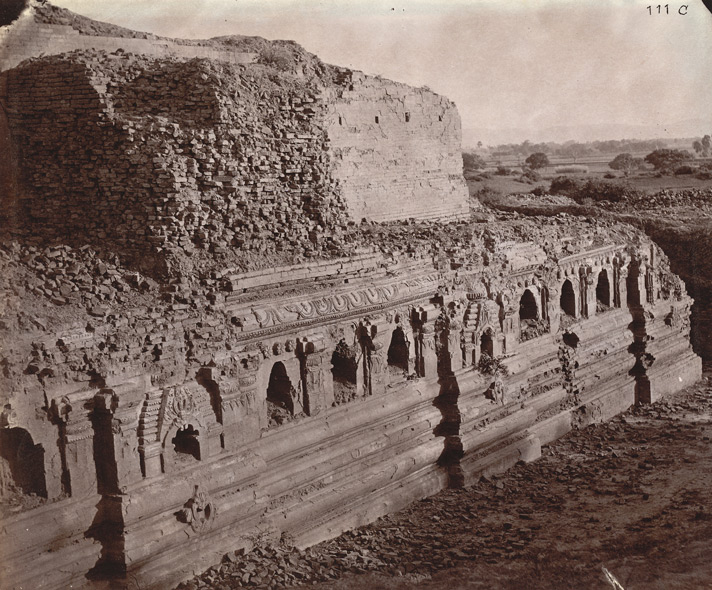
Rear view of the ruins of the Baladitya Temple in 1872.

Post independence, the second round of excavation and restoration took place between 1974 and 1982. In 1951, the Nava Nalanda Mahavihara (New Nalanda Mahavihara), a modern centre for Pali and Buddhism in the spirit of the ancient institution, was founded by the Government of Bihar near Nalanda's ruins at the suggestion of Rajendra Prasad, India's first president. It was deemed to be a university in 2006.

1 September 2014 saw the commencement of the first academic year of a modern Nalanda University, with 15 students, in nearby Rajgir. Nalanda University (also known as Nalanda International University) is an international and research-intensive university located in the historical city of Rajgir in Bihar, India. It was established by an Act of Parliament to emulate the famous ancient university of Nalanda, which functioned between the 5th and 13th centuries. The idea to resurrect Nalanda University was endorsed in 2007 at the East Asia Summit, represented mostly by Asian countries including China, Singapore, Japan, Malaysia and Vietnam, apart from Australia and New Zealand, and as such, the university is seen as one of the flagship projects of the Government of India. It has been designated as an "Institution of National Importance" by the Parliament, and began its first academic session on 1 September 2014. Initially set up with temporary facilities in Rajgir, a modern campus spanning over 160 hectares (400 acres) is expected to be finished by 2020. This campus, upon completion, will be the largest of its kind in India, and one of the largest in Asia.

== The Mahavihara ==
While its excavated ruins today only occupy an area of around 488 by 244 metres (1,600 by 800 ft) or roughly 12 hectares, Nalanda Mahavihara occupied a far greater area in medieval times. The subjects taught at Nalanda covered every field of learning, and it attracted pupils and scholars from Korea, Japan, China, Tibet, Indonesia, Persia and Turkey.

Although Nalanda is often labelled a Buddhist university, it had many facets that were not strictly or exclusively Buddhist. Its Gupta patrons, for instance, were adherents of Hinduism, not Buddhism.

=== The university ===
At its peak the school attracted scholars and students from near and far, with some travelling from Tibet, China, Korea, and Central Asia. The highly formalised methods of Shramanic studies helped the establishment of large teaching institutions such as Taxila, Nalanda, and Vikramashila, which are often characterised as India's early universities. Archaeological evidence also notes contact with the Shailendra dynasty of Indonesia, one of whose kings built a monastery in the complex. Nalanda flourished under the patronage of the Gupta Empire in the 5th and 6th centuries, and later under Harsha, the emperor of Kannauj. The liberal cultural traditions inherited from the Gupta age resulted in a period of growth and prosperity until the ninth century CE. The subsequent centuries were a time of gradual decline, a period during which the tantric developments of Buddhism became most pronounced in eastern India under the Pala Empire.

Much of our knowledge of Nalanda comes from the writings of pilgrim monks from Asia, such as Xuanzang and Yijing, who travelled to the Mahavihara in the 7th century CE. Vincent Smith remarked that "a detailed history of Nalanda would be a history of Mahayanist Buddhism." Many of the names listed by Xuanzang in his travelogue as alumni of Nalanda are the names of those who developed the overall philosophy of Mahayana. All students at Nalanda studied Mahayana, as well as the texts of the eighteen (Hinayana) sects of Buddhism. Their curriculum also included other subjects, such as the Vedas, logic, Sanskrit grammar, medicine, and Samkhya.

Nalanda was destroyed three times but was rebuilt only twice. It was ransacked and destroyed by an army of the Mamluk dynasty of the Delhi Sultanate under Bakhtiyar Khalji in c. 1202 CE. While some sources note that the Mahavihara continued to function in a makeshift fashion after this attack, it was eventually abandoned altogether and forgotten until the 19th century, when the site was surveyed and preliminary excavations were conducted by the Archaeological Survey of India. Systematic excavations commenced in 1915, which unearthed eleven monasteries and six brick temples neatly arranged on grounds 12 hectares (30 acres) in area. A trove of sculptures, coins, seals, and inscriptions have also been discovered in the ruins, many of which are on display in the Nalanda Archaeological Museum, situated nearby. Nalanda is now a notable tourist destination, and a part of the Buddhist tourism circuit.

On 25 November 2010, the Indian government, through an Act of Parliament, 'resurrected' the ancient university through the Nalanda University Bill, with which they chose to create a new Nalanda University relatively nearby. It has been designated as an "International University of National Importance," and has accordingly been subject to intense government oversight, with both of its past chancellors explicitly citing Government actions for them leaving their post and courses being shut down due to members of the ruling party disapproving of them.

=== The library ===
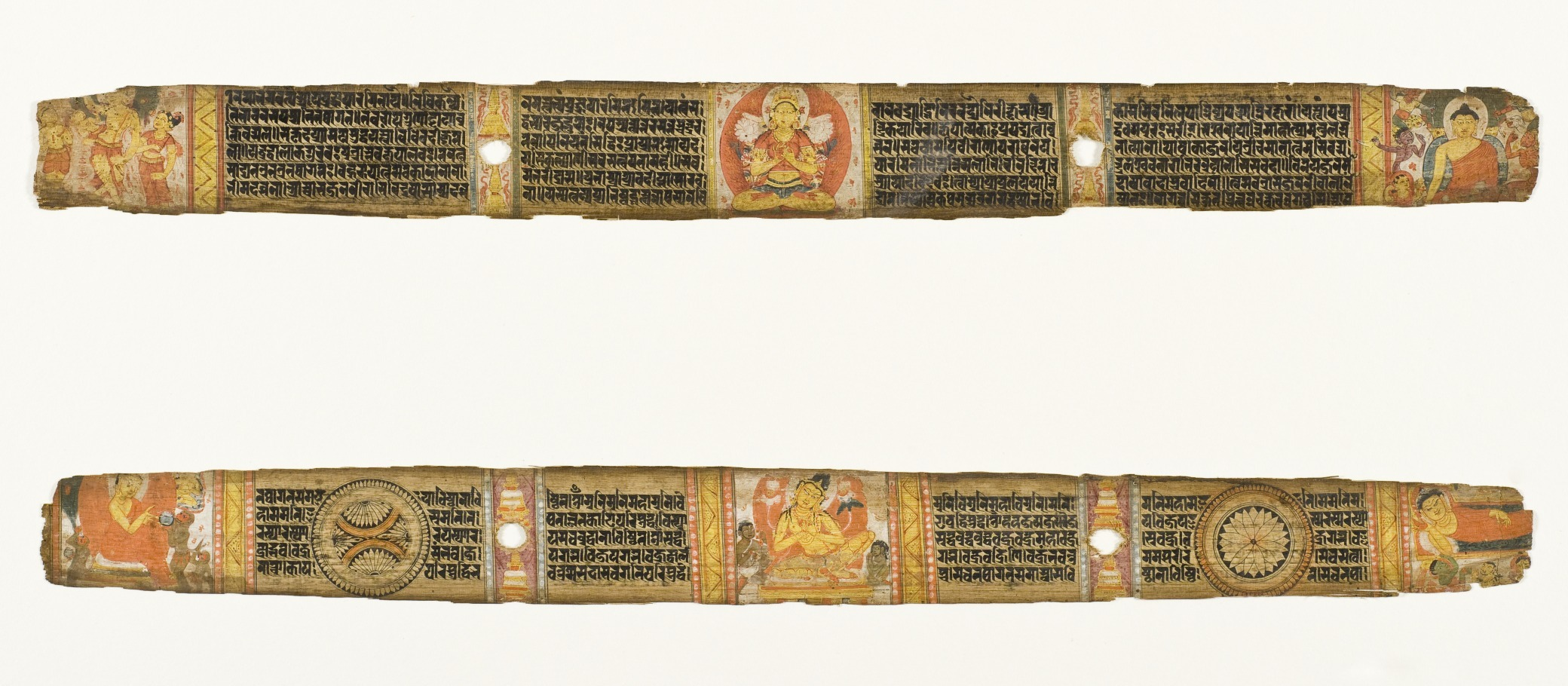
Prajnaparamita and Scenes from the Buddha's Life (top), Maitreya and Scenes from the Buddha's Life (bottom), Folios from a Dharanisamgraha, manuscript from Nalanda, circa 1075

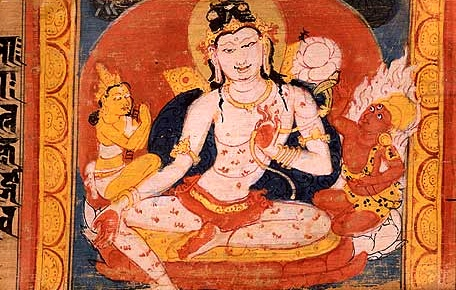
Avalokiteshvara Bodhisattva. Ashtasahasrika Prajnyaparamita Sutra manuscript from Nalanda's Pala period.

It is evident from the large numbers of texts that Yijing carried back with him after his 10-year residence at Nalanda, that the Mahavihara must have featured a well-equipped library. Traditional Tibetan sources mention the existence of a great library at Nalanda named Dharmaganja (Piety Mart) which comprised three large multi-storeyed buildings, the Ratnasagara (Ocean of Jewels), the Ratnodadhi (Sea of Jewels), and the Ratnaranjaka (Jewel-adorned). Ratnodadhi was nine storeys high and housed the most sacred manuscripts including the Prajnyaparamita Sutra and the Guhyasamaja.

The exact number of volumes in the Nalanda library is not known, but it is estimated to have been in the hundreds of thousands. When a Buddhist scholar at Nalanda died, his manuscripts were added to the library collection. The library not only collected religious manuscripts but also had texts on such subjects as grammar, logic, literature, astrology, astronomy, and medicine. The Nalanda library must have had a classification scheme which was possibly based on a text classification scheme developed by the Sanskrit linguist, Panini. Buddhist texts were most likely divided into three classes based on the Tripitaka's three main divisions: the Vinaya, Sutra, and the Abhidhamma.

=== Curriculum ===
In his biography of Xuanzang, Hwui-Li states that all the students of Nalanda studied the Great Vehicle (Mahayana) as well as the works of the eighteen Nikaya traditions of Buddhism. In addition to these, they studied other subjects such as the Vedas, Hetuvidyā (Logic), Shabdavidya (Grammar and Philology), Chikitsavidya (Medicine), the works on magic (the Atharvaveda), and Samkhya. According to Frazier, the Vedic studies included Vedic texts and ritual, but also the different theoretical disciplines associated with the limbs or the sciences of the Vedas, which included disciplines such as linguistics, law, astronomy and reasoning.

Xuanzang himself studied a number of these subjects at Nalanda under Shilabhadra and others. Besides theology and philosophy, frequent debates and discussions necessitated competence in Logic. A student at the Mahavihara had to be well-versed in the systems of Logic associated with all the different schools of thought of the time as he was expected to defend Buddhist systems against the others. Other subjects believed to have been taught at Nalanda include law, astronomy, and city-planning.

Tibetan tradition holds that there were "four doxographies" (Standard Tibetan: grub mtha') which were taught at Nalanda:

1. Sarvastivada Vaibhashika
2. Sarvastivada Sautrantika
3. Madhyamaka, the Mahayana philosophy of Nagarjuna
4. Chittamatra, the Mahayana philosophy of Asanga and Vasubandhu

In the 7th century, Xuanzang recorded the number of teachers at Nalanda as being around 1510. Of these, approximately 1000 were able to explain 20 collections of sutras and shastras, 500 were able to explain 30 collections, and only 10 teachers were able to explain 50 collections. Xuanzang was among the few who were able to explain 50 collections or more. At this time, only the abbot Shilabhadra had studied all the major collections of sutras and shastras at Nalanda.

=== Administration ===
The Chinese monk Yijing wrote that matters of discussion and administration at Nalanda would require assembly and consensus on decisions by all those at the assembly, as well as resident monks:

If the monks had some business, they would assemble to discuss the matter. Then they ordered the officer, Vihārapāla, to circulate and report the matter to the resident monks one by one with folded hands. With the objection of a single monk, it would not pass. There was no use of beating or thumping to announce his case. In case a monk did something without consent of all the residents, he would be forced to leave the monastery. If there was a difference of opinion on a certain issue, they would give reason to convince (the other group). No force or coercion was used to convince.

Xuanzang also noted:

The lives of all these virtuous men were naturally governed by habits of the most solemn and strictest kind. Thus in the seven hundred years of the monastery's existence no man has ever contravened the rules of the discipline. The king showers it with the signs of his respect and veneration and has assigned the revenue from a hundred cities to pay for the maintenance of the religious.

=== Influence on Buddhism ===
A vast amount of what came to comprise Tibetan Buddhism, both its Mahayana and Vajrayana traditions, stems from the teachers and traditions at Nalanda. Shantarakshita, who pioneered the propagation of Buddhism in Tibet in the 8th century was a scholar of Nalanda. He was invited by the Tibetan king, Khri-sron-deu-tsan, and established the monastery at Samye, serving as its first abbot. He and his disciple Kamalashila (who was also of Nalanda) essentially taught Tibetans how to do philosophy. Padmasambhava, who was also invited from Nalanda Mahavihara by the king in 747 CE, is credited as a founder of Tibetan Buddhism.

The scholar Dharmakirti (c. 7th century), one of the Buddhist founders of Indian philosophical logic, as well as one of the primary theorists of Buddhist atomism, taught at Nalanda.

Other forms of Buddhism, such as the Mahayana Buddhism followed in Vietnam, China, Korea and Japan, flourished within the walls of the ancient school. A number of scholars have associated some Mahayana texts such as the Shurangama Sutra, an important sutra in East Asian Buddhism, with the Buddhist tradition at Nalanda. Ron Epstein also notes that the general doctrinal position of the sutra does indeed correspond to what is known about the Buddhist teachings at Nalanda toward the end of the Gupta period when it was translated.

Several Buddhist institutions overseas have chosen to call themselves Nalanda to acknowledge Nalanda's influence. These include Nalanda Buddhist Society in Malaysia and Nalanda College, Colombo, Sri Lanka, Nalanda Buddhist Education Foundation, Indonesia, Nalanda Buddhist Institute, Bhutan

=== World Heritage Sites Recognition ===
The Nalanda Mahavihara is recognised as a World Heritage Site by the UNESCO in 2016.

== Notable scholars ==
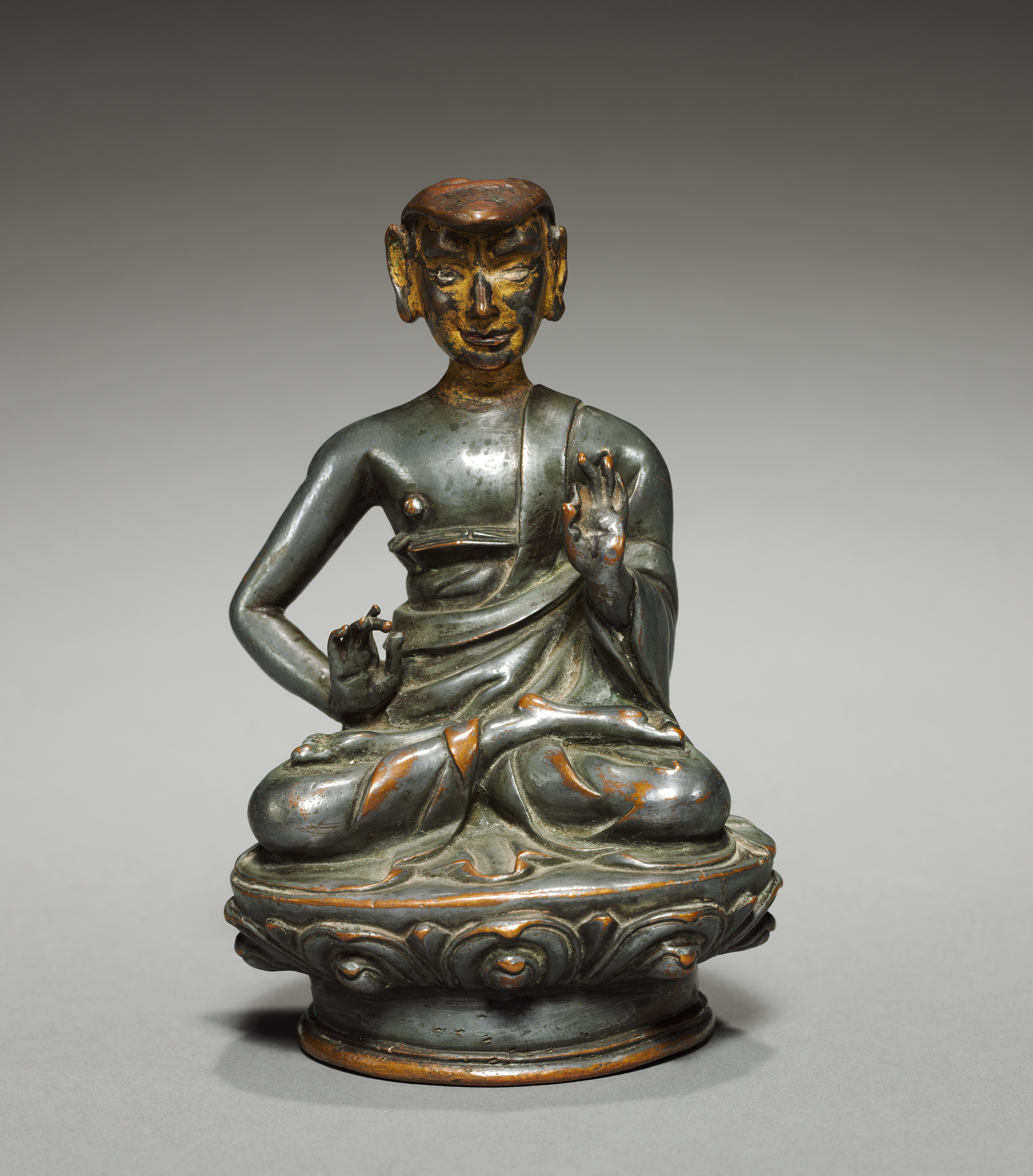
15th/16th-century sculpture of Dharmakirti

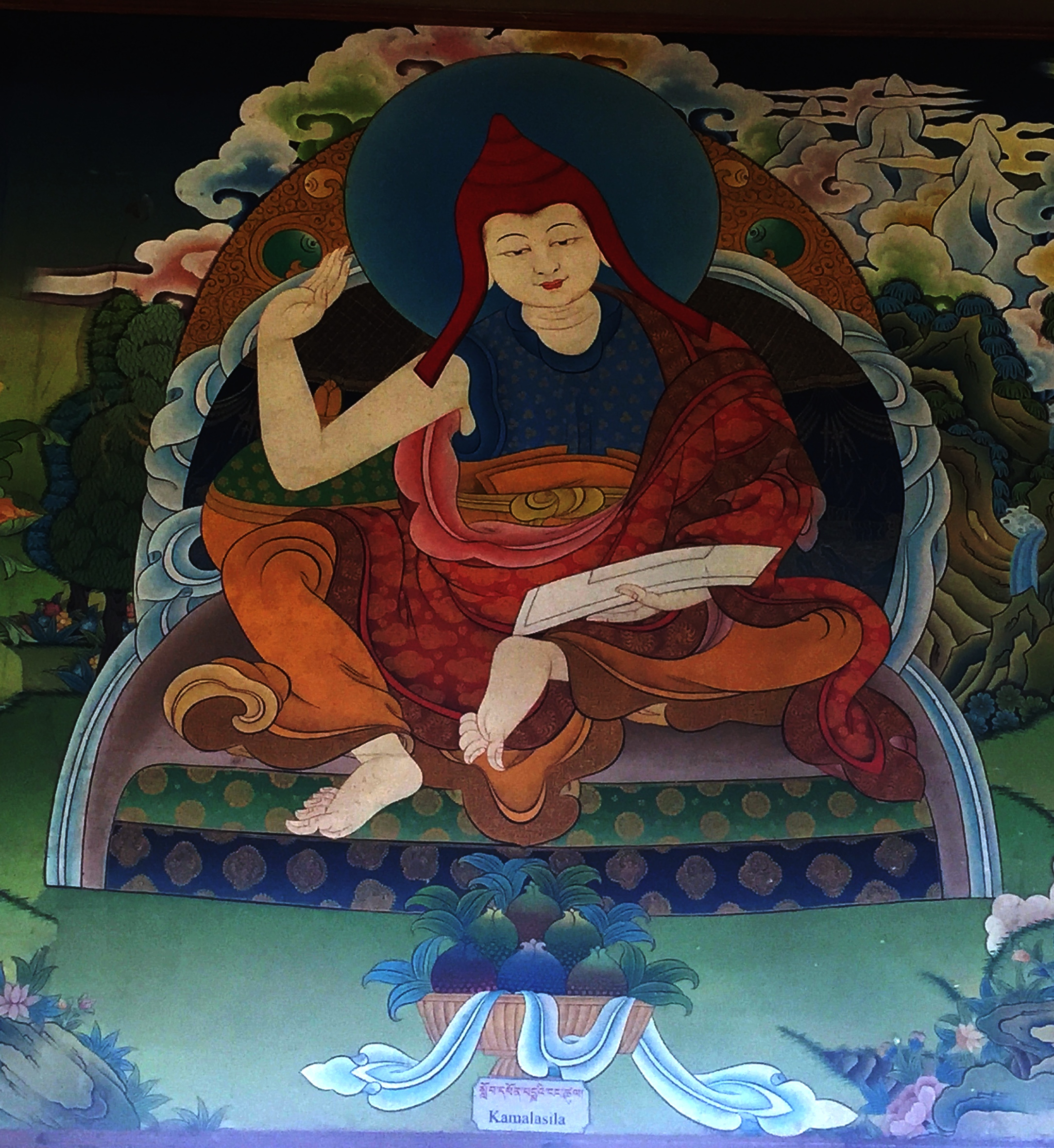
Tibetan depiction of Kamalaśīla

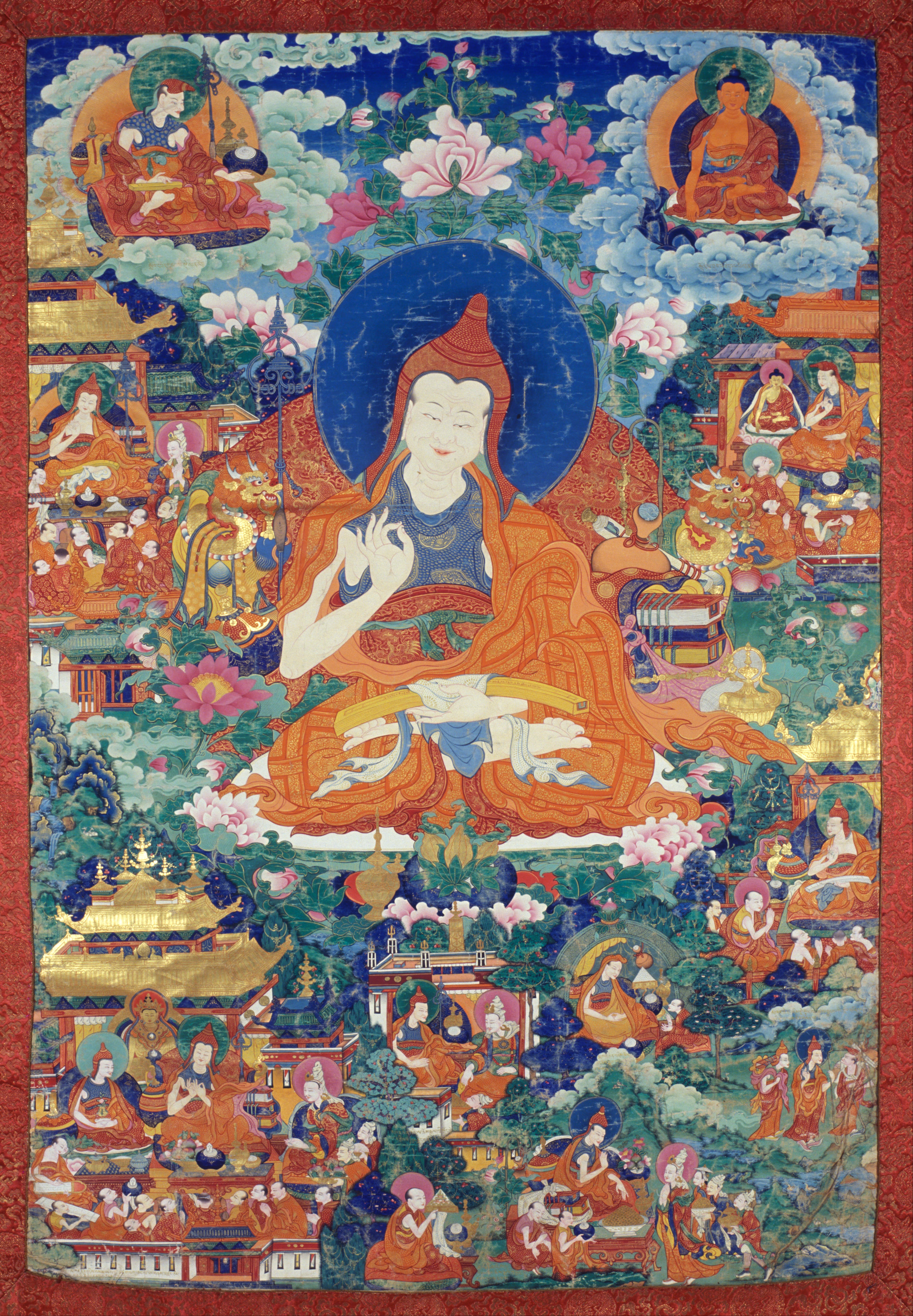
8th-century Buddhist Abbot of Nalanda, Śāntarakṣita

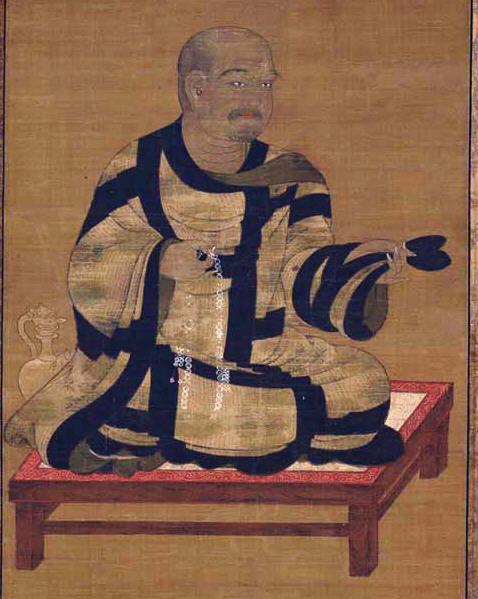
Painting of Vajrabodhi, Japan, 14th century

Traditional sources state that Nalanda was visited by both Mahavira and the Buddha in c. 6th and 5th century BCE. It is also the place of birth and nirvana of Shariputra, one of the famous disciples of Buddha.

Other historical figures associated with Nalanda include:

- Abhayakaragupta, Vajrayana and Mahayana Buddhist monk at Vikramashila who also spent time at Nalanda
- Ariyabalma, 7th century Korean Buddhist monk
- Aryadeva, student of Nagarjuna and proponent of Mahayana Buddhism
- Asanga, Mahayana Buddhist monk proponent of the Yogacarya school
- Atisha, Vajrayana Buddhist scholar
- Buddhaguhya, Vajrayana Buddhist monk and scholar
- Chandrakirti, Mahayana Buddhist monk and student of Nagarjuna
- Chandragomin, Mahayana Buddhist lay scholar
- Dharmakirti, Mahayana Buddhist monk and logician
- Dharmapala, Mahayana Buddhist monk of the Yogacara school
- Dharmasvamin, 13th-century Tibetan monk and possibly the last foreign monk to study at Nalanda
- Dhyānabhadra, Mahayana Buddhist monk and translator
- Dignaga, founder of Buddhist Logic
- Kamalaśīla, Mahayana Buddhist monk and former abbot of Nalanda
- Maitripada, Indian Buddhist Mahasiddha
- Nagarjuna, formaliser of the concept of Shunyata
- Naropa, Buddhist Mahasiddha
- Prabhakāramitra, Translator of Mahayana Buddhist texts who was active in Tang China
- Prajñā, 9th century monk from Kapisa in modern-day Afghanistan
- Śākyaśribhadra, abbot of Nalanda during the late 12th century
- Śāntarakṣita, Mahayana Buddhist monk and former abbot of Nalanda
- Saraha, one of the 84 Mahasiddhas active in the 8th century CE
- Shantideva, composer of the Bodhisattvacarya
- Shilabhadra, Mahayana Buddhist monk and the teacher of Xuanzang
- Śubhakarasiṃha, Buddhist monk of Nalanda who later travelled to China and translated Indian Buddhist texts
- Subhūticandra, Indian Buddhist scholar active in the 11th and 12th century
- Thonmi Sambhota, 7th century Tibetan scholar who is traditionally credited with creating the Tibetan script
- Vairocanavajra, 12th-century Buddhist translator and alchemist who studied at Nalanda
- Vajrabodhi, 7th–8th century Indian esoteric Buddhist monk and one of the patriarchs of Chinese Esoteric Buddhism and Shingon Buddhism
- Vasubandhu, brother of Asanga
- Wukong, 8th century Chinese Buddhist monk
- Xuanzang, 7th century Chinese Buddhist monk, scholar and traveller
- Yijing, 7th century Chinese Buddhist traveller

== Excavated remains ==
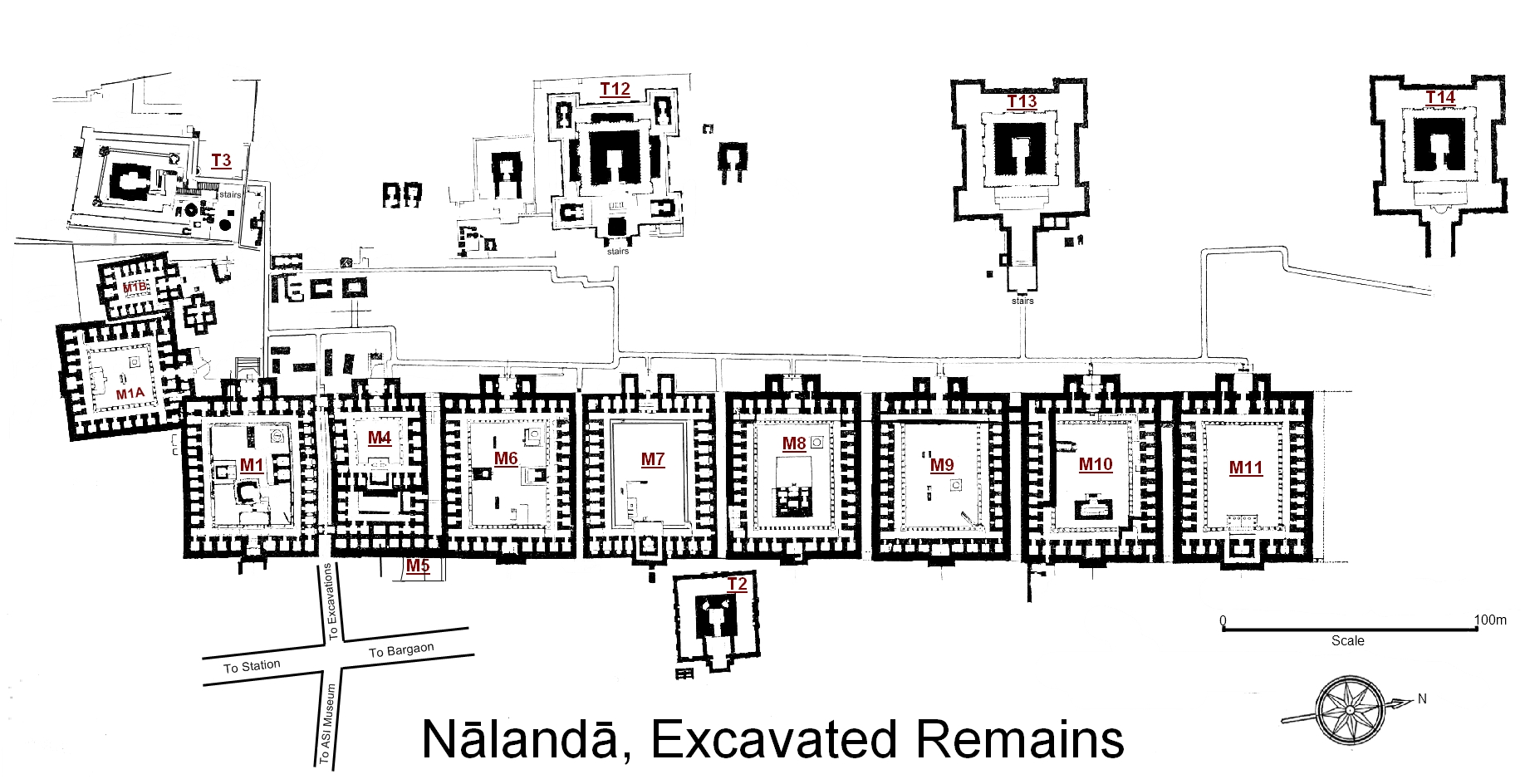
A map of the excavated remains of Nalanda.

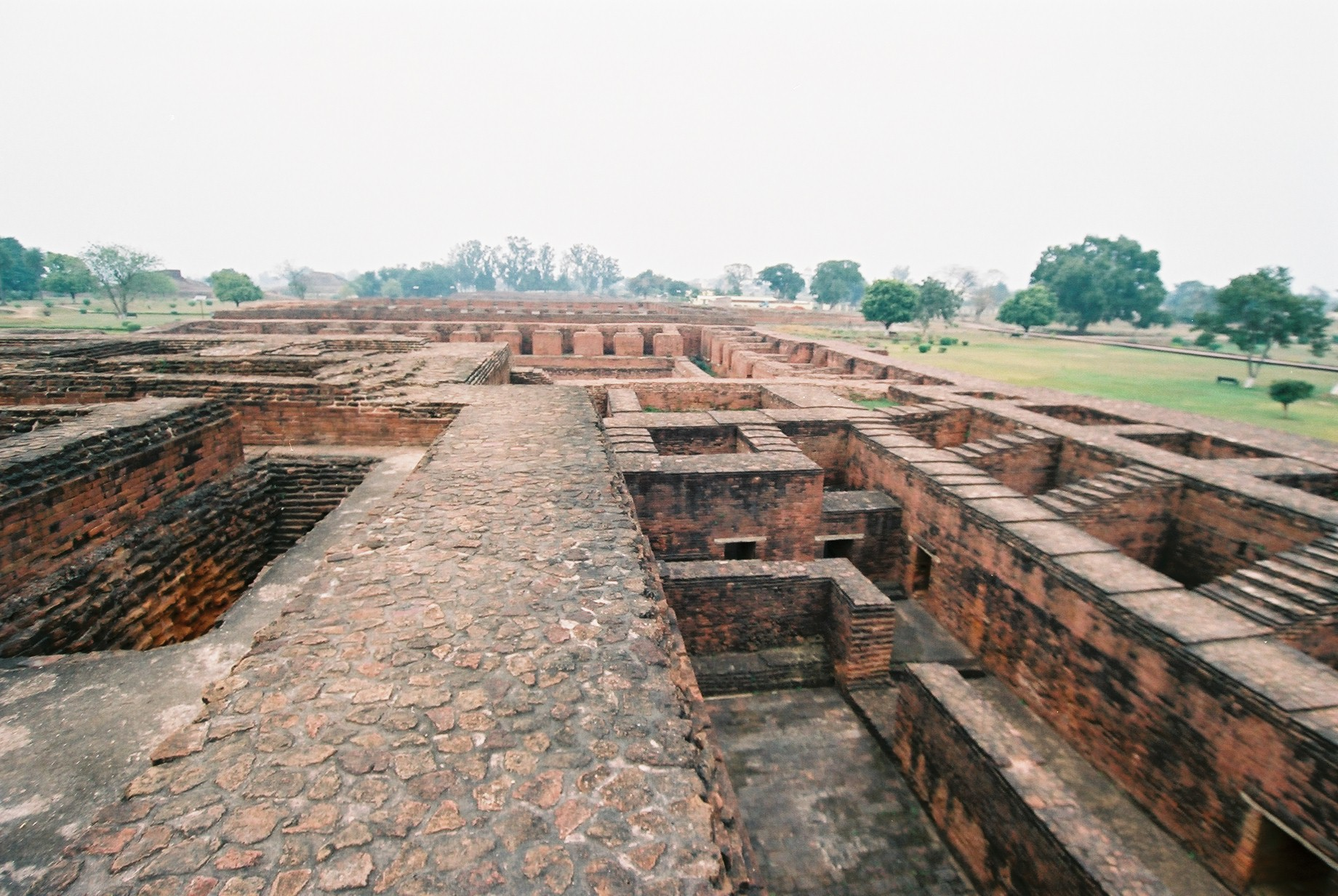
Excavated ruins of the monasteries of Nalanda.

After its decline, Nalanda was largely forgotten until Francis Buchanan-Hamilton surveyed the site in 1811–1812 after locals in the vicinity drew his attention to a vast complex of ruins in the area. He, however, did not associate the mounds of earth and debris with famed Nalanda. That link was established by Major Markham Kittoe in 1847. Alexander Cunningham and the newly formed Archaeological Survey of India conducted an official survey in 1861–1862. Systematic excavation of the ruins by the ASI did not begin until 1915 and ended in 1937. The second round of excavation and restoration took place between 1974 and 1982.

The remains of Nalanda today extend some 488 metres (1,600 ft) north to south and around 244 metres (800 ft) east to west. Excavations have revealed eleven monasteries (also known as vihara) and six major brick temples arranged in an ordered layout. A 30 m (100 ft) wide passage runs from north to south with the temples to its west and the monasteries to its east. Most structures show evidence of multiple periods of construction with new buildings being raised atop the ruins of old ones. Many of the buildings also display signs of damage by fire on at least one occasion.

The map gives the layout of the excavated structures. Temple 3 in the south was the most imposing structure. Temple 12, 13, 14 face the monasteries and face east. With the exception of those designated 1A and 1B, the monasteries all face west with drains emptying out in the east and staircases positioned in the south-west corner of the buildings. Temple 2 was to the east.

All the monasteries at Nalanda are very similar in layout and general appearance. Their plan involves a rectangular form with a central quadrangular court which is surrounded by a verandah which, in turn, is bounded by an outer row of cells for the monks – a typical design of vihara architecture. The central cell facing the entrance leading into the court is a shrine chamber. Its strategic position means that it would have been the first thing that drew the eye when entering the edifice. With the exception of those designated 1A and 1B, the monasteries all face west with drains emptying out in the east and staircases positioned in the south-west corner of the buildings.

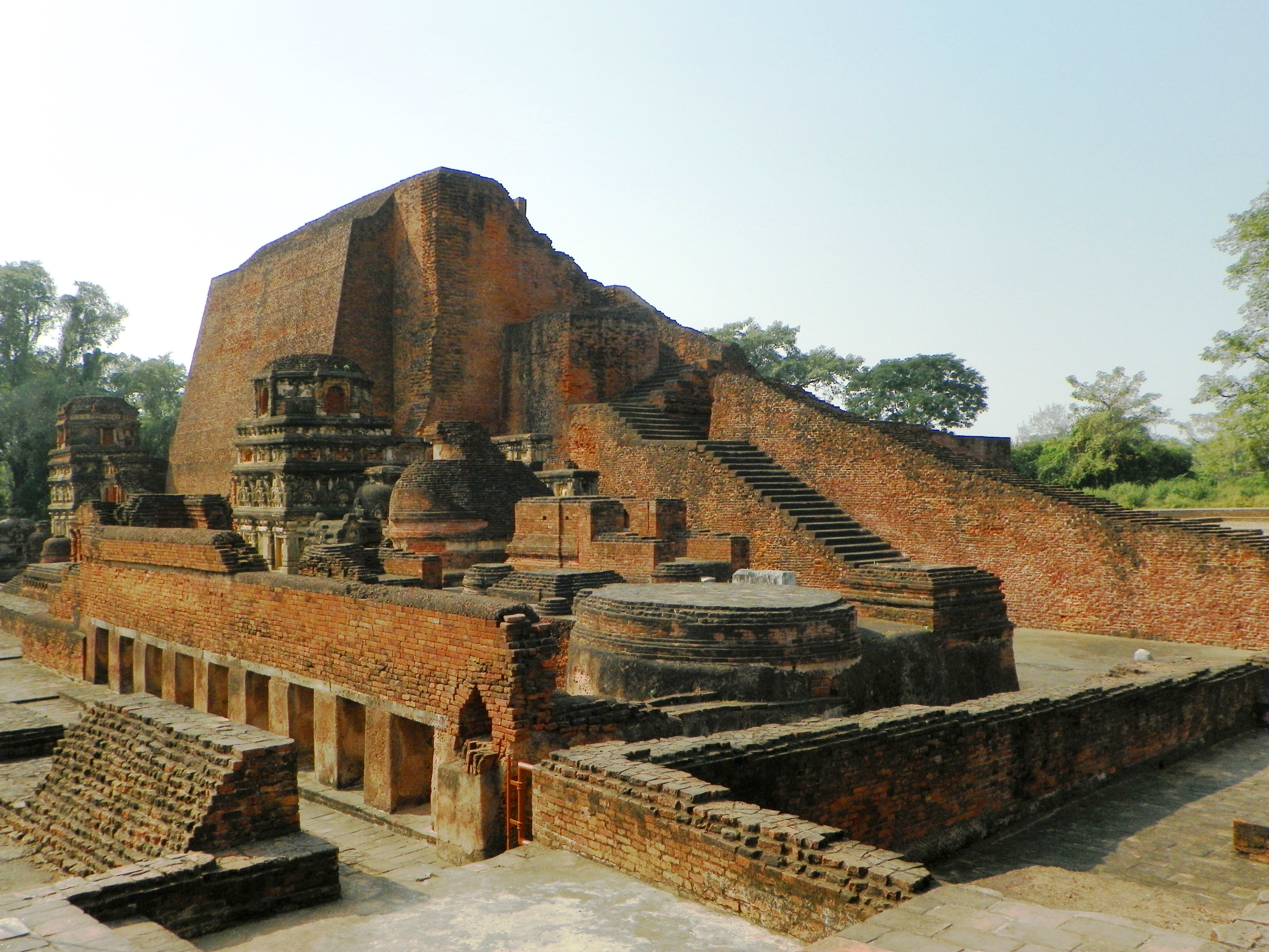
Temple no. 3 (Sariputta Stupa)

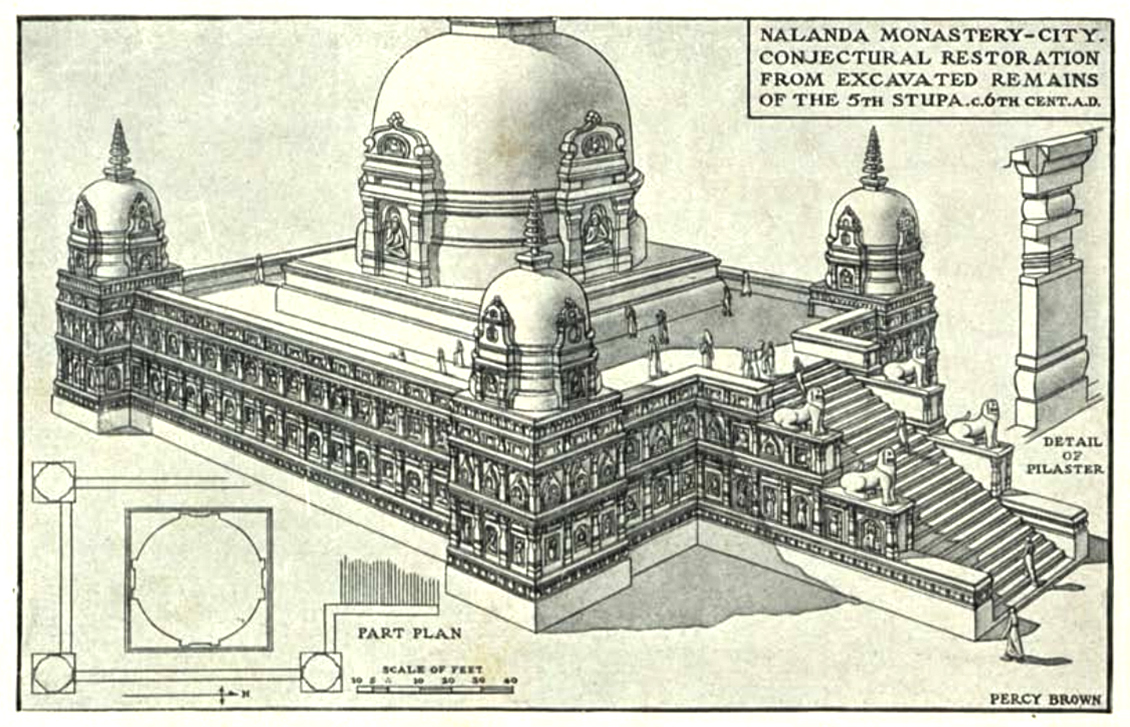
Conjectural Reconstruction of Temple no. 3, Nalanda University

Monastery 1 is considered the oldest and the most important of the monastery group and shows as many as nine levels of construction. Its lower monastery is believed to be the one sponsored by Balaputradeva, the Srivijayan king, during the reign of Devapala in the 9th century (see Nalanda copper-plate of Devapala). The building was originally at least 2 storeys high and contained a colossal statue of a seated Buddha. Temple no. 3 (also termed Sariputta Stupa) is the most iconic of Nalanda's structures with its multiple flights of stairs that lead all the way to the top. The temple was originally a small structure which was built upon and enlarged by later constructions. Archaeological evidence shows that the final structure was a result of at least seven successive such accumulations of construction. The fifth of these layered temples is the most interesting and the best preserved with four corner towers of which three have been exposed. The towers as well as the sides of the stairs are decorated with exquisite panels of Gupta-era art depicting a variety of stucco figures including Buddha and the Bodhisattvas, scenes from the Jataka tales. The temple is surrounded by numerous votive stupas some of which have been built with bricks inscribed with passages from sacred Buddhist texts. The apex of Temple no. 3 features a shrine chamber which now only contains the pedestal upon which an immense statue of Buddha must have once rested. According to Win Maung, the stupa was influenced by Gupta architecture, which itself had Kushana era influences. In a shrine near the bottom of the staircase, a large image of Avalotiteshvar was found which was eventually moved to the museum.

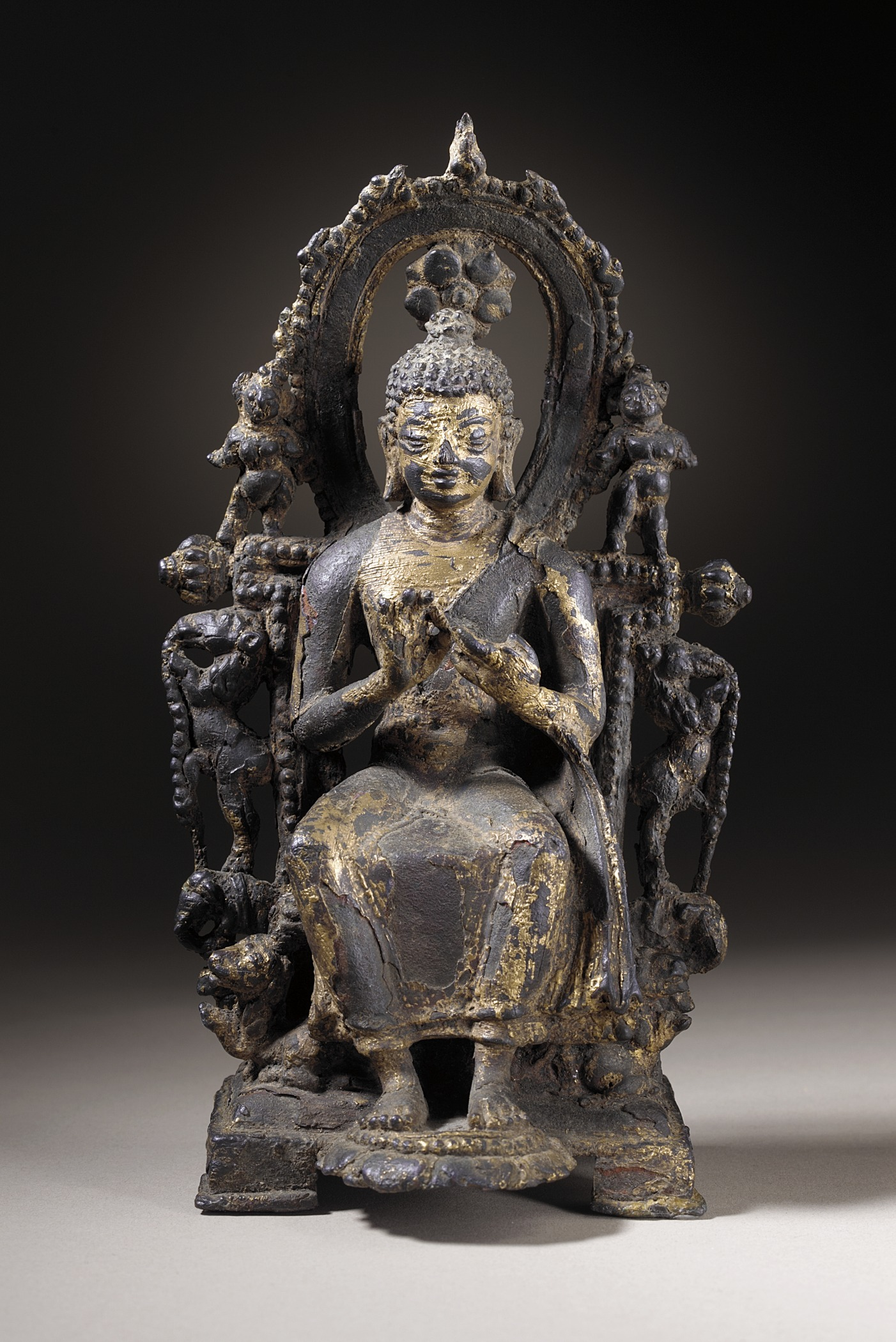
Buddha Shakyamuni or the Bodhisattva Maitreya, gilt copper alloy, early 8th century, Nalanda

Temple no. 2 notably features 211 sculptured religious and secular panels. These include Shiva, Parvati, Kartikeya, and Gajalakshmi, Kinnaras playing musical instruments, various representations of Makaras, as well as human couples in amorous postures, as well as scenes of art and of everyday life. Susan Huntington and Bhaskara Misra – scholars of Indian architecture and arts, state Temple 2 as a Hindu temple. However, Huu Phuoc Le – a scholar of Buddhist architecture, questions this purely "Hindu affiliation", stating that it could be a temple based on the mandala principles, and one reflecting "Hindu-Buddhist syncretism" of the 8th to 12th century when Shaiva and Shakti deities were integrated into Vajrayana Buddhism. The site of Temple no. 13 features a brick-made smelting furnace with four chambers. The discovery of burnt metal and slag suggests that it was used to cast metallic objects. Birendra Nath Mishra also observed that the panels containing Hindu deities were attached to the structure with iron clamps indicating that they were probably added at a later date. In addition, only ten per cent of the panels contain Hindu deities. Temple no. 2 is also located outside of the monastic enclosure although it is close to it hence it can be inferred that the inclusion of Hindu deities at this site was a "Buddhist attempt at subordinate integration of Brahmanism to Buddhism without employing any confrontationist imagery".

To the north of Temple 13 lie the remains of Temple no. 14. An enormous image of the Buddha was discovered here. The image's pedestal features fragments of the only surviving exhibit of mural painting at Nalanda.

To the east of Temple 2, lie the remains of Sarai Temple in the recently excavated Sarai Mound. This multi-storeyed Buddhist temple with many stupas and shrines was enclosed by a massive wall enclosure. The remains in the sanctum suggest that the Buddha statue was around 24 metres (80 ft) high.

Numerous sculptures, as well as many murals, copper plates, artworks, inscriptions, seals, coins, plaques, potteries and works in stone, bronze, stucco, and terracotta, have been unearthed within the ruins of Nalanda. The Buddhist sculptures discovered notably include those of the Buddha in different postures, Avalokiteshvara, Jambhala, Manjushri, Marichi, and Tara. Hindu sculptures of Vishnu, Shiva-Parvathi, Ganesha, Mahishasura Mardini, and Surya have also been found in the ruins.

A Black Buddha temple (termed by locals as the Telia Bhairav, "tel" refers to use of oil) is near Temple 14 with has an ancient large black Buddha image in bhumisparha mudra. This the same temple termed Baithak Bhairab in Cunningham's 1861–62 ASI report.

== Surviving Nalanda manuscripts ==
Fleeing monks took some of the Nalanda manuscripts. A few of them have survived and are preserved in collections such as those at:

- Los Angeles County Museum of Art Folios from a Dharanisamgraha, circa 1075.
- Asia Society This Ashtasahasrika Prajnaparamita manuscript records, in Sanskrit and Tibetan, the history of the manuscript from its creation at the famous Nalanda monastery in India through its use in Tibet by the compiler of the first Tibetan canon of Buddhism, Buton.
- Yarlung Museum, Tsetang (From the On ke ru Lha khang monastery) Astasahahasrika Prajnaparamita Sanskrit palm-leaf manuscript, with 139 leaves and painted wooden covers. According to the colophon, this manuscript was donated by the mother of the great pandita Sri Asoka in the second year of the reign of King Surapala at end of the 11th century.

== Nalanda inscriptions ==
A number of inscriptions were found during the excavation, which are now preserved in the Nalanda Museum. These include:

- Son of a minister of Yashovarman donated to the temple built by king Baladitya. 8th cent CE, basalt slab found in monastery 1.
- Murnavarman constructed a 24-metre-high (80 ft) brass image of Buddha. 7th cent CE, basalt slab, found in Sarai mound.
- Monk Vipulshrimitra built a monastery. Basalt slab, later half of 12th cent, found in the uppermost level of Monastery 7.
- Donation of Balaputradeva, the king of Suvarnadvipa of Sailendra dynasty. 860 CE Copperplate found by Hirananda Shastri in 1921 in the antechamber of Monastery 1 at Nalanda.

== Tourism ==
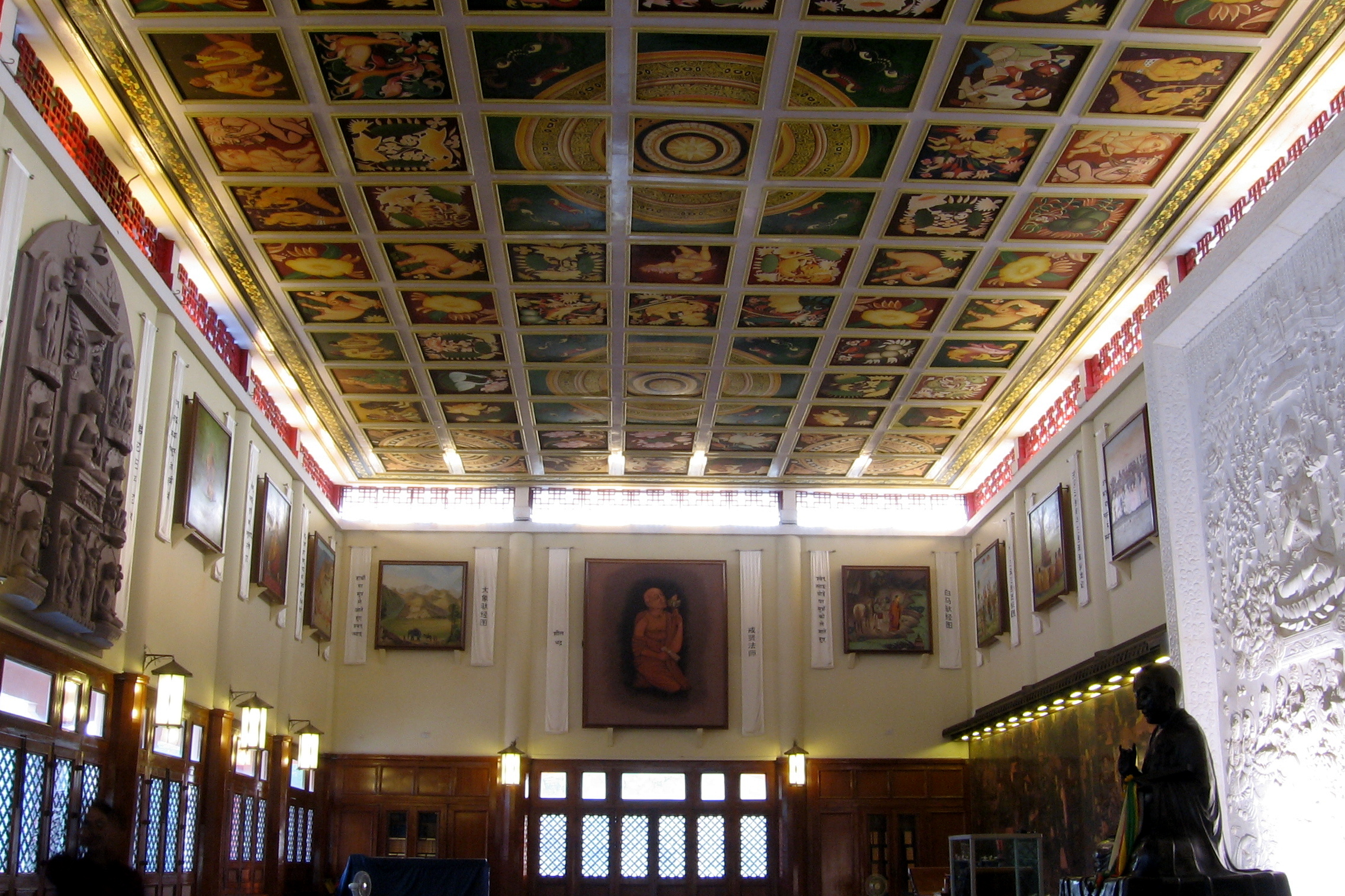
The Xuanzang Memorial Hall at Nalanda

Nalanda is a popular tourist destination in the state attracting a number of Indian and overseas visitors. It is also an important stop on the Buddhist tourism circuit.

=== Nalanda Archaeological Museum ===
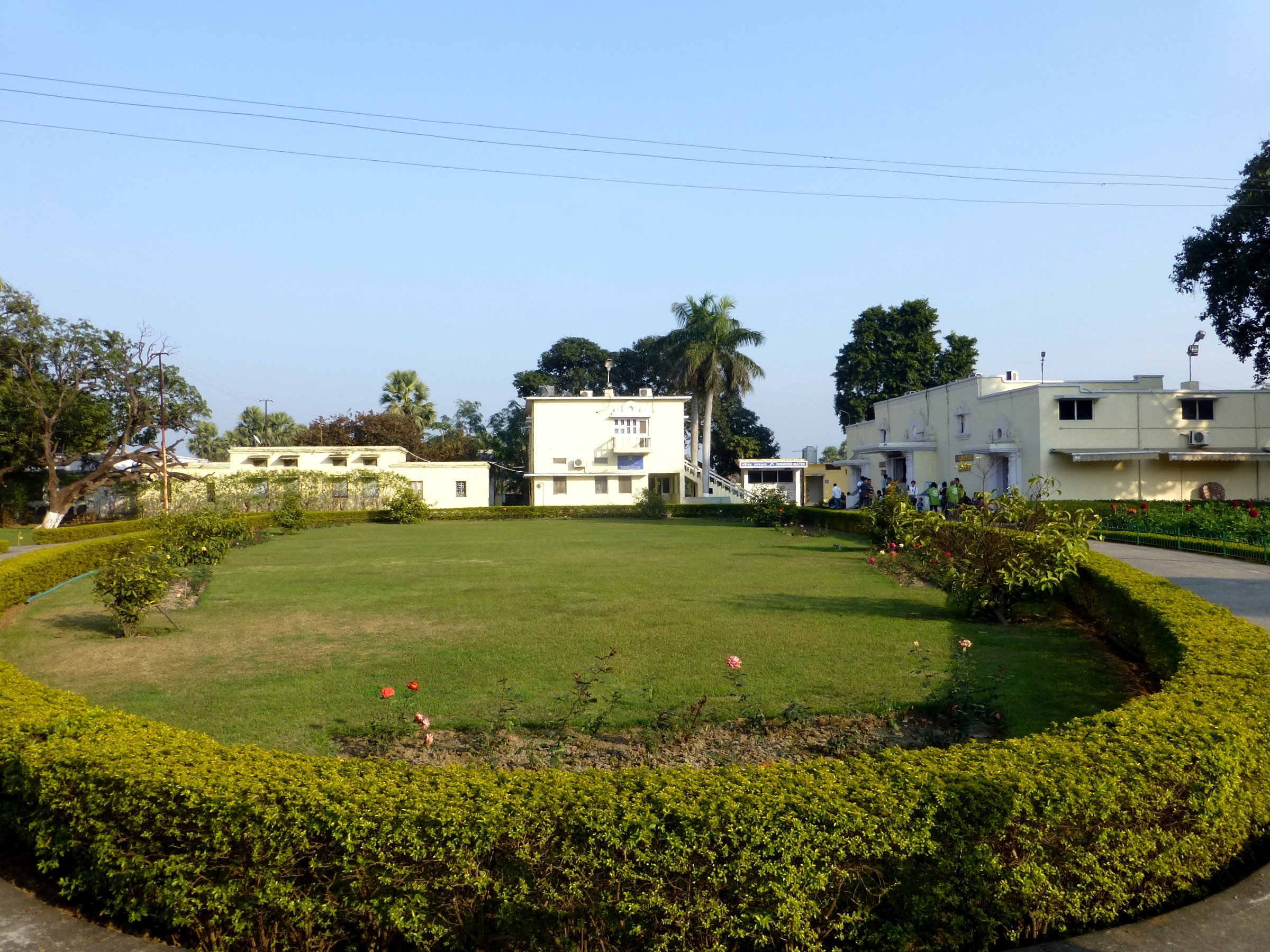
Nalanda Archaeological Museum

The Archaeological Survey of India maintains a museum near the ruins for the benefit of visitors. The museum, opened in 1917, exhibits the antiquities that have been unearthed at Nalanda as well as from nearby Rajgir. Out of 13,463 items, only 349 are on display in four galleries.

=== Xuanzang Memorial Hall ===
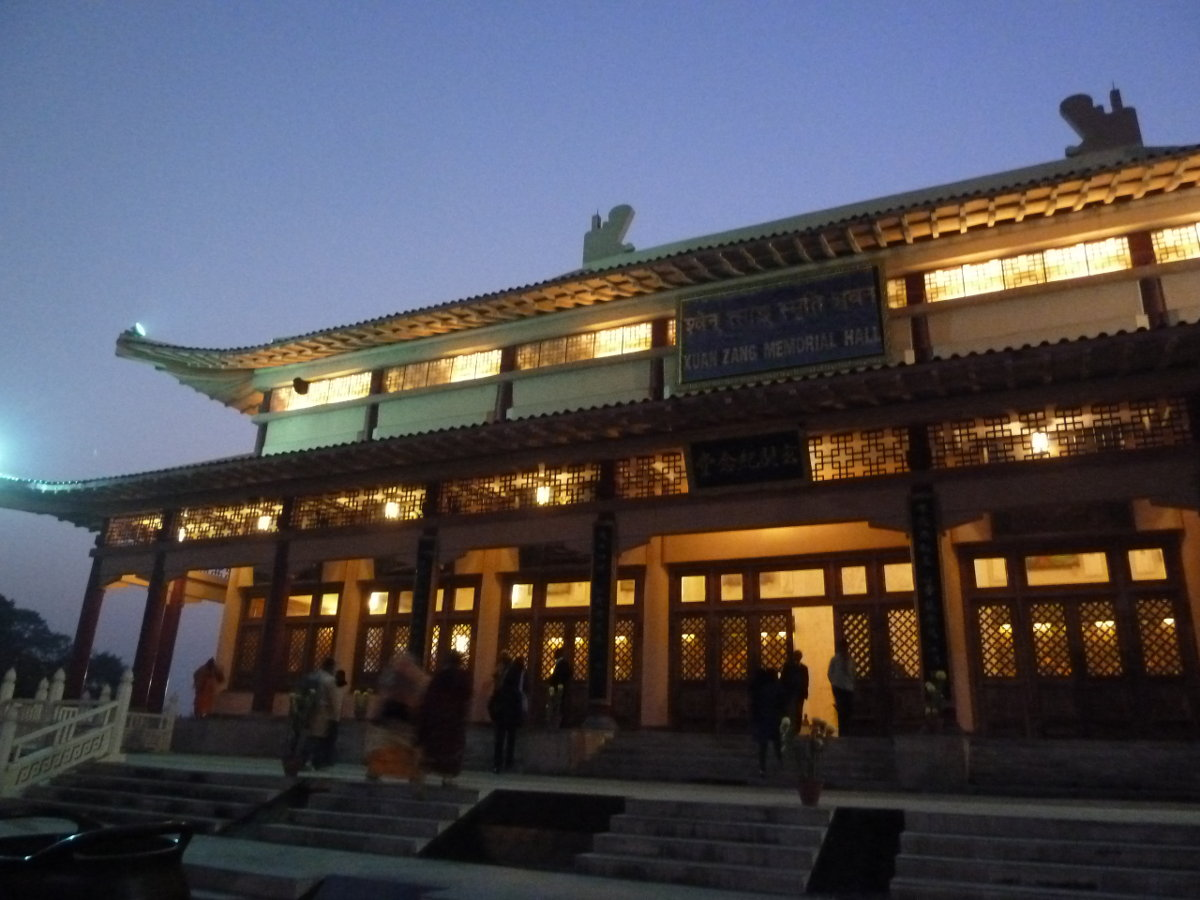
Xuan Zang Memorial Hall

The Xuanzang Memorial Hall is an Indo-Chinese undertaking to honour the famed Buddhist monk and traveller. A relic, comprising a skull bone of the Chinese monk, is on display in the memorial hall.

=== Nalanda Multimedia Museum ===
Another museum adjoining the excavated site is the privately run Nalanda Multimedia Museum. It showcases the history of Nalanda through 3-D animation and other multimedia presentations.

== Portrayals in popular culture ==
- 1970: The song "O Mere Raja" from the Hindi film Johny Mera Naam was shot on location and features many parts of the excavated ruins.
- 2016: The joint Chinese-Indian production film Xuanzang uses shots from the ruins superimposed with CGI imagery to depict Xuanzang's entry into Nalanda Mahavihara and his meeting with the Indian Buddhist monk Śīlabhadra.

== Gallery ==
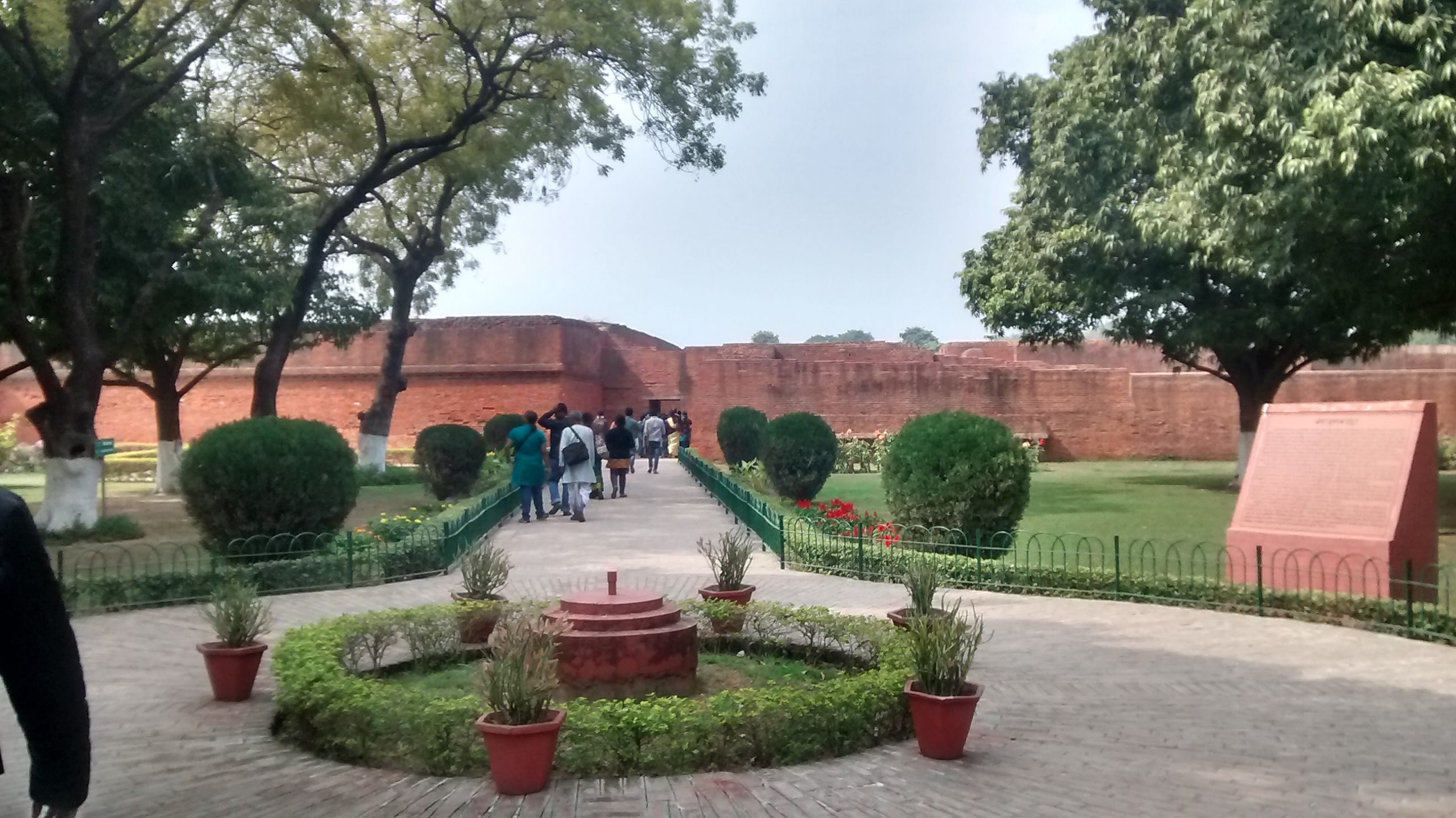
Entrance to the excavated remains

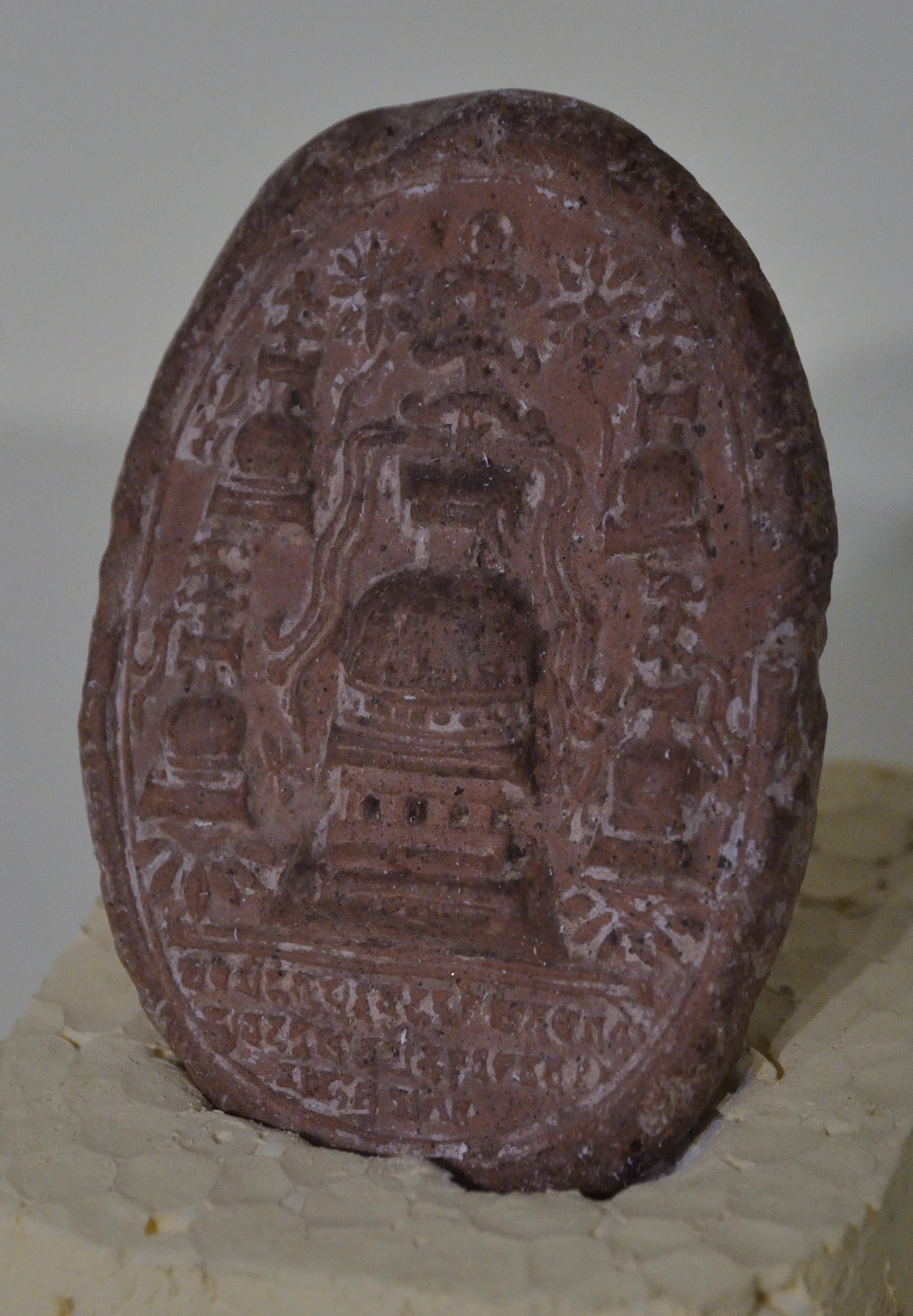
A seal, Gupta period c. 5th–6th century

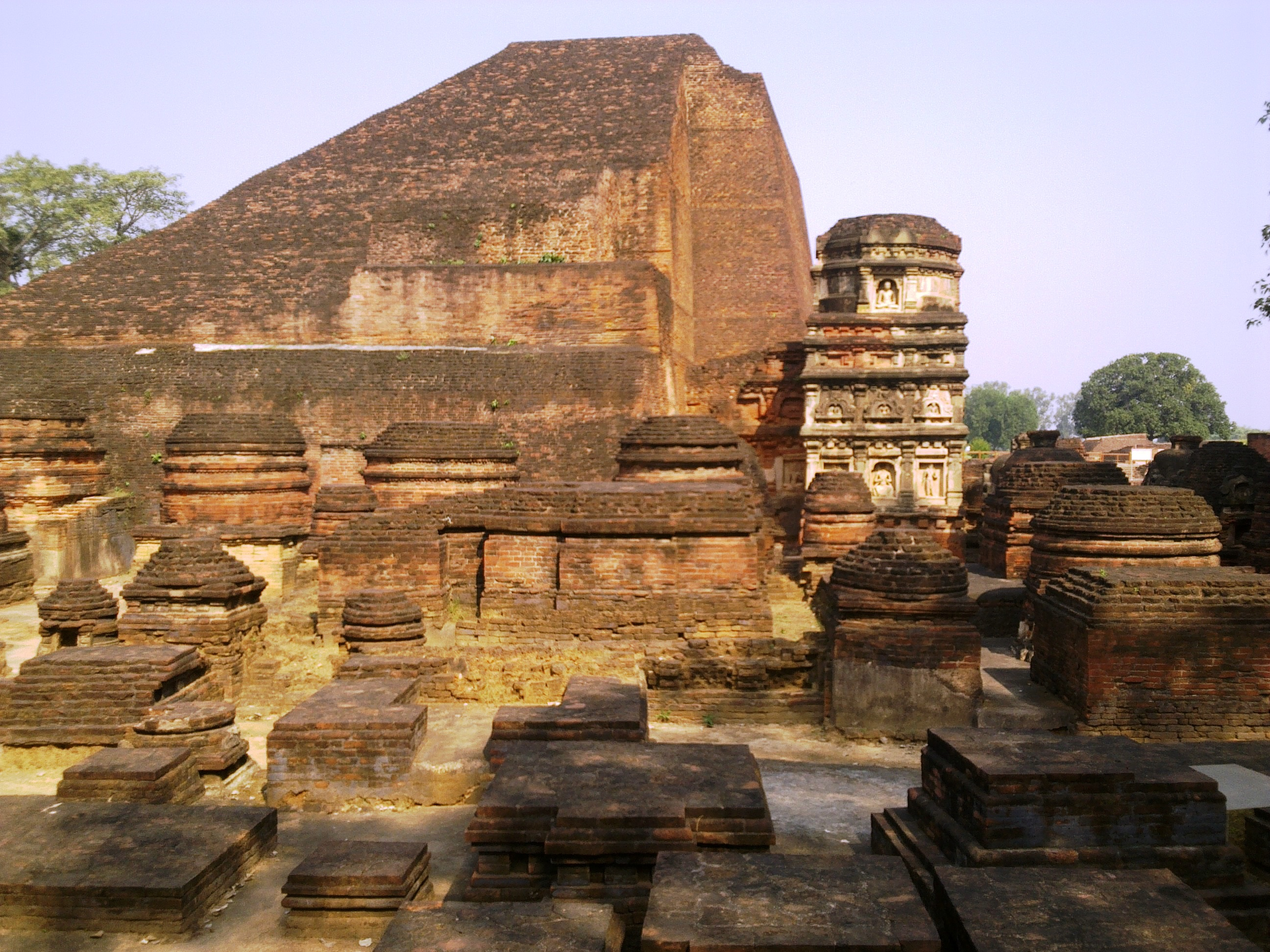
Stupa of Sariputta (Temple 3)

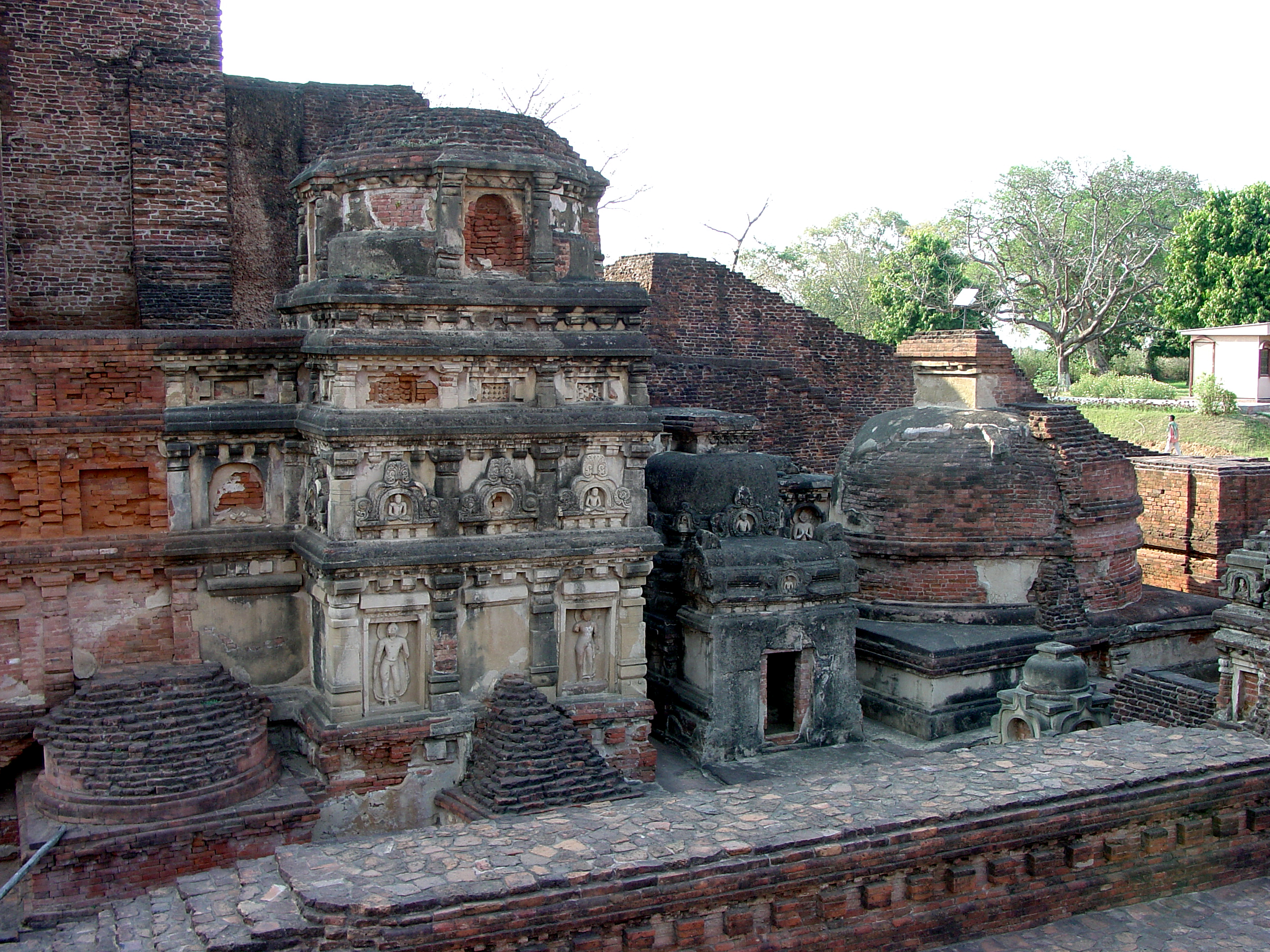
Stupa of Sariputta, secondary shrines

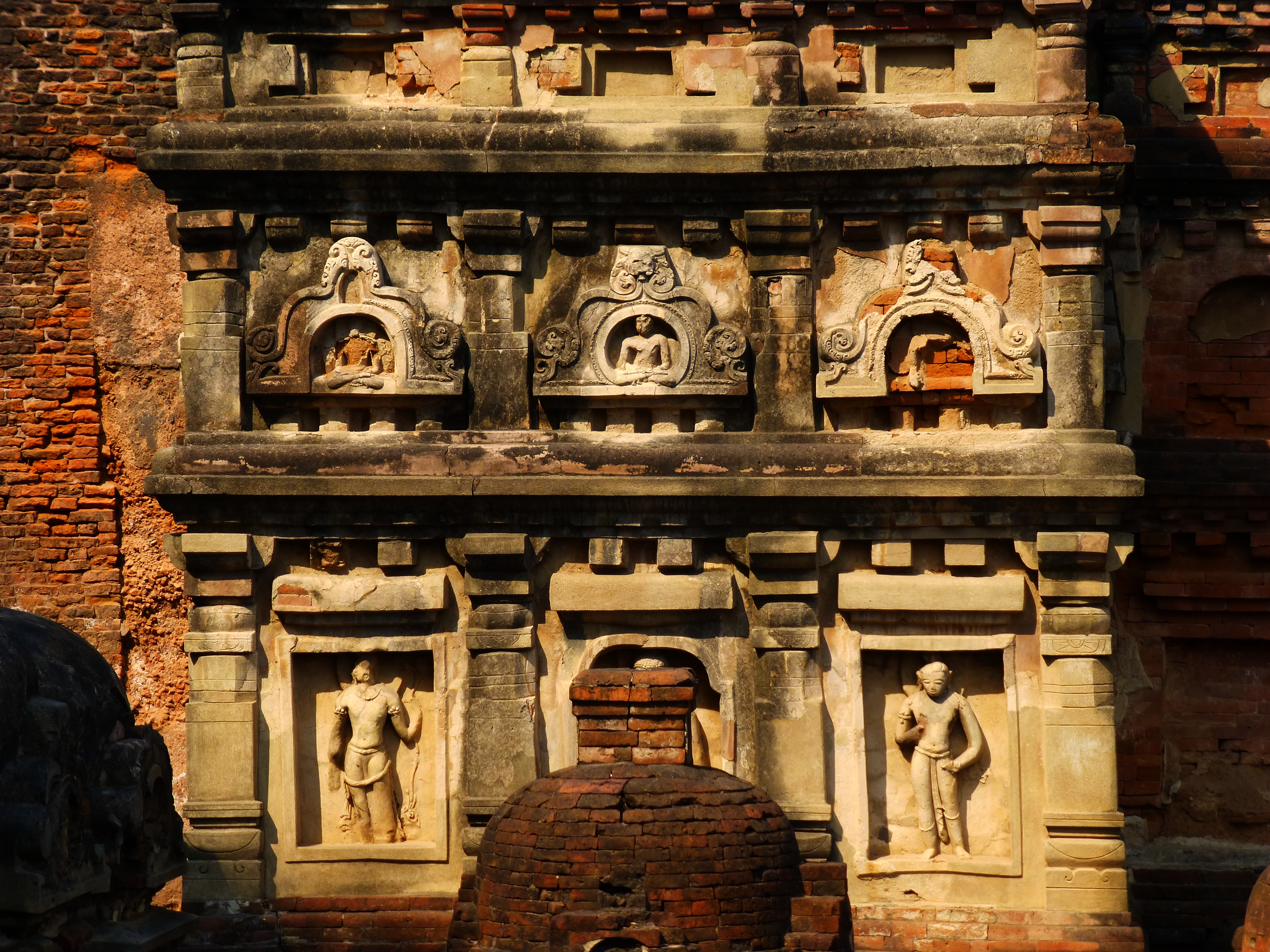
Sculpted stucco panels on a tower, Stupa of Sariputta

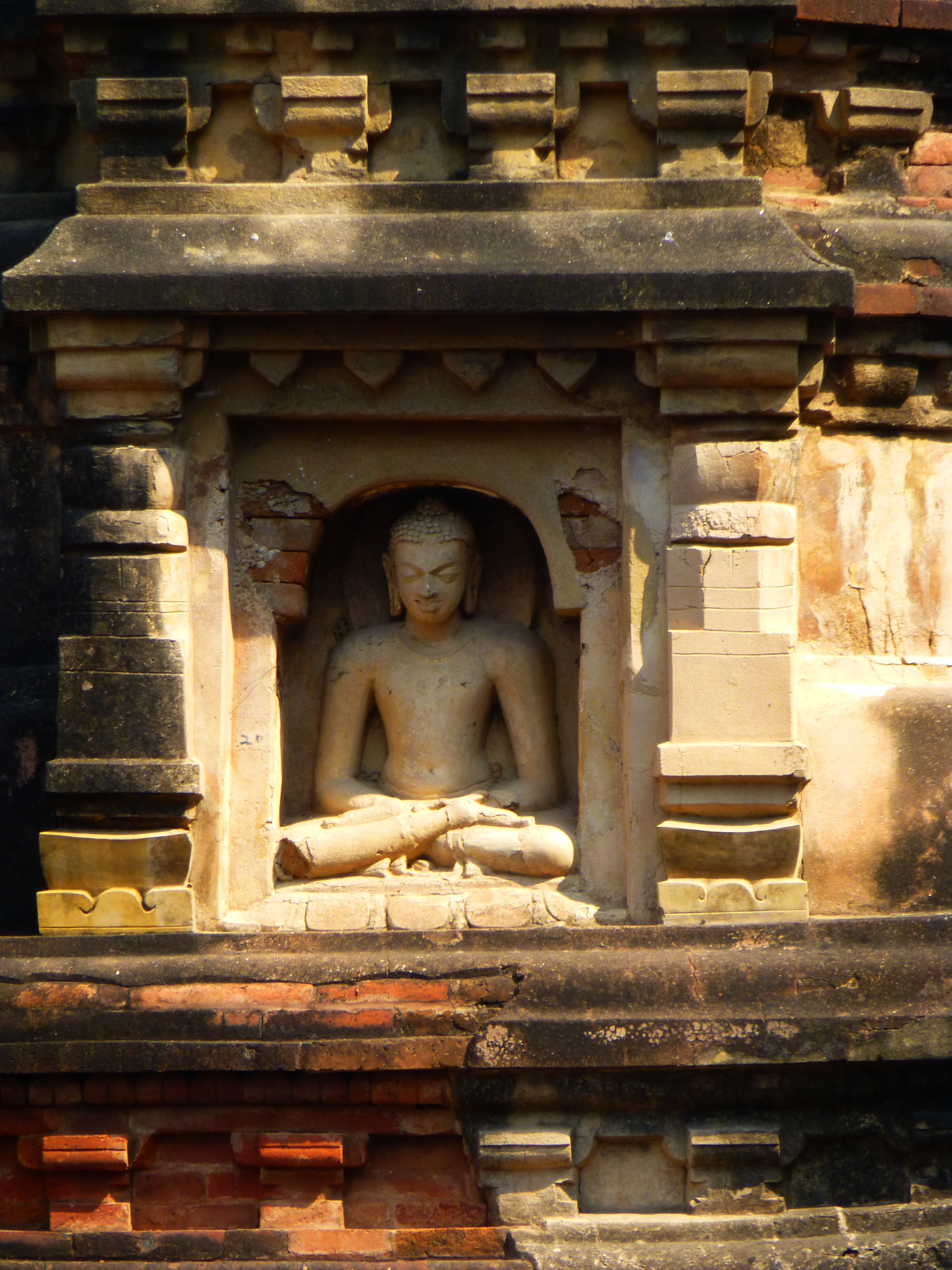
Stucco Buddha image at Nalanda, Stupa of Sariputta

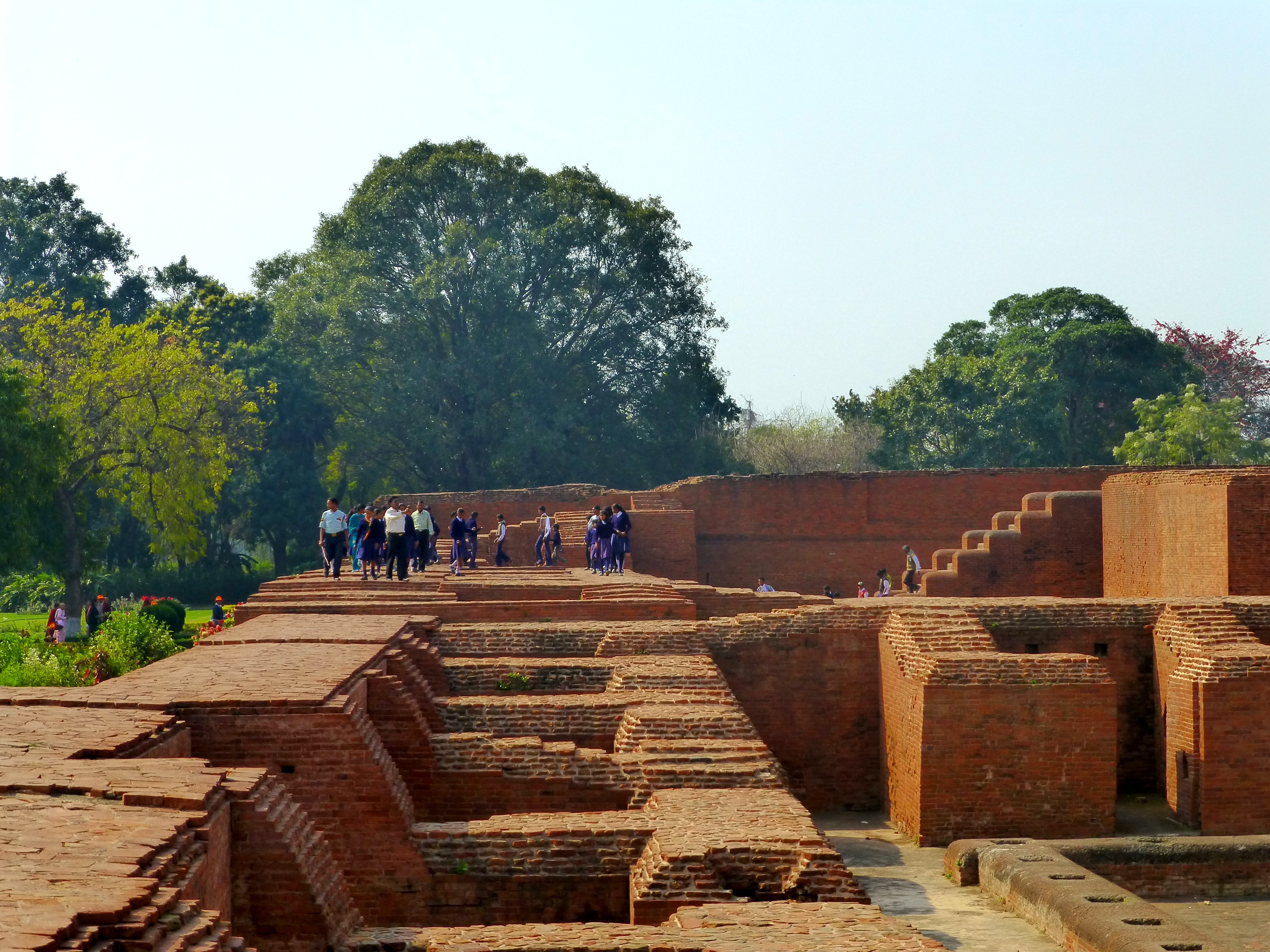
People on second story of an excavated monastery

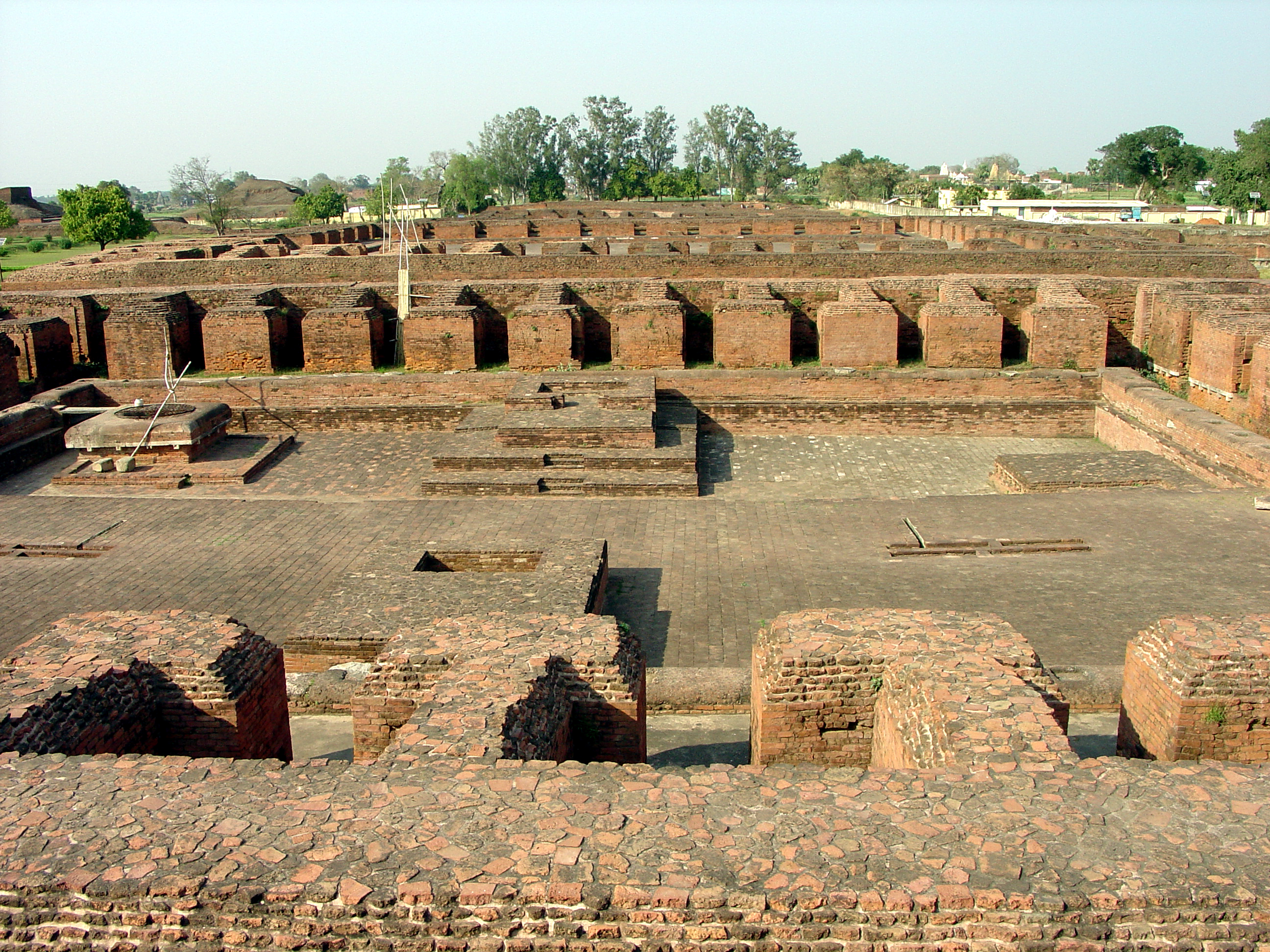
Monastery 4 with well and stepped platform

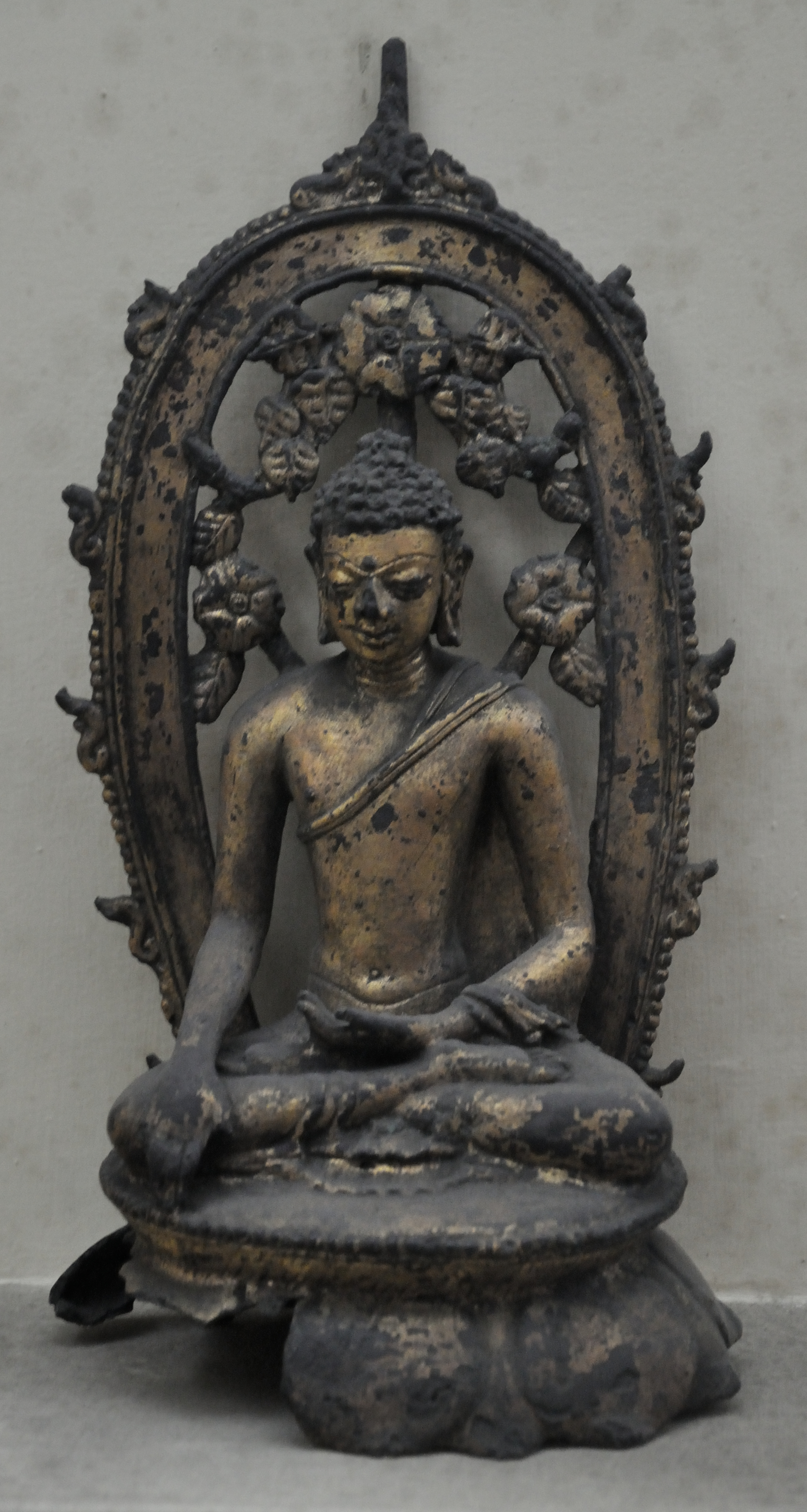
A post-8th century bronze statue of Buddha from Nalanda

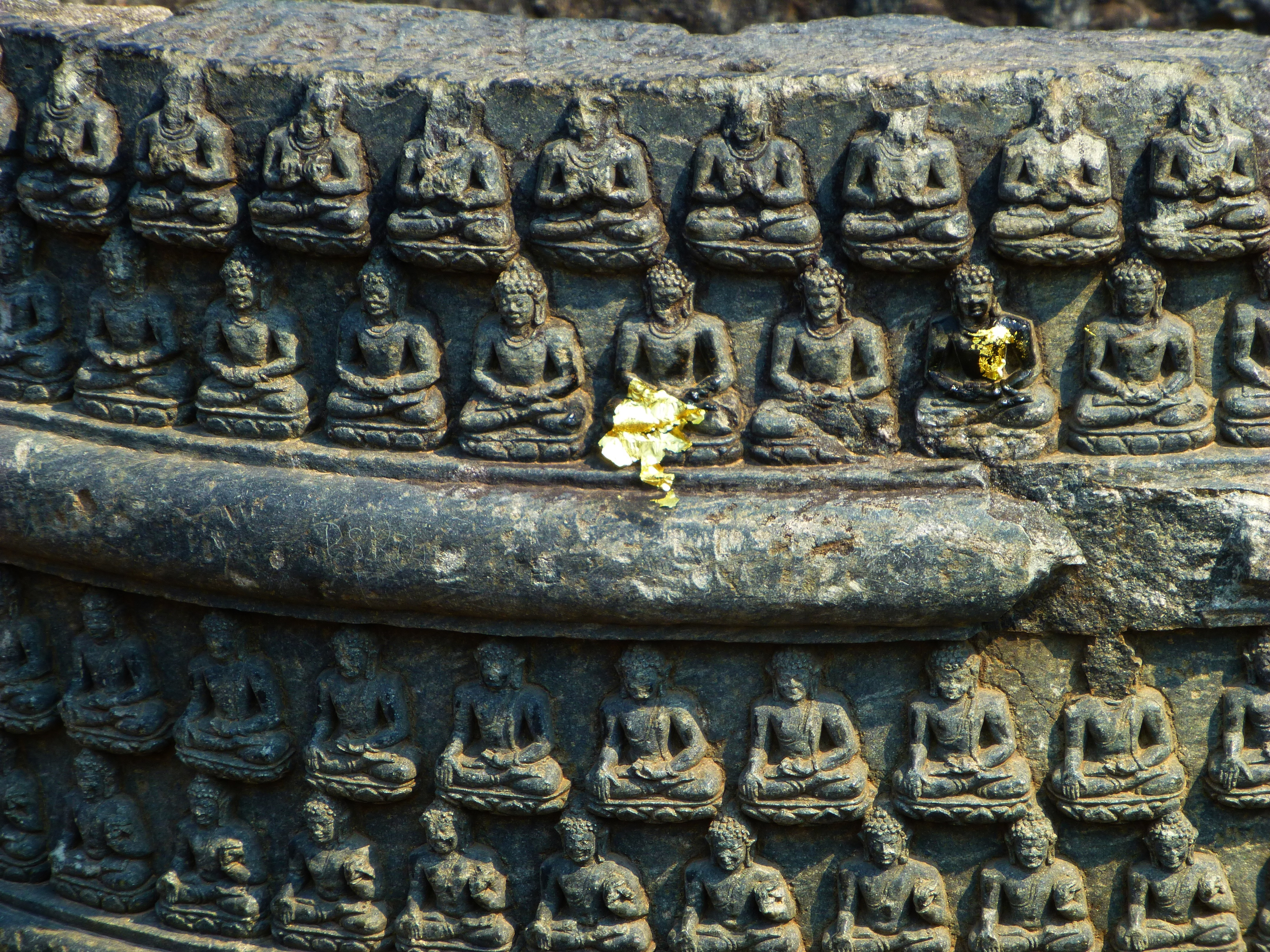
Details on one of numerous votive stupas at the site

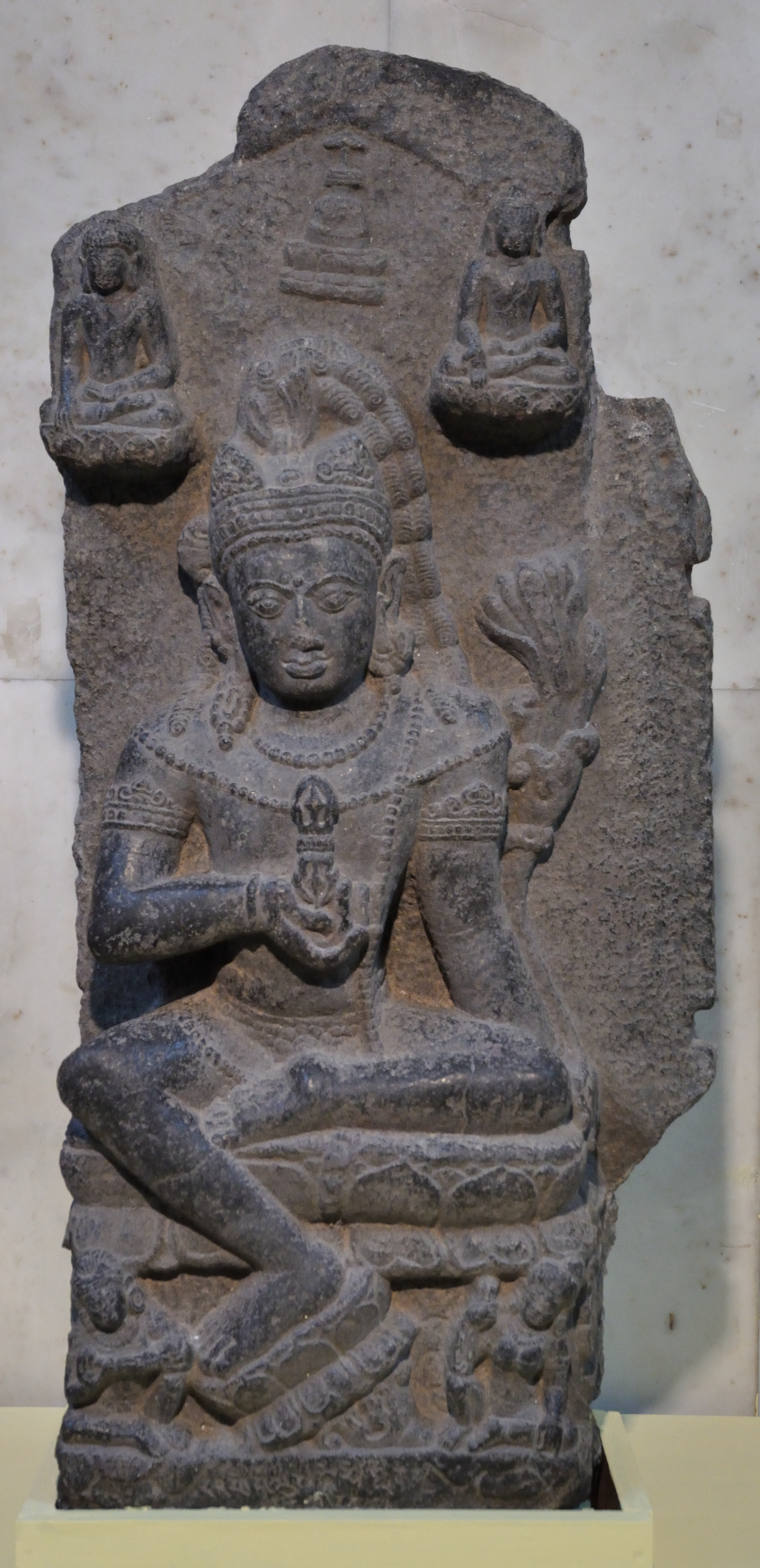
Vajrapani – Basalt circa 8th century CE

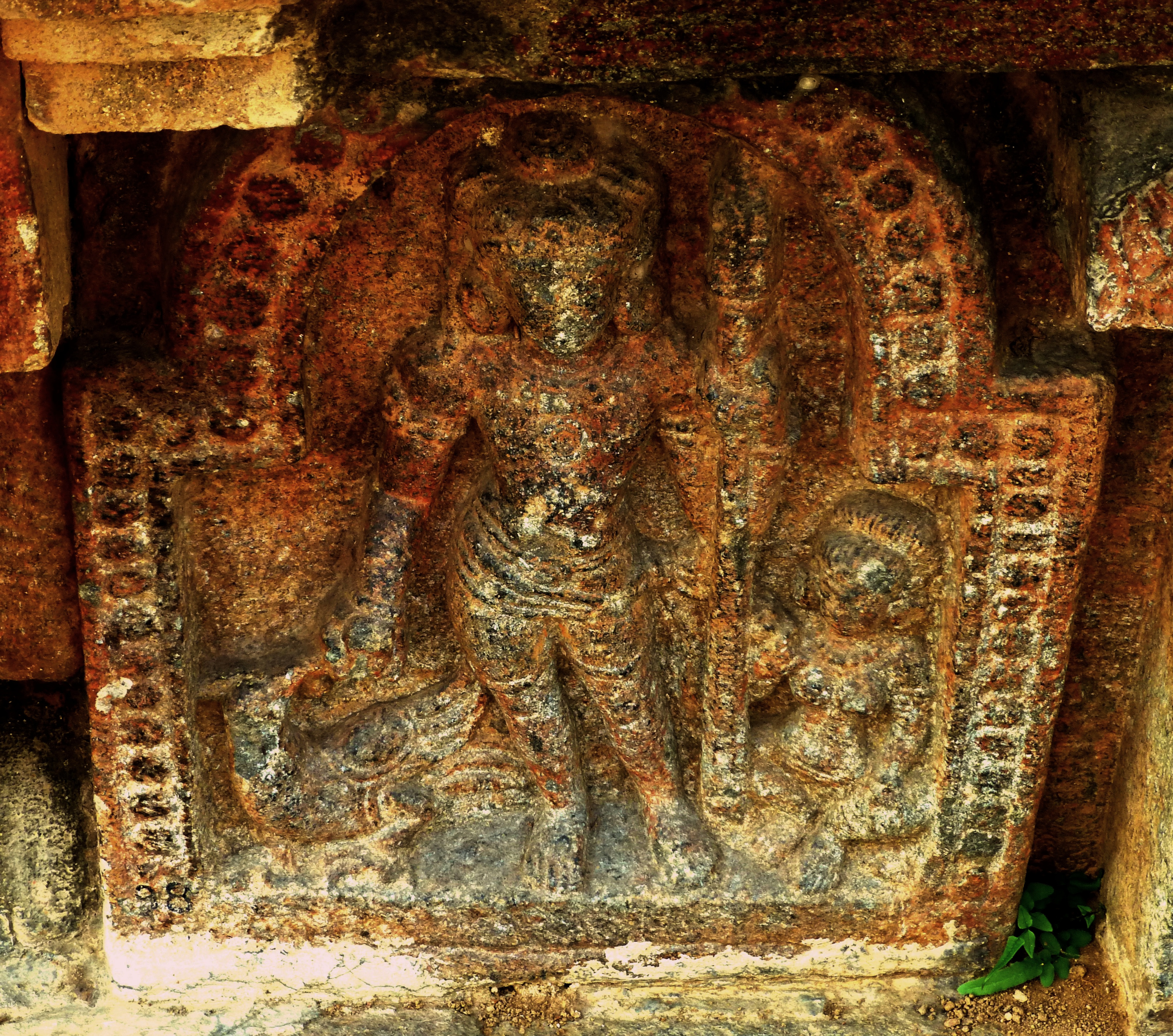
Skanda, Temple 2

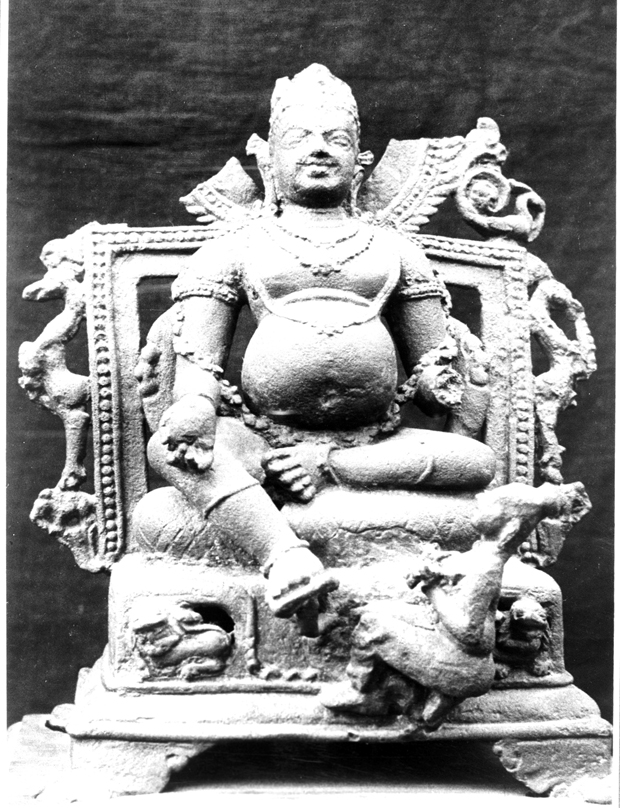
Kubera

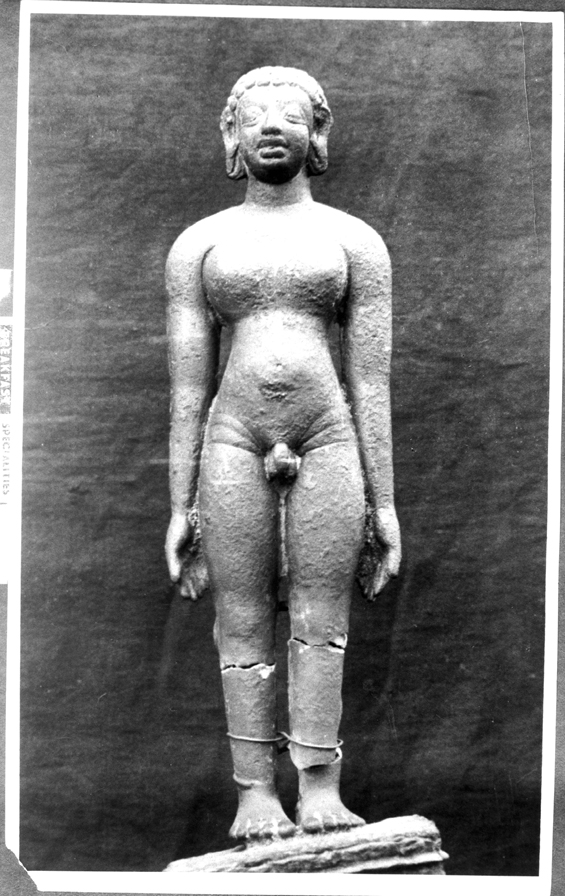
Jain Tirthankara, Bronze, from Nalanda, 10th century

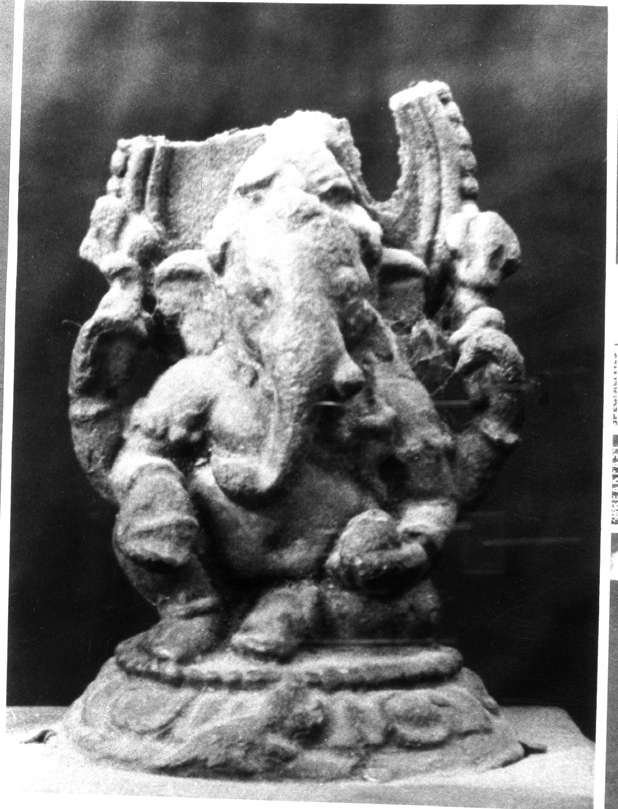
Ganesha, Bronze, from Nalanda, 10th century

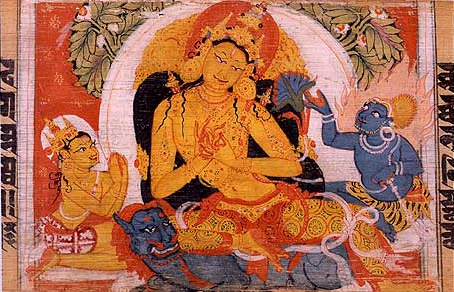
Painting of Manjusri Bodhisattva from the Astasahasrika Prajnaparamita Sutra manuscript written in the Ranjana script. Nalanda, Bihar, India, c. 700-1100 CE

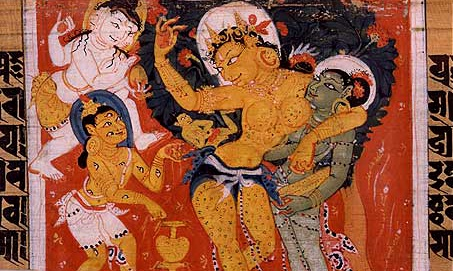
Painting of the miraculous birth of Gautama Buddha, out of the side of Queen Mahamaya from the Astasahasrika Prajnaparamita Sutra manuscript, Pala Period. Nalanda, Bihar, India

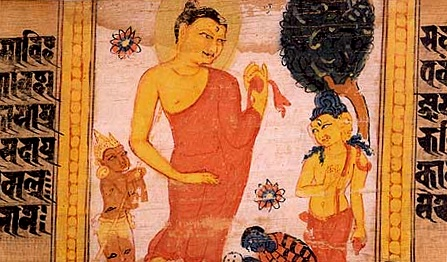
Painting of Gautama Buddha having descended from Triyatrimsa Heaven from the Astasahasrika Prajnaparamita Sutra manuscript, Nalanda, Bihar, India. Circa 700-1100 CE.

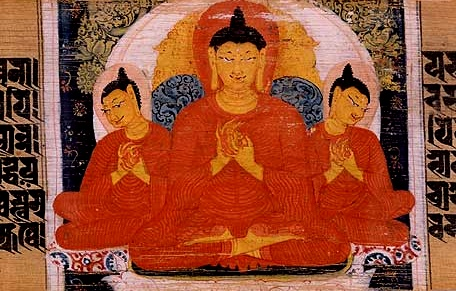
Painting of the Buddha supernaturally multiplying his body, referred to as the miracle at Sravasti. From the Astasahasrika Prajnaparamita Sutra manuscript. Nalanda, Bihar, India. Circa 700-1100 CE.

== See also ==
Related sites and places:

- Telhara – the site of a Buddhist monastery in ancient India

Ancient Indian learning centres:

- Jagaddala, Bengal
- Odantapuri, adjacent to Nalanda
- Pushpagiri Vihara, Odisha
- Sharada Peeth, Kashmir
- Somapura, Bengal
- Taxila, Punjab
- Teladhaka, near Nalanda
- Vallabhi, Gujarat
- Vikramashila, Bihar

Others:

- List of oldest higher-learning institutions
- List of Monuments of National Importance in Bihar
- Kurkihar hoard

== Sources ==
- Asher, Frederick M. (2015). Nalanda: Situating the Great Monastery. Marga. ISBN 978-93-83243-07-5.
- Chandra, Satish (2004). Volume 1 of Medieval India: From Sultanat to the Mughals. Har-Anand Publications. ISBN 978-81-241-1064-5.
- Chos-dar, Upasaka (1959). Biography of Dharmasvamin (Chag Lo Tsa-ba Chos-rje-dpal), a Tibetan Monk Pilgrim. Translated by George Roerich. The account was narrated by Dharmasvamin to his student, Chos-dar.
- Dutt, Sukumar (1962). Buddhist Monks And Monasteries of India: Their History And Contribution To Indian Culture. London: George Allen and Unwin Ltd (Reprinted 1988). ISBN 978-81-208-0498-2.
- Ghosh, Amalananda (1965). A Guide to Nalanda (5 ed.). New Delhi: The Archaeological Survey of India.
- Grousset, Rene (1971) [First published in French in 1929]. In the Footsteps of the Buddha. Translated from French by JA Underwood. Orion Press. ISBN 978-0-7661-9347-5.
- Joshi, Lal Mani (1977). Studies in the Buddhistic Culture of India During the Seventh and Eighth Centuries A.D. Motilal Banarsidass Publications. ISBN 978-81-208-0281-0.
- Krishnan, G.P. (2016). Nalanda, Srivijaya and Beyond: Re-exploring Buddhist Art in Asia. Asian Civilisations Museum, Singapore. ISBN 978-981-09-9912-4.
- Kumar, Pintu (2018). Buddhist Learning in South Asia: Education, Religion, and Culture at the Ancient Sri Nalanda Mahavihara. Lexington Books.
- Minhaj-ud-Din, Maulana (1881). Tabakat-i-Nasiri – A General History of the Muhammadan Dynasties of Asia Including Hindustan. Translated by Major H. G. Raverty. p. 552.
- Pal, Sayantani (2019). "Village Seals of Nalanda". Pratna Samiksha. 10: 95–97.
- Scharfe, Hartmut (2002). Education in Ancient India. Handbook of Oriental Studies. Vol. 16. Brill. ISBN 978-90-04-12556-8.
- Wriggins, Sally Hovey (1996). Xuanzang : a Buddhist pilgrim on the Silk Road. Boulder, Colo.: Westview Press. ISBN 978-0-8133-2801-0.
- Wink, André (2002). Al-Hind: the making of the Indo-Islamic world. Vol. 1 (3rd ed.). Boston, MA: Brill. ISBN 978-0-391-04173-8.
- Khurshid, Anis (January 1972). "Growth of libraries in India". International Library Review. 4 (1): 21–65. doi:10.1016/0020-7837(72)90048-9.
- Sastri, Hiranand (1986) [1942]. Nalanda and its Epigraphic Material. New Delhi: Sri Satguru Publications. ISBN 978-81-7030-013-7.
- Sastri, Kallidaikurichi Aiyah Nilakanta (1988) [1967]. Age of the Nandas and Mauryas (2nd ed.). Motilal Banarsidass Publishers. ISBN 978-81-208-0466-1.
- Taher, Mohamed; Davis, Donald Gordon (1994). Librarianship and library science in India : an outline of historical perspectives. New Delhi: Concept Pub. Co. ISBN 978-81-7022-524-9.
- Bhatt, Rakesh Kumar (1995). History and Development of Libraries in India. Mittal Publications. ISBN 978-81-7099-582-1.
- Mookerji, Radha Kumud (1998) [1951]. Ancient Indian Education: Brahmanical and Buddhist (2 ed.). Motilal Banarsidass Publications. ISBN 978-81-208-0423-4.
- Prasad, Chandra Shekhar (1988). "Nalanda vis-à-vis the Birthplace of Śāriputra". East and West. 38 (1/4): 175–188. JSTOR 29756860.
- Patel, Jashu; Kumar, Krishan (2001). Libraries and Librarianship in India. Greenwood Publishing Group. ISBN 978-0-313-29423-5.
- Collins, Randall (2000). The sociology of philosophies: a global theory of intellectual change. Volume 30, Issue 2 of Philosophy of the social sciences. Harvard University Press. ISBN 978-0-674-00187-9.
- Beal, Samuel (2000) [1911]. The life of Hiuen-Tsiang. Trubner's Oriental Series. Vol. 1 (New ed.). London: Routledge. ISBN 978-1-136-37629-0.
- Humphreys, Christmas (1987). The Wisdom of Buddhism. Psychology Press. ISBN 978-0-7007-0197-1.
- Wayman, Alex (1984). Buddhist Insight: Essays. Motilal Banarsidass. ISBN 978-81-208-0675-7.
- Kulke, Hermann; Rothermund, Dietmar (2004). A History of India (Fourth ed.). Routledge. Archived from the original on 4 October 2014.
- Monroe, Paul (2000). Paul Monroe's encyclopaedia of history of education, Volume 1. Genesis Publishing. ISBN 978-81-7755-091-7.
- Walser, Joseph (2005). Nāgārjuna in Context: Mahāyāna Buddhism and Early Indian Culture. Columbia University Press. ISBN 978-0-231-13164-3.
- Pinkney, Andrea M (2014). "Looking West to India: Asian education, intra-Asian renaissance, and the Nalanda revival". Modern Asian Studies. 49 (1). Cambridge University Press: 111–149. doi:10.1017/s0026749x13000310. S2CID 144865654.
- Le, Huu Phuoc (2010). Buddhist Architecture. Grafikol. pp. 58–66. ISBN 978-0-9844043-0-8.
- Frazier, Jessica, ed. (2011). The Continuum companion to Hindu studies. London: Continuum. ISBN 978-0-8264-9966-0.
- Jarzombek, Mark M.; Prakash, Vikramaditya; Ching, Francis D.K. (2011). A Global History of Architecture. John Wiley & Sons. ISBN 978-0-470-90245-5.
- Buswell, Robert E. Jr.; Lopez, Donald S. Jr. (2013). The Princeton dictionary of Buddhism. Princeton: Princeton University Press. ISBN 978-1-4008-4805-8.
- Kim, Jinah (2013). Receptacle of the Sacred: Illustrated Manuscripts and the Buddhist Book Cult in South Asia. University of California Press. ISBN 978-0-520-27386-3.
- Smith, F Harold (2013). The Buddhist Way of Life. Routledge. ISBN 978-1-135-02930-2.
- Walton, Linda (2015). "Educational institutions" in The Cambridge World History Vol. 5. Cambridge: Cambridge University Press. ISBN 978-0-521-19074-9.
- Kumar, Abhay (2025). Nalanda: How It Changed the World. Penguin Random House. ISBN 9780670099627.
