= Sahaja =

Spontaneous enlightenment in Indian and Tibetan Buddhism

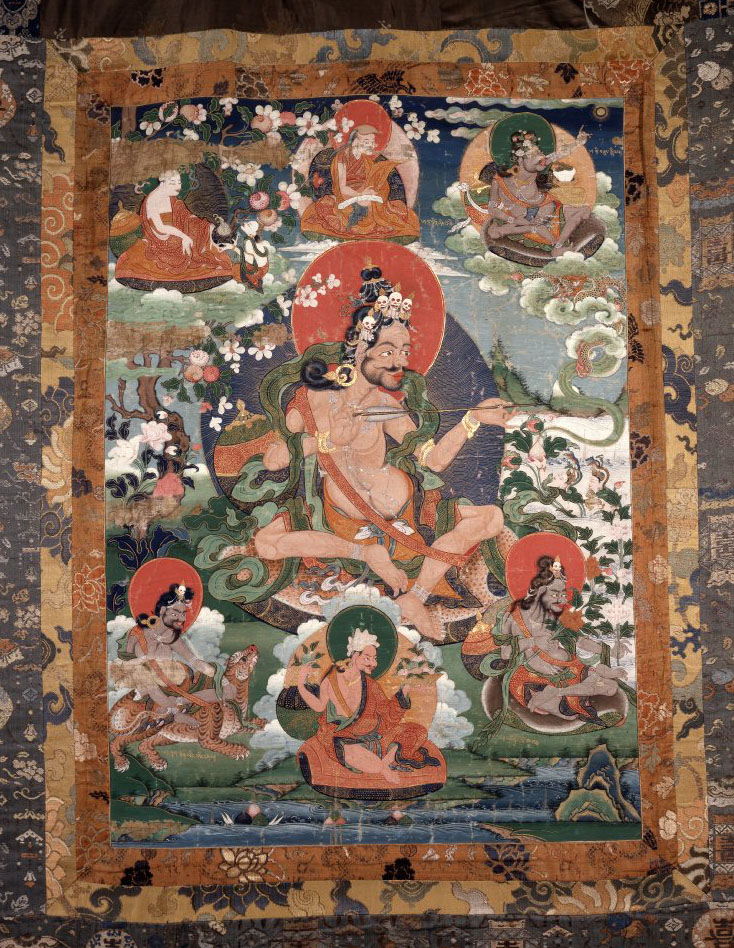
A Tibetan thangka or scroll painting of Saraha surrounded by other mahasiddhas; probably 18th century and now in the British Museum

Sahaja (Prakrit languages: সহজ Sanskrit: सहज sahaja) is spontaneous liberating knowledge in Indian Tantric and Tibetan Buddhist religions. Sahaja practices first arose in Bengal during the 8th century among yogis called Sahajiya siddhas.

Ananda Coomaraswamy describes its significance as "the last achievement of all thought", and "a recognition of the identity of spirit and matter, subject and object", continuing "There is then no sacred or profane, spiritual or sensual, but everything that lives is pure and void."

== Etymology ==
The Sanskrit [and the Tibetan, which precisely follows it] literally means: 'born or produced together or at the same time as. Congenital, innate, hereditary, original, natural (...by birth, by nature, naturally...)'.

Etymologically, saḥ- means 'together with', and ja derives from the root jan, meaning 'to be born, produced, to occur, to happen'. The Tibetan lhan cig tu skye ba is an exact etymological equivalent of the Sanskrit. Lhan cig means 'together with', and skye ba means 'to be born, to arise, to come about, to be produced'. The Tibetan can function as a verbal phrase, noun, or adjective.

== Origins ==
According to Davidson,

... sahaja was a preclassical word that became employed in scholastic, particularly Yogacara, literature as an adjective describing conditions natural or, less frequently, essential with respect to circumstances encountered in an embodied state.

== Sahajayana ==
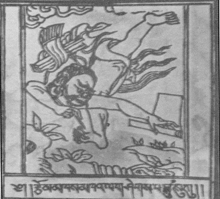
A sketch of Siddhacharya poet Kanhapada

The siddha Saraha (8th century CE) was the key figure of the Vajrayana Buddhist Sahajayana movement, which flourished in Bengal and Odisha.

Sahajiya mahasiddhas (great adepts or yogis) like Saraha, Kanha, Savari, Luipāda, Kukkuripāda, Kānhapāda and Bhusukupāda were tantric Buddhists who expounded their beliefs in songs and dohas in the Apabhraṃśa languages and Bengali.

Many of the songs in this tradition are preserved in the Charyapada, a work of Buddhist tantric songs in the Abahaṭ‌ṭha languages written between the 8th and 12th centuries.

The songs were often sung in tantric feasts called ganachakras which included dance, music and improvised songs or poems called caryagiti.

Sahajiyas such as Saraha also believed that enlightenment could be achieved in this lifetime, by laypersons living in samsara. The sahajiyas also practiced a form of tantric sex which was supposed to bring the female and male elements together in balance.

Saraha and his disciples were also master practitioners of Mahamudra meditation, and Saraha composed a famous Mahamudra meditation text along with his 'Three Cycles of Doha', a series of yogic songs. Sahajayana Buddhism became very popular in the Pala Empire, especially among commoners.

One of the classic texts associated with the Sahajiya Buddhists is the Hevajra Tantra. The tantra describes four kinds of Joy (ecstasy):

From Joy there is some bliss, from Perfect Joy yet more. From the Joy of Cessation comes a passionless state. The Joy of Sahaja is finality. The first comes by desire for contact, the second by desire for bliss, the third from the passing of passion, and by this means the fourth [Sahaja] is realized. Perfect Joy is samsara [mystic union]. The Joy of Cessation is nirvana. Then there is a plain Joy between the two. Sahaja is free of them all. For there is neither desire nor absence of desire, nor a middle to be obtained.

The siddha, Indrabhuti, wrote a commentary on Sahaja teachings called the Sahajasiddhipaddhati.

== In the Nāth tradition ==
Sahaja is one of the four keywords of the Nath sampradaya along with Svecchachara, Sama, and Samarasa. Sahaja meditation and worship was prevalent in Tantric traditions common to Hinduism and Buddhism in Bengal as early as the 8th–9th centuries. The British Nath teacher Mahendranath wrote:

Man is born with an instinct for naturalness. He has never forgotten the days of his primordial perfection, except insomuch as the memory became buried under the artificial superstructure of civilization and its artificial concepts. Sahaja means natural... The tree grows according to Sahaja, natural and spontaneous in complete conformity with the Natural Law of the Universe. Nobody tells it what to do or how to grow. It has no swadharma or rules, duties and obligations incurred by birth. It has only svabhava - its own inborn self or essence - to guide it. Sahaja is that nature which, when established in oneself, brings the state of absolute freedom and peace.

The concept of a spontaneous spirituality entered Hinduism with Nath yogis such as Gorakhanath and was often alluded to indirectly and symbolically in the twilight language (sandhya bhasa) common to sahaja traditions as found in the Charyapada and works by Matsyendranath and Daripada. It influenced the bhakti movement through the Sant tradition, exemplified by the Bauls of Bengal, NamdevDnyaneshwar, Meera, Kabir and Guru Nanak, the founder of Sikhism.

Yoga in particular had a quickening influence on the various Sahajiya traditions The culture of the body (kāya-sādhana) through processes of Haṭha-yoga was of paramount importance in the Nāth sect and found in all sahaja schools. Whether conceived of as 'supreme bliss' (Mahā-sukha), as by the Buddhist Sahajiyās, or as 'supreme love' (as with the Vaiṣṇava Sahajiyās), strength of the body was deemed necessary to stand such a supreme realisation.

== Vaishnava-Sahajiya ==
The Vaishnava-Sahajiya sect became popular in 17th century Bengal. It sought religious experience through the five senses. The divine relationship between Krishna and Radha (guises of the divine masculine and divine feminine) had been celebrated by Chandidas (Bangla: চন্ডীদাস) (born 1408 CE), Jayadeva (circa 1200 CE) and Vidyapati (c 1352 - c 1448) whose works foreshadowed the rasas or "flavours" of love. The two aspects of absolute reality were explained as the eternal enjoyer and the enjoyed, Kṛṣṇa and Rādhā, as may be realised through a process of attribution (Aropa), in which the Rasa of a human couple is transmuted into the divine love between Kṛṣṇa and Rādhā, leading to the highest spiritual realisation, the state of union or Yugala. The element of love, the innovation of the Vaiṣṇava Sahajiyā school, "is essentially based on the element of yoga in the form of physical and psychological discipline".

Vaisnava-Sahajiya is a synthesis and complex of traditions that, due to its tantric practices, was perceived with disdain by other religious communities and much of the time was forced to operate in secrecy. Its literature employed an encrypted and enigmatic style. Because of the necessity of privacy and secrecy, little is definitively known about their prevalence or practices.

== Sahaja-siddhi ==
The sahaja-siddhi or the siddhi or 'natural accomplishment' or the 'accomplishment of the unconditioned natural state' was also a textual work, the Sahaja-Siddhi revealed by Dombi Heruka (Skt. Ḍombi Heruka or Ḍombipa) one of the eighty-four Mahasiddhas. The following quotation identifies the relationship of the 'mental flux' (mindstream) to the sahaja-siddhi. Moreover, it must be remembered that though Sundararajan and Mukerji (2003: p. 502) use a masculine pronominal the term siddha is not gender-specific and that there were females, many as senior sadhakas, amongst the siddha communities:

The practitioner is now a siddha, a realized soul. He becomes invulnerable, beyond all dangers, when all forms melt away into the Formless, "when surati merges in nirati, japa is lost in ajapā" (Sākhī, Parcā ko Aṅga, d.23). The meeting of surati and nirati is one of the signs of sahaja-siddhi; surati is an act of will even when the practitioner struggles to disengage himself from worldly attachments. But when his worldliness is totally destroyed with the dissolution of the ego, there is nirati, cessation of the mental flux, which implies cessation of all willed efforts. Nirati (ni-rati) is also cessation of attractions, since the object of attraction and the seeker are now one. In terms of layayoga, nirati is dissolution of the mind in "Sound," nāda.

== Ramana Maharshi ==
Ramana Maharshi distinguished between kevala nirvikalpa samadhi and sahaja nirvikalpa samadhi: (Note: David Godman, 'I' and 'I-I' - A Reader's Query) (Note: What is Liberation According to the Teachings of Sri Ramana Maharshi?)

Sahaja samadhi is a state in which the silent awareness of the subject is operant along with (simultaneously with) the full use of the human faculties.

Kevala nirvikalpa samadhi is temporary, whereas sahaja nirvikalpa samadhi is a continuous state throughout daily activity. This state seems inherently more complex than samadhi, since it involves several aspects of life, namely external activity, internal quietude, and the relation between them. It also seems to be a more advanced state, since it comes after the mastering of samadhi. (Note: Compare the Ten Bulls from Zen) (Note: See also Mouni Sadhu (2005), Meditation: An Outline for Practical Study, pg. 92-93)

== See also ==
- Wu wei
- Samadhi
- Turiya
- Sambalpur
- Balasore
- Ziran
- Mahamudra
- Shikantaza
- Ten bulls
- Five ranks

== Sources ==
Printed sources

- Arora, R.K. The Sacred Scripture (New Delhi: Harman, 1988), chapter 6: Sahaja
- Dasgupta, Shashibhushan (1962) [First published 1946]. Obscure Religious Cults. Calcutta: Firma KLM. OCLC 534995.
- Davidson, Ronald M. (2002). "Reframing Sahaja: genre, representation, ritual and lineage". Journal of Indian Philosophy. 30: 45–83. doi:10.1023/A:1014563830752.
- Dimock, Edward C. Jr. "The Place of the Hidden Moon - Erotic Mysticism in the Vaiṣṇava-sahajiyā Cult of Bengal, University of Chicago Press, 1966
- Feuerstein, George (1978) [1975]. Handboek voor Yoga [Textbook of Yoga]. Ankh-Hermes.
- Forman, Robert K.C. (1999), Mysticism, Mind, Consciousness, SUNY Press
- Kvaerne, Per. "On the Concept of Sahaja in Indian Buddhist Tantric Literature", Temenos, vol.11, 1975, pp88-135
- Mahendranath, Shri Gurudev. Ecstasy, Equipoise, and Eternity. Retrieved Oct. 20, 2004.
- Mahendranath, Shri Gurudev. The Pathless Path to Immortality. Retrieved Oct. 20, 2004.
- Neki, J.S. "Sahaja: an Indian ideal of mental health", Psychiatry, vol.38, 1975, pp1–10
- Ray, Niharranjan. "The Concept of Sahaj in Guru Nanak's Theology and its Antecedents", in Medieval Bhakti Movements in India, edited by N.N.Bhattacharyya (New Delhi: Munshiram Manoharlal, 1969), pp17–35

Web-sources
