= Luipada =

10th-century Pala siddhacharya

Luipa
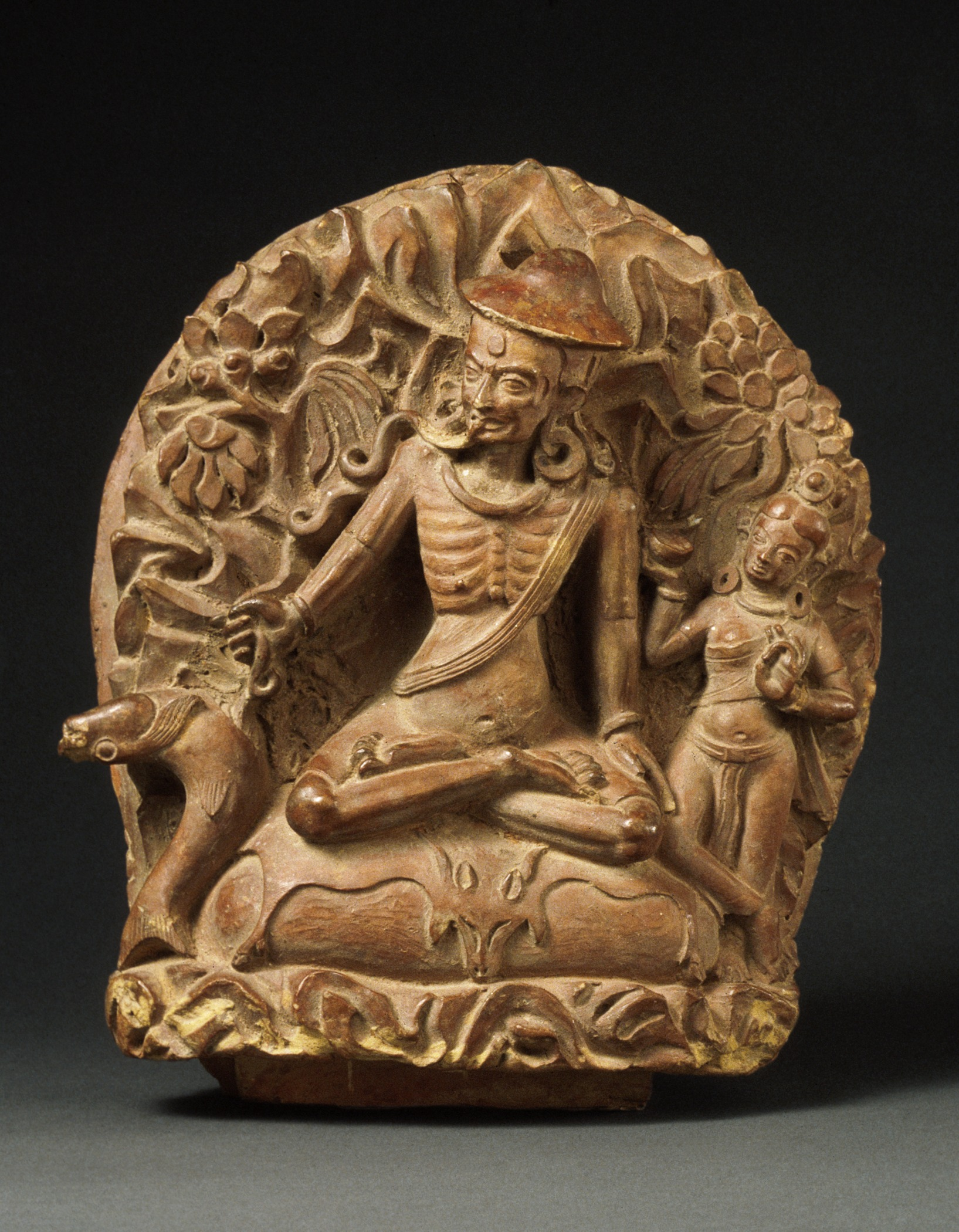
- Other name: Lauhityapada
- Occupation: Litterateur
- Known for: Charyapada

Luipa or Luipada (c. 10th century) was a mahasiddha siddhacharya from Pala Empire (Present day Eastern India and Bangladesh). He was a Buddhist saint from the Kayastha community. He was a writer of a number of Buddhist texts and one of the early poets of Charyapada, a late Apabhraṃśa collection of poems.

== Nomenclature and etymology ==
Although the Tibetan translation for Lui is "the fish-gut eater" (Wylie: nya lto zhabs), the root of the word is probably Sanskrit lohita which means "red" and the names like Luidhar, Luichandra and Luiya mentioned in the Dharmamangals of the late medieval period originated from the same root.

Ayyappapanicker & Akademi (1997: p. 599) amplify the view of prior scholarship in that the nomenclature "Luipa" is related to the Brahmaputra River:

Several scholars, such as K. L. Barua and Dimbeswar Neog, hold the view that his poetic name is reminiscent of his earlier days spent on the bank of the Luit, i.e. the Brahmaputra. His vocabulary and diction are clearly old Assamese."

== Hagiographical accounts ==
Luipa appears in The Legends of Eighty-four Siddhas (Wylie: grub thob brgyad bcu tsa bzhi'i lo rgyus), a Tibetan namtar detailing the lives of Indian mahasiddhas. It was written by the Tibetan monk Mondup Sherab and was probably a translation of the Chaturashiti-Siddha-Pravritti, based on what was narrated to him by Abhayadatta Sri of Champaran (c. 12th century). In the Chaturasiti-Siddha-Pravritti, Luipa is said to be the second son of a very rich king of Singhaladvipa, believed to be Sri Lanka. However, several other regions were also known as Singhaladvipa, and one of them was Oddiyana, which other sources mentioned as the place of birth of Luipa.

Luipa's father chose him as his successor, but he left his kingdom to achieve bodhi, i.e. enlightenment. Luipa first headed for Ramesvaram and then went to Vajrasana, known today as Bodh Gaya, the place where Gautama Buddha achieved enlightenment. There Luipa received his first teaching from a dakini. Later, when he reached Saliputra, or Magadha, a Loka-Dakini advised him to get rid of the slightest pride of his royal blood to achieve enlightenment by leaving aside all prejudices regarding the purity of foods. Following her advice, Luipa consumed only the guts of the fishes thrown away by the fishermen on the Ganges for twelve years. This practice led to him being known as Lui, one who eats fish-guts.

Luipa also appears in the Chaturashiti-Siiddha-Pravritti, where he meets the king of Magadha, Indrapala and his Brahmin minister. These two became his disciples and were known as Darikapa and Dengipa. Luipa initiated them into the mandala of Cakrasaṃvara.

In Buton Rinchen Drub's History of Buddhism (Wylie: chos-'byung), Luipa is mentioned as the son of King Lalitachandra of Oddiyana. When the prince met Śabara, a disciple of Saraha, he was immensely impressed by this great adept and begged him for instruction. He received initiation into the tantra of Cakrasaṃvara. The initial part of his penance was completed when he joined a circle of twenty-four Dakas and Dakinis in a ganachakra in a charnel ground which climaxed in consumption of the corpse of a sage. With a final blessing from his Guru he left Oddiyana and became a mendicant sage. The period ended when, feeling the need for sustained one-pointed meditation practice, he sat down to meditate beside a pile of fish-guts by the banks of the River Ganges in Bengal, where he remained till he had attained mahamudra-siddhi, the highest level of spiritual attainment in Vajrayana Buddhism.

The Sakya school of Tibetan Buddhism records that Luipa was a kayastha or scribe by occupation, at the court of Dharmapala, the emperor of Varendra in northern Bengal. While begging for alms at Dharmapala's palace Savaripa recognized the scribe Luipa as a suitable recipient for his Samvara lineage; his extraordinary talent was evident in the versified letters he wrote to the king's correspondents, a task requiring a pointed concentration.

The account of Luipa found in the work of Taranatha, a scholar from the Jonang school of Tibetan Buddhism, differs significantly from that found in Buton's work. Here, Luipa was a scribe to the King of Oddiyana and was initiated into the Vajravārāhī mandala.

== Poetry of Luipa rendered into English ==
The following poetic extract of Luipa is from his work, Kāā Tarubara, the first pada of the Charyapada (c. 9-10th century) and rendered into English by Mahendra Bora and cited in Ayyappapanicker & Akademi (1997: p. 599):

The body is a gentle tree with its branches five in number,
Into the stuff of unsteady mind enters Time the wrecker.
Get your mind steadied and enjoy the bliss never-waning,
Lui counsels, know it from your teacher just by asking:
Why all these modes of meditation one should toil and try,
When going through joy and sorrow all must one day die?
Ignoring this bond of deception, trust in sense-perception,
Riding on the wings of pure void, make her your companion.
Lui testifies, I have seen her clear in my meditation,
Seated on twin mats doing inhalation and exhalation.

It is also notable to refer here that Luipa has also contributed to the 29th song/Raga/Hymn of the Charyapada, the first discovered manuscript of Bangla Literature. This song is reads:-

Where is it and where is it not that entity;
Who is here to be pleased with this duality?
The truth is really far to find
The feelings like senses can never bind.
That is non-perceived by colored forms and signs
The Vedas and Agamas trace only in blind.
The moon reflected in the water
Perceives as true even mirage for sure.
What is for me to think as astray
The life I lead in transcendental gay?

== Date of Luipa ==
The most significant information available from the legends of the Sakya school is that Luipa worked at the court of the Maharaja of Gauda, Dharmapala. If this king is same as Pala Emperor Dharmapala, then this identification places Luipa as a younger contemporary of Dharmapala (770 – 810 CE). If Luipa was initiated in his youth, his date of initiation must be at the end of the eighth century or the beginning of the ninth century.

In the Abhisamaya-Vibhanga of the Tengyur, Atiśa is mentioned as a co-author of the text along with him but it seems that actually Atisha had either completed his text or wrote a Vibhanga (commentary) on his Abhisamaya. So, it is more probable that he belonged to the 10th century.

From Luipa's date, his guru Śabara's time can be fixed, along with the dates of his disciples Darikapa and Dengipa, and also Dombi Heruka, whom Luipa taught. Since Kilapa was probably one of his descendants, his date can also be fixed.

== Identification with Minapa/Matsyendranath ==
Some scholars like Prabodh Chandra Bagchi have identified Luipa with Matsyendranath, the adiguru and the founder of the Nath Sampradaya. There are several similarities between them. Both of their names Lui and Mina mean fish. In Sri Lanka and eastern India both of them were originators of yogini-tantra lineages (Luipa Samvara and Minapa Yogini-kaula). While Luipa was considered as adisiddha, Matsyendranath was known as adiguru. Whereas other scholars like Rajmohan Nath considered Luipa and Matsyendra to be different persons.

== Adi-Siddha ==
The Chaturashiti-Siddha-Pravritti begins with the legend of Luipa. This may be a reflection of the belief prevalent during the period of the narrator or the translator, that Luipa was the first siddha (adi-siddha) in terms of either time or status. The first Pada of the Charyapada was also attributed to Luipa and in its commentary in Sanskrit, Munidatta mentions him as the Adisiddhacharya. It is also an indicator of the contemporary belief. But some modern scholars like Rahul Sankrityayan claimed Saraha as adi-siddha. Luipa was definitely born after Saraha, since Luipa's teacher Savaripa was Saraha's disciple, but their lifetimes probably overlapped. Both Saraha and Luipa were originators of Samvara-tantra lineages, but it was Luipa who received the title of Guhyapati (Master of Secrets) in addition to his status of adi-siddha in the lineage that practiced the Samvara-tantra according to the method of Luipa. He received direct transmission from the Dakini Vajravarahi. If Luipa obtained his original Samvara revelation in Oddiyana, the home of several of the wisdom (mother) tantras, he probably was one of the siddhas responsible for propagating this tantra in Eastern India. But whatever the tantra's provenance, Luipa became the great exemplar of Saraha's preachings, as confirmed in the Padas assigned to him in Charyagītikosha, and his sadhana (practice) became the inspiration and example for some of the most respected names amongst the siddhas, Kambalapa, Ghantapa, Indrabhuti, Jalandharipa, Kanhapa (Krishnacharya), Tilopa and Naropa all of whom initiated into the Chakrasamvara-tantra according to the method of Luipa. Sakya tradition maintains that, three principal Guru Sampradaya (lineages of teachers) of the practice of Chakrasamvara-tantra are of Luipa, Ghantapa and Naropa. Marpa Dopa transmitted this tantra to Tibet, where it has continued as the principal yidam sadhana (practice) of the Kagyu school till date. Luipad was well versed (siddha) in Aghori tantra.

== Major literary works ==
In the Bstan-'gyur, he has been mentioned as the author of the texts, the Shribhagavad-Abhisamaya, the Vajrasattva Sadhana, the Tattvasvabhava-Dohakosha-Gitikia-Drishti-Nama, the Luhipada-Gitika, the Shrichakrasamvara-Abhisamaya-Tika and the Buddhodaya. He was also mentioned as the co-author of the Abhisamaya-Vibhanga along with the great scholar Atisha. The Padas 1 and 29 of the Charyagītikosha (or the Charyapada) are also ascribed to him.
