= Dadar (disambiguation) =

Dadar is a neighbourhood in Mumbai, India.

Dadar may also refer to:

- Dadar railway station, Mumbai, India
- Dadar, Raigad district, Maharashtra, India
- Dadar (ritual tool), an arrow like tool

== See also ==
- Dadra (disambiguation)
