= Vairocanavajra =

12th century Buddhist Master

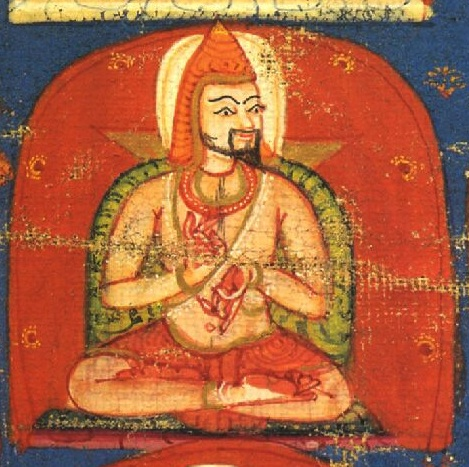
- 13th-century Tibetan depiction of Vairocanavajra currently held at the Rubin Museum of Art

Personal life
- Born: c. 12th century Dakshina Kosala
- Died: c. 12th century
- Education: Nalanda

Religious life
- Religion: Buddhism
- School: Vajrayana

Senior posting
- Teacher: Surapela; Abhayakaragupta

Vairocanavajra (also known as Vairocana and Vairocanaraksita) was a 12th-century Indian Buddhist master and alchemist who studied at the monastery of Nalanda. He is known in particular for his work in the translations of the Charyapadas which have been described as "having a lasting effect on the literary history of Tibetan Buddhism."

== Life ==
Vairocanavajra's biography was written by his Tibetan student, Zhang Yudrakpa Tsöndru Drakpa, shortly after his death and was intended to be a eulogy to his master.

Vairochanavajra was born in the 12th century in the city of Sonapura in the region of Dakshina Kosala which is just south of Magadha. From the age of 12, he travelled with his uncle, who was a non-Buddhist, to different parts of India including Western India, Magadha, and Varanasi. During his travels, he met a yogin who initiated him into the practice of the bodhisattva, Manjushri.

After this, he travelled to the monastery of Nalanda where he studied under a yogin called Surapela who belonged to the Kayastha caste. For the next eight years, Surapela taught Vairochanavajra about alchemy, arts and logic. In particular, he was taught the Dohā songs and the teachings of Maitripada. After this, he held a tantric gathering in the forests surrounding Nalanda with other masters including Siri and Mathanata. Vairochanavajra also came into contact with a scholar from the Vikramashila monastery called Gunaraksita. From him, Vairochanavajra received teachings on the Prajnaparamita, the Madhyamaka collection of teachings, and more complex tantras like the Guhyasamāja. During this period, he received teachings from other masters including Abhayakaragupta, Śarana, Jayākara and Dānaraksita.

After this period of learning, Vairocanavajra is said to have "travelled the roads of twenty-four countries" and entered the country of the Western Xia via Tibet. He was appointed the priest of a ruler called Mu thang bu of the Shing kun City but was kept as a prisoner and not allowed to leave due to his knowledge of mercurial alchemy which was believed to lengthen one's life. Eventually, he aroused the displeasure of this King and was released and travelled to Tibet.

== Teachings ==
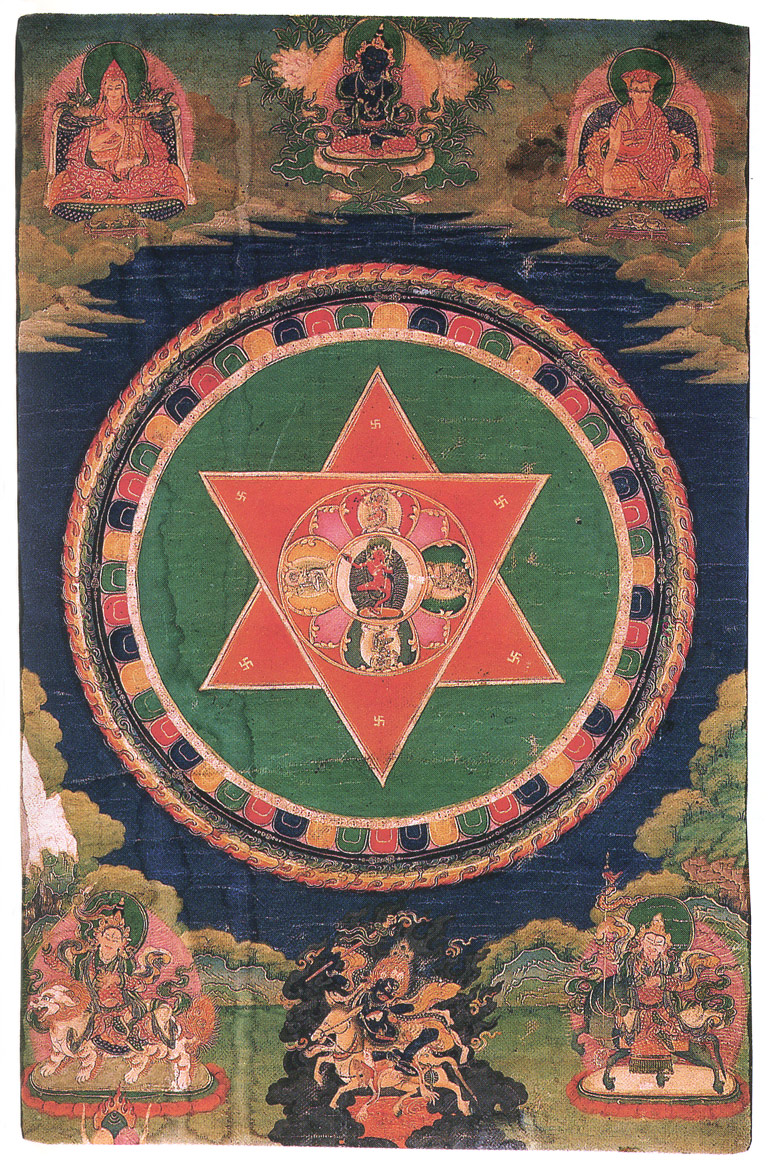
The Vajravarahi mandala. Vairocanavajra passed teachings related to Vajravarahi practices to his disciples

In addition to composing his biography, Zhang Yudrakpa Tsöndru Drakpa also details the transmission of teachings from Vairocanavajra to himself in two of his works, the Rgyud pa sna tshogs (Various Lineages) and the Bla ma sna tshogs (Various Masters). Vairocanavajra finds mention in four lines of transmission and his teacher, Surapela finds mentions in three lines. The teachings that Vairocanavajra received from his teacher, Surapela were thus passed on to his disciples in Tibet.

These lineages include the transmission of Maitripada's commentaries of the dohā literature, caṇḍālī, Vajravārāhī and Hevajra practices.

== Works ==
Eight original works and twenty translations have been attributed to Vairocanavajra. He is best known within the Tibetan tradition, for his translations of the Charyapada songs of the mahasiddhas. His translations include the work of Tilopa, Virupa and Saraha. In particular, his translation of the Dohākosa of Saraha was studied in much detail many centuries later by Taranatha.

The known works of Vairocanavajra include:

- Prajnaparicchedapanjika
- Śisyalekhatippana
- Śiksākusumamañjari
- Raktayamārisādhana
- Sadanggayogālokakrama

Works that Vairocanaraksita translated into the Tibetan language include:

- Dohākosanāmamahāmudropadeśa of Saraha
- Pāramitāsamāsa of Āryaśūra
- Mahisānasādhana of Dharmakirti
- The Prajñāpāramitāhṛdaya more commonly known as the Heart Sutra
- Kakhadohātippana of Saraha
- Dohākosa of Tilopa
- Dohākosa of Birbapa
- Dohākosapañjikā of Srīvairocanavajra
