= Abhayakaragupta =

Buddhist monk, scholar and tantric master

Abhayākaragupta
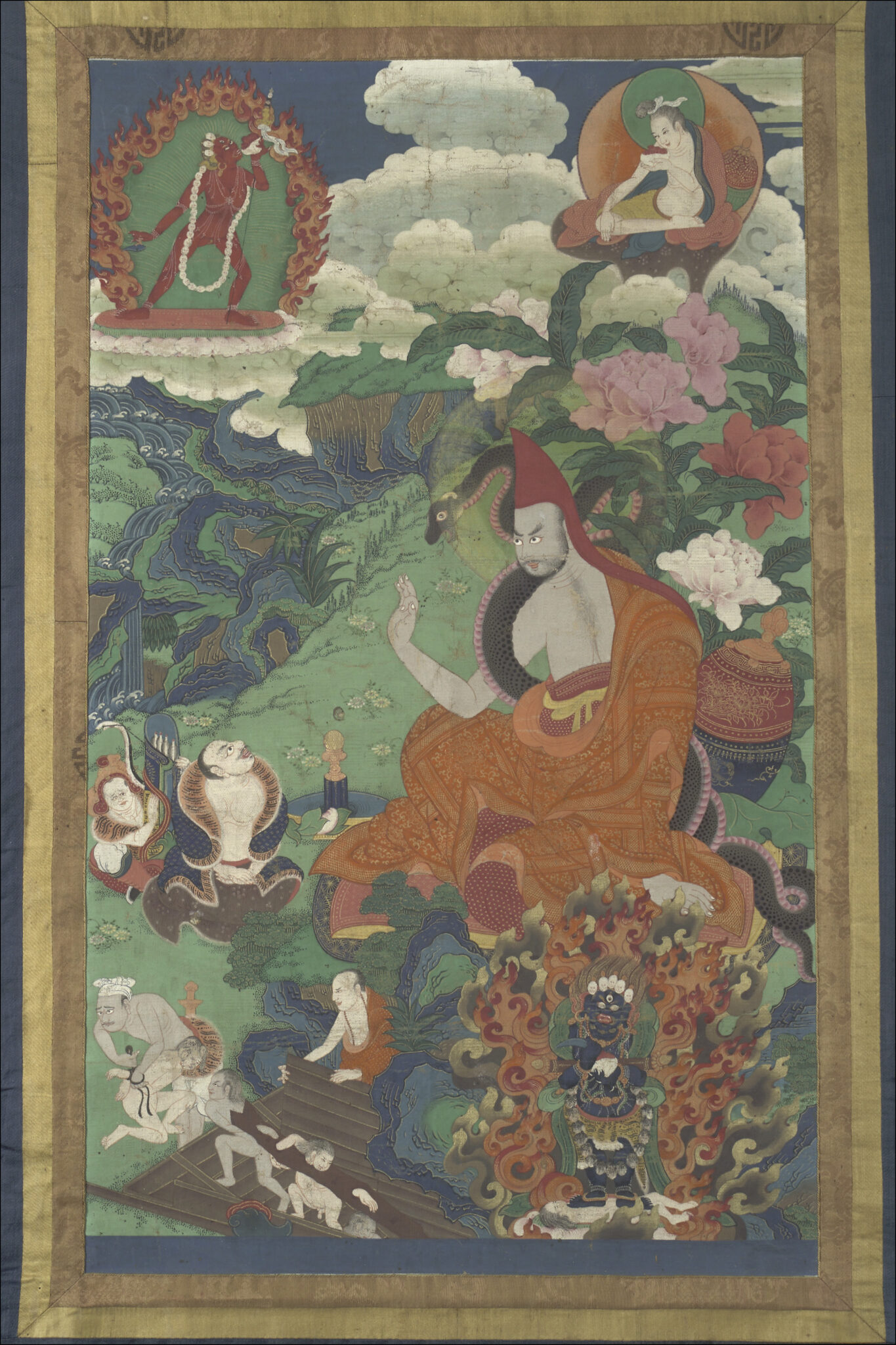
- 19th-century thangka of Abhayakaragupta currently held at the Rubin Museum of Art

Personal life
- Born: c. 1064 CE Jarikhanda
- Died: c. 1125 CE
- Education: Vikramashila; Nalanda; Odantapuri

Religious life
- Religion: Buddhism
- School: Mahāyāna Buddhism; Madhyamaka; Vajrayana

Senior posting
- Teacher: Ratnākaragupta
- Students: Vairocanavajra

Abhayākaragupta (Wylie: 'jigs-med 'byung-gnas sbas-pa) was a Buddhist monk, scholar and tantric master (vajracarya) and the abbot of Vikramasila monastery in modern-day Bihar in India. He was born in somewhere in Eastern India, and is thought to have flourished in the late 11th-early 12th century CE, and died in 1125 CE.

Abhayākaragupta's magnum opus, the Vajravali, is a "grand synthesis of tantric liturgy" which developed a single harmonized tantric ritual system which could be applied to all Tantric Buddhist mandalas. According to A.K. Warder, Abhayākaragupta developed the Mantrayana-Madhyamaka doctrine to its final Indic form. Matthew Kapstein sees him as "among the last great masters of Buddhism in India."

== Life ==
Some Tibetan sources identify his birthplace as Jarikhanda which Taranatha places next to Odisha. Gudrun Bühnemann identifies this as modern-day Jharkhand around the Chota Nagpur Plateau and Rahul Sankrityayan identified his birthplace with the modern-day town of Deoghar. The Tibetan translation of his work the Vajrayānāpattimañjarī states that he was "from Magadha" which is likely referring to where he worked around the monasteries of Nalanda and Vikramashila. He is said to have become a Buddhist monk following a prophetic vision after which he trained extensively in tantra.

Born in 1064 CE, as a youth, and on the advice of a young yogini, he went to the country of Magadha, "where he learned the five sciences and became well known as a pandit." During the reign of King Rāmapāla (c. 1075-1120), there was a great revival of Buddhism under Abhayākaragupta. He taught at the Vikramashila Mahavihara as well as at Vajrāsana (Bodh Gaya) and Odantapuri. He is credited with many miracles including feeding the starving in the city of Sukhavati from his mendicant bowl which was replenished from heaven, and bringing a dead child to life in the great cemetery of Himavana.

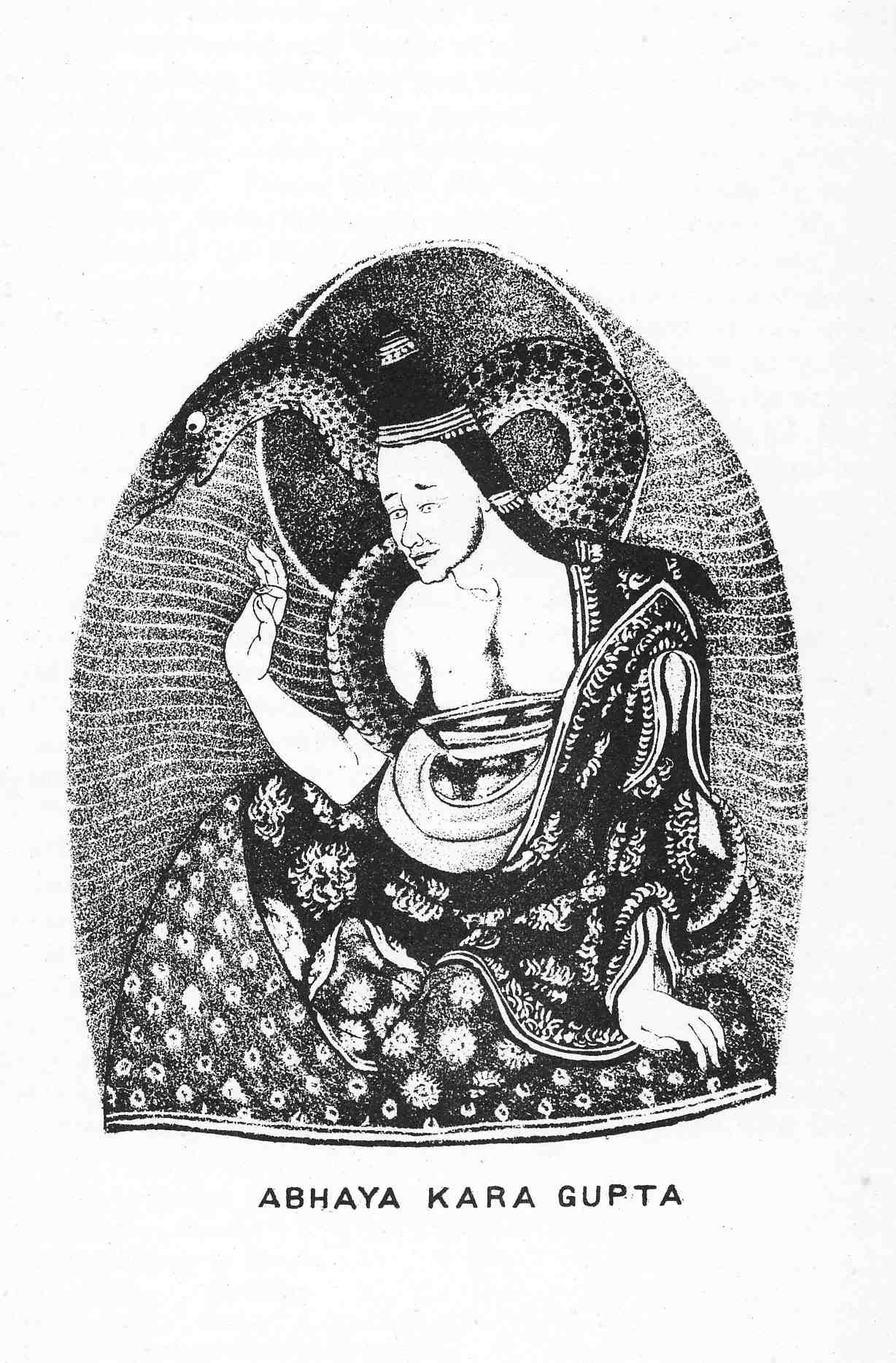
19th century depiction of Abhayakaragupta

== Teachings ==
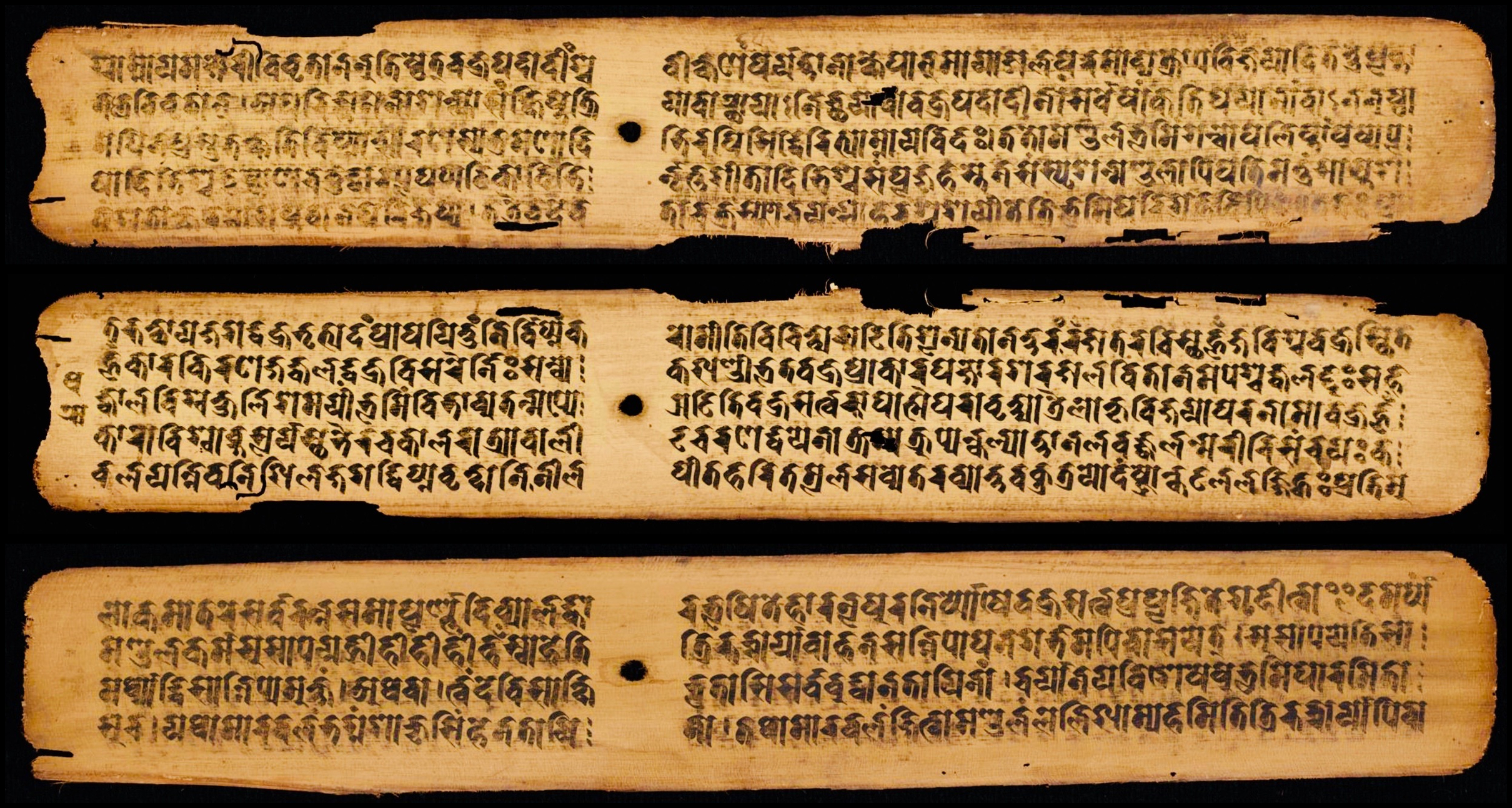
11th or 12th century Vajravali manuscript, compiled by Abhayakaragupta

Abhayākaragupta's scholarship extended from Mahayana doctrine and philosophy to Tantric Buddhist ritual and practice. David Seyfort Ruegg, writing about one of his main scholarly works writes:

The Munimatālaṃkāra is one of the last of the major comprehensive treatises of Indian Buddhism, and it presents a treatment of Mahayanist thought based on the Prajnaparamita, Madhyamaka and Yogacara traditions. Although as such it is not in the narrowest sense a work of the Madhyamaka, it bears testimony to the efforts made by the later Madhyamikas systematically to elaborate a synthesis of the entire Mahayanist tradition.

The Munimatālaṃkāra survives in Tibetan, and it was widely studied in Tibet until the 14th century when it was displaced by native treatises on similar subjects.

Another major text by Abhayākaragupta is the great Tantric work, the Vajrāvalī nāma Maṇḍalopāyikā which is a systematic exposition of Tantric Buddhist ritual (a maṇḍalavidhi) as a generic system applicable for all tantras. This work deals with preparation of the sacred space, 'installation ceremonies', tantric mandala construction (maṇḍalakarman), and the performance of tantric consecration or initiation (abhiṣeka). It is probably the first generic work of its kind which is not tied to an individual tantric tradition, but was meant to be used with all tantras and mandalas. In the Vajrāvalī, Abhayākaragupta synthesized previous Tantric ritual traditions such as those of Puṇḍarika and Padmavajra and created a standardized 'sequence of rituals' (prakriya). In the beginning of this work, Abhaya summarizes his intent for composing it thus:

The mandala and other rituals taught by the teacher have been divided into two classes (yogatantra and yoginitantra). We shall summarize them here as clearly and as systematically as possible. Moreover, the ritual treatises compiled by (other) preceptors (acarya) lack completeness, thematic core, lucid expression and sometimes authenticity and consistency. Therefore, we shall adorn it with all such good qualities.

Abhayākaragupta composed this work by selecting mandala systems and rituals from different tantric traditions and texts, and attempting to strike a balance between the yoginitantras and the yogatantra works.

His other Tantric works expound in detail on particular practices in the Vajrāvalī; the Niṣpannayogāvalī (Garland of Completed Yogas), contains detailed descriptions of the drawing of 26 mandalas while the Jyotirmañjarī details the practice of fire rituals recommended in the Vajrāvalī.

=== Mahayana texts ===
Abhayākaragupta was an advocate for the authority of Mahayana texts over texts from other schools of thought which he terms"Śrāvakayāna" (Vehicle of the Disciples). The last chapter of the Munimatālaṃkāra contains a discussion where Abhayākaragupta argues that the Mahayana is great due to the "seven points of greatness" set out by Asanga in his Abhidharma-samuccaya. He contrasts Mahayana texts with the Tripiṭaka which he states contradict each other and therefore cannot be a representation of the words of the Buddha.

Abhayākaragupta built upon the work of earlier authorities including Nāgārjuna, Bhāviveka and Vasubandhu who also pointed out the contradictory statements within the texts of other schools. What is unique about Abhayākaragupta's arguments is that he argues that Śrāvakayāna cannot be considered the words of the Buddha and that Mahāyana texts cannot be grouped with them because the latter are inherently superior.

=== Two truths doctrine ===
In the Munimatālaṃkāra, Abhayākaragupta set out that the two truths doctrine is the most crucial of teachings. It was his position that all other major doctrinal points and teachings could be subsumed under the banner of the two truths doctrine. These include the five dharmas, the three natures (Trisvabhāva), the Eight Consciousnesses and the two selflessnesses.

=== Buddha-nature ===
With regard to the doctrine of Buddha-nature, Abhayākaragupta was of the view that all sentient beings, regardless of which belief they adopt, can attain Buddha-nature as per the Ekayāna theory. He states in the Munimatālaṃkāra: “every sentient being has Buddha-nature (tathāgatagarbha)”; that is, all sentient beings are able to reach the state of perfect awakening.". This view is similar to that expounded by Kamalaśīla in the eighth century in his work, the Madhyamakāloka. Like Kamalaśīla, he also views Buddha-nature as being devoid of any intrinsic nature.

Abhayākaragupta's interpretation of Buddha-nature had an impact on later Indian Buddhist thinkers including Daśabalaśrīmitra, Ratnarakṣita and Jayānanda.

=== Impact in Tibet ===
Abhayākaragupta's school of Buddhism flourished in India until the invasions of the Turks in the 13th century killed or scattered them; but his teachings were continued and revered in Tibet. Through his works at Vikramaśīla, he exerted great influence on the formation of Tibetan Buddhism, particularly during the twelfth through fourteenth centuries.

In the lineage of the Tibetan Panchen Lamas there were considered to be four Indian and three Tibetan incarnations of Amitābha Buddha before Khedrup Gelek Pelzang, who is recognised as the 1st Panchen Lama. The lineage starts with Subhuti, one of the original disciples of Gautama Buddha. Abhayākaragupta is considered to be the fourth Indian incarnation of Amitabha Buddha in this line.

== Works ==
26 works are attributed to Abhayakaragupta of which twenty-five have been preserved in the Tibetan language and thirteen are still extant in the original Sanskrit. Of his works, twenty-two have been classified as tantric and four as non-tantric. His non-tantric works mainly focus on Madhyamaka philosophy.

His works include:

- Vajravalimandopayika, a treatise on Buddhist Tantra
- Amnaya-mañjari, a commentary on the Samputatantra
- Marmakaumudī ('Moonlight of Points'), commentary on the Perfection of Wisdom Sutra in Eight Thousand Lines.
- Ocean of Means of Achievement (Tib. sgrub thabs rgya mtsho)
- Munimatālaṃkāra ('Ornament to the Subduer's Thought', Tib. thub pa'i dgongs rgyan), an encyclopedic Mahayana treatise based on Maitreya's Abhisamayalankara.
- Niṣpannayogāvalī (Garland of Completed Yogas), a text which explains how to draw 26 kinds of mandalas.
- Jyotirmañjari, discusses fire ritual (homa)
- Kālacakrāvatāra (Introduction to the Wheel of Time)
- Upadeshamañjari, explicates the generation stage and completion stage.
