= Dadra (disambiguation) =

Dadra is associated with the Hindustani classical music of the Indian subcontinent.

Dadra may also refer to:

- Dadra, Jaunpur, a village in Uttar Pradesh, India
- Dadra and Nagar Haveli district, a district of the union territory of Dadra and Nagar Haveli and Daman and Diu, in western India
  - Dadra, Dadra and Nagar Haveli and Daman and Diu, a small town in Dadra and Nagar Haveli district
  - Dadra taluk, a taluk (subdistrict) of Dadra and Nagar Haveli district
  - Dadra and Nagar Haveli (Lok Sabha constituency), an Indian parliamentary constituency

== See also ==
- Dadar (disambiguation)
