= Indrabhuti =

Name attributed to various individuals

Indrabhuti (alternatively King Ja) is a name attributed to a number of individuals that have become conflated in Vajrayana Buddhism. One Indrabhuti, considered a Mahasiddha, was a disciple of Lawapa.

== Identities of the king ==
Samten Karmay attempted to identify the different personages known as Indrabhutai.

== Conflation of Indrabhuti related to conflation of Oddiyana ==
The matter of the conflation of Indrabhuti and at least one evocation of the historicity of a particular personage by that name is intimately connected with the location of 'Oddiyana' (the locality denoted by the term 'Oddiyana' whether in each case cited is Swat Valley or Odisha or some other location is glossed with a suite of orthographic representations and near homophones which require further case-by-case examination and exploration), Odisha and the cult of Jaganath and a number of texts that inform the matter such as the Sādhanamālā, Kālikā Purāṇa, Caturāsiti-siddha-Pravṛtti, Jñānasiddhi as Donaldson (2001: p. 11) frames an overview of some of the debate and then ventures further salience:

In his argument, P. C. Bagchi states that there are two distinct series of names in Tibetan: (1) O-rgyān, U-rgyān, O-ḍi-yā-na, and (2) O-ḍi-vi-śā, with the first series connected with Indrabhūti, i.e., Oḍiyăna and Uḍḍiyāna, while the second series falls back on Oḍi and Oḍiviśa, i.e., Uḍra (Orissa) and has nothing to do with Indrabhūti. N.K. Sahu objects, however, and points out that these two sets of names are seldom distinguished in Buddhist Tantra literature, and opines that the words Oḍa, Oḍra, Uḍra, Oḍiviśa and Oḍiyāna are all used as variants of Uḍḍiyāna. In the Sādhanamālā, he further points out, Uḍḍiyāna is also spelt as Oḍrayāna while in the Kālikā Purāṇa, as indicated earlier, it is spelt either Uḍḍiyāna or Oḍra. There is also evidence, Sahu continues, that Indrabhūti is the king of Orissa rather than of the Swāt valley. The Caturāsiti-siddha-Pravṛtti, for example, mentions him as the king of Oḍiviśa while Cordier, in his Bṣtān-ḥgyur catalogue, gives sufficient indications of his being the king of Orissa. Also, in his famous work Jñānasiddhi, king Indrabhūti opens it with an invocation to Lord Jagannātha, a deity intimately associated with Orissa and with no other area of India.

== King Ja, receiver of gifts from the sky ==
According to Nyingma tradition, King Ja (also known as Indrabhuti) taught himself intuitively from "the Book" of the Tantric Way of Secret Mantra (that is Mantrayana) that magically fell from the sky along with other sacred objects and relics "upon the roof of King Ja" according to Dudjom (1904–1987), et al. (1991: p. 613 History) this happened on the Tibetan calendar year of the Earth Monkey, which Dudjom et al. identify as 853 BC[E]. King Ja taught Kukuraja, the "Dog King", from "the Book." This date of 853 BC[E] is problematic as it puts the event prior to the dates of the historical Buddha Shakyamuni circa 500 BCE as well as prior to the emergence of Tantra in any of its historical permutations according to modern Western peer-reviewed scholarship bar the lineages of the Bonpo (the dates are according to Bonpo tradition which are contended with) which not 'officially' tantric have many elements akin to tantra traditions. Moreover, it should be stated that the falling of Buddhadharma relics upon a Tibetan royal palace also happened in the case of Thothori Nyantsen and these two stories (i.e. the story of Thothori Nyantsen and the narrative of King Ja) may have influenced each other as they share a distinctive motif of magical realism.

Dudjom (1904–1987), et al. (1991: p. 460 History) also include another important source that impacts on this story of King Ja and salient dates for the greater tantric tradition, particularly the dating of the emergence of the texts of Anuyoga with the provision of a quote of what Dudjom et al. identify as a "prediction" found in the fifth chapter of the 'Tantra which Comprises the Supreme Path of the Means which Clearly Reveal All-Positive Pristine Cognition' (Wylie: kun bzang ye shes gsal bar ston pa'i thabs kyi lam mchog 'dus pa'i rgyud, Nyingma Gyubum Vol.3) which Dudjom, et al., render in English thus:

The Mahayoga tantras will fall onto the palace of King Ja. The Anuyoga tantras will emerge in the forests of Singhala [Dudjom et al. identify Singhala as located in Ceylon].

== Indrabhuti, at the time of Tilopa, disciple of Kambalapada ==
Choudhury (2007: p. 6) states in relation to Indrabhuti who was the disciple of Kambalapada (fl. 10th century):

The Sidhacharyas popularised the tenets of vajrayana by composing numerous texts. Indrabhuti, disciple of the saint Kambalapada, created a sensation by composing his famous treatise 'yajnasidhi'.

Indrabhuti learned of 'insight' (Sanskrit: prajñā) though the instruction of Tilopa (988–1069 CE).

== See also ==
- Luipa
- Dream Yoga
