= Charyapada =

Collection of Buddhist mystical poems

The Charyapada is a collection of mystical poems, songs of realization in the Vajrayāna tradition of Buddhism from the tāntric tradition in Assam, Bengal, Bihar and Odisha.

It was compiled between the c. 1000-1200 CE, in late Apabhraṃśa or various Abahaṭ‌ṭha dialects, representing the formative stage of the Eastern Indo-Aryan languages. It was written during a period when the northeastern Prākrit languages had not yet differentiated into later forms, or they were just getting differentiated. Scholars of many eastern Indo-Aryan languages, such as Assamese, Bengali, Magahi, Maithili, and Odia find features of these languages in the language of this work. A palm-leaf manuscript of the Charyāpada was rediscovered in the early 20th century by Haraprasād Shāstrī at the Nepal Royal Court Library. The Charyāpada was also preserved in the Tibetan Buddhist canon.

== Manuscripts ==
Pages from the Charyapada

The original palm-leaf manuscript of the Charyapada, or Caryācaryāviniścaya, spanning 47 padas (verses) along with a Sanskrit commentary, was edited by Haraprashad Shastri and published from Bangiya Sahitya Parishad as a part of his Hajar Bacharer Purano Bangala Bhasay Bauddhagan O Doha (Buddhist Songs and Couplets) in 1916 under the name of Charyacharyavinishchayah. This manuscript is presently preserved at the National Archives of Nepal. Prabodhchandra Bagchi later published a manuscript of a Tibetan translation containing 50 verses. Traditional Tibetan sources assign the translation of the dohās to the 12th century Indian Buddhist monk of Nalanda, Vairocanavajra.

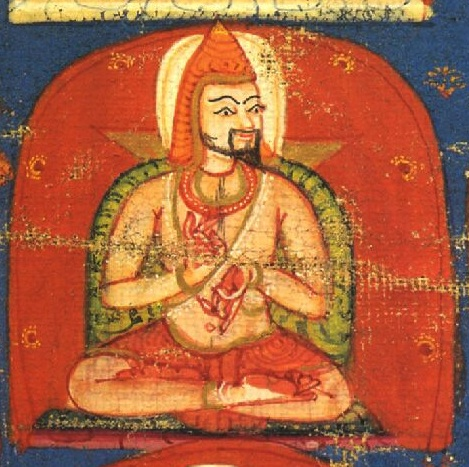
Tibetan depiction of the 12th century monk of Nalanda, Vairocanavajra, who translated the Charyapadas into Tibetan

The Tibetan translation provided additional information, including that the Sanskrit commentary in the manuscript, known as Charyagiti-koshavrtti, was written by Munidatta. It also mentions that the original text was translated by Shilachari and its commentary by Munidatta was translated by Chandrakirti or Kirtichandra.

== Poets ==
The poets and their works as mentioned in the text are as follows:

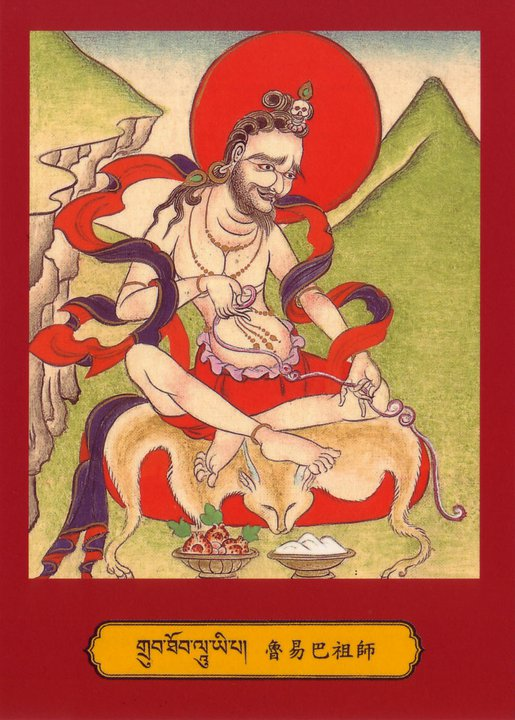
Luipa, the author of the first poem of Charyapada

Poet	Pada
Luipāda	1,29
Kukkuripāda	2, 20, 48
Virubāpāda	3
Gundaripāda	4
Chatillapāda	5
Bhusukupāda	6, 21, 23, 27, 30, 41, 43, 49
Kānhapāda	7, 9, 10, 11, 12, 13, 18, 19, 24, 36, 40, 42, 45
Kambalāmbarapāda	8
Dombipāda	14
Shantipāda	15, 26
Mahidharapāda	16
Vināpāda	17
Sarahapāda	22, 32, 38, 39
Shabarapāda	28, 50
Āryadevapāda	31
Dhendhanapāda	33
Darikapāda	34
Bhādepāda	35
Tādakapāda	37
Kankanapāda	44
Jayanandipāda	46
Dhāmapāda	47
Tantripāda	25

The manuscript of the Charyapada discovered by Haraprasad Shastri from Nepal consists of 47 padas (verses). The title-page, the colophon, and pages 36, 37, 38, 39, and 66 (containing padas 24, 25, and 48 and their commentary) were missing in this manuscript. The 47 verses of this manuscript were composed by 22 of the Mahasiddhas (750 and 1150 CE), or Siddhacharyas, whose names are mentioned at the beginning of each pada (except the first pada). Some parts of the manuscripts are lost; however, in the Tibetan Buddhist Canon, a translation of 50 padas is found, which includes padas 24, 25, and 48, and the complete pada 23. Pada 25 was written by the Siddhacharya poet Tantripāda, whose work was previously missing. In his commentary on pada 10, Munidatta mentions the name of another Siddhacharya poet, Ladidombipāda, but no pada written by him has been discovered so far.

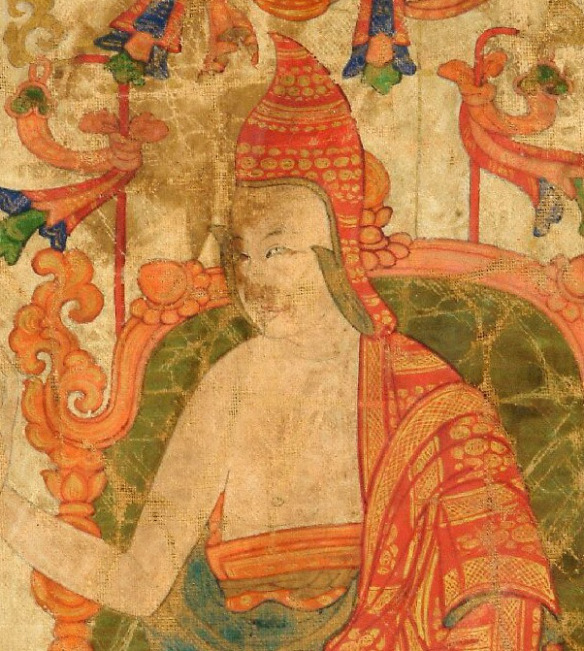
Shantideva aka Bhusuku pa, the author of the 2nd highest number of poems of Charyapada

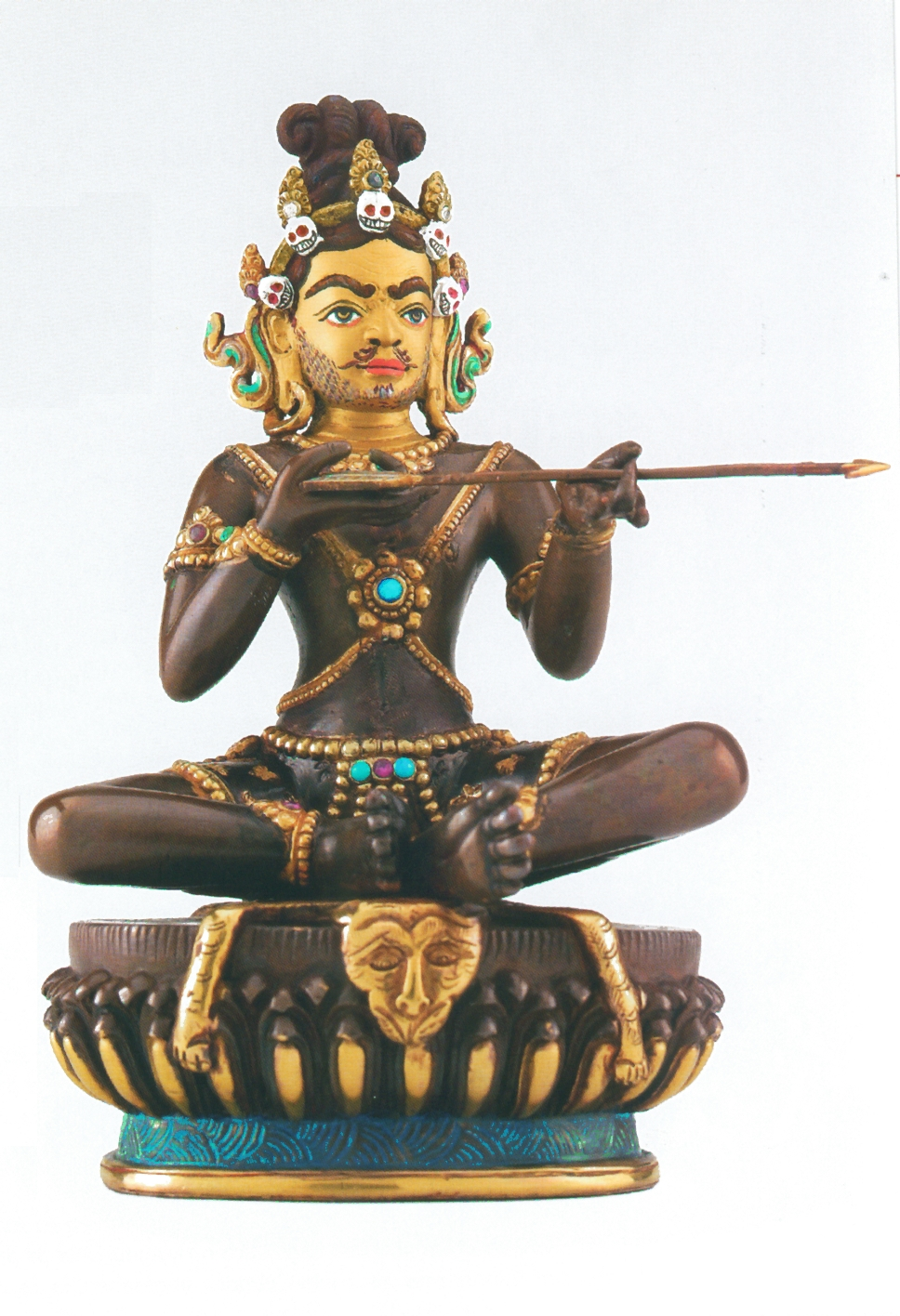
A contemporary bronze image of Sarahapa holding an arrow, probably made in Nepal

The names of the Siddhacharyas in Sanskrit (or its Tibetan language equivalent), and the raga in which the verse was to be sung, are given prior to each pada. The Sanskrit names of the Siddhacharya poets were likely assigned to each pada by the commentator Munidatta.

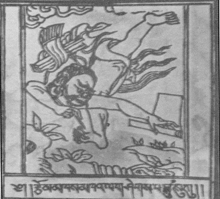
A sketch of Siddhacharya poet Kanhapada

== Period ==
Haraprasad Shastri, who rediscovered the Charyapada, conjectured that it was written during the 10th century. However, according to Suniti Kumar Chatterji, it was composed between 10th and 12th century. Prabodh Chandra Bagchi upholds this view. Sukumar Sen, while supporting this view, also states that the Charyapada could have been written between the 11th and 14th centuries. However, Muhammad Shahidullah was of the opinion that the Charyapada dates back to an even earlier time. He maintained that it was likely to have been composed between 7th and 11th century. Rahul Sankrityayan thought that the Charyapada was probably written between 8th and 11th century.

== Language ==
Haraprasad Shastri, in his introduction to the Charyacharya-vinishchaya, referred to the enigmatic language of its verses as "twilight language" (Sanskrit: Sandhya-bhasha), or Alo-andhari (half-expressed and half-concealed) based on the Sanskrit commentary of Munidatta. Vidhushekhara Shastri, on the basis of evidence from a number of Buddhist texts, later referred to this language as 'Intentional Language' (Sanskrit: Sandha-bhasha).

The padas were written by poets from different regions, and it is natural that they would display linguistic affinities from these regions. Different scholars have noted the affinities of the language of the Charyapada with Assamese, Bengali, Magahi, Maithili and Odia.

=== Affinities with Assamese ===
Luipa was from Kamarupa and wrote two charyas. Sarahapa, another poet, is said to have been from Rani, a place close to present-day Guwahati. Some of the affinities with Assamese are:

Negatives – the negative particle in Assamese comes ahead of the verb: na jãi (No. 2, 15, 20, 29); na jivami (No. 4); na chadaa, na jani, na disaa (No. 6). Charya 15 has 9 such forms.
Present participles – the suffix -ante is used as in Assamese of the Vaishnava period: jvante (while living, No. 22); sunante (while listening, No. 30) etc.
Incomplete verb forms – suffixes -i and -iya used in modern and Early Assamese respectively: kari (3, 38); cumbi (4); maria (11); laia (28) etc.
Present indefinite verb forms – -ai: bhanai (1); tarai (5); pivai (6).
Future – the -iva suffix: haiba (5); kariba (7).
Nominative case ending – case ending in -e: kumbhire khaa, core nila (2).
Dative-Accusative case ending – case ending in -aka: ṭhākuraka pariṇibittā (12), nāsaka thāti (21).
Instrumental case ending – case ending -e and -era: uju bate gela (15); kuthare chijaa (45).
Genitive case ending – case ending in -ara: sasara siṁge (41).
Locative case ending – case ending in -ata, e: māṅgata caṛhile (8), bāṭata milila (8), bājai bīranāde (11).

The vocabulary of the Charyapadas includes non-tatsama words which are typically Assamese, such as dala (1), thira kari (3, 38), tai (4), uju (15), caka (14) etc.

=== Affinities with Bengali ===
A large number of the Siddhacharyas who wrote the verses of Charyapada were from Bengal. The affinities with Bengali language are:

Genitive -era, -ara;
Locative -te, -e/A;
Nominative -Ta;
Present participles – the suffix -ante and -anta is used in Middle Bengali;
Present indefinite verb -ai that transformed into -e in modern Bangla: bolai; basai; nāchai.
Negatives – the negative particle, used ahead of the verb in both Early and Modern Bengali poetry, also prevalent in many dialects of Modern Bangla.
Second Person Suffix singular -asi/si that transformed into -is- in modern Standard Bangla and -ôs in dialectal Bengali: aisasi, bujhasi
Incomplete verb forms of participles – suffixes -i and -iya used in modern poetry and Early and Middle Bangla both
Post-positional words like majha, antara, sanga;
Past and future bases -ila- and -iba-; gāila, nila, gela and kariba, jāiba etc.
Nominative case ending – case ending in e is prevalent in many dialects in modern Bangla (even certain situations in standard Bangla) as well as middle Bangla: chore nila; kumbhire khāa.
Instrumental case ending – case ending -e;
Conjunctive indeclinable -ia;
Conjunctive conditional -ite;
Passive -ia-
Dative-Accusative case ending – case ending in -ka and -re: ṭhākuraka, tohore, tore etc.
Substantive roots – ach and thak, both used for all tenses, unlike in modern Bangla where the latter is used for future tense and the former elsewhere.
Present – the -i suffix for 1st person: bahi; jani; hoi.
Future – the -iba suffix for 1st person: jāiba; haiba; kariba; bhāiba (<bhābiba).

Ekaso (100), Padama (Padma:Lotus), Chausatthi (64), Pakhudi (petals) Tahin (there, in that), Charhi (climb/rise), nachai (dances), Dombi (a Bengali woman belonging to the scheduled caste, Domi/Domni), Bapuri (a Bengali word for 'poor fellow'; 'বাপুর, বাপুড়া')

=== Affinities with Bihari languages ===
Several scholars have noted the affinities of the Charyapadas with Bihari languages like Magahi and Maithili. Rahul Sankrityayan in his Puratatv Nibandhawali noted that most of the Siddhas who composed the poems were from Bihar and the language used was an early form of Magahi. The historian, K. P. Jayaswal deemed the Charyapada poems to be an early form of Maithili.

=== Affinities with Odia ===
The beginnings of Odia poetry coincide with the development of Charya Sahitya, the literature thus started by Mahayana Buddhist poets.

== Rāga ==
Before each song in the manuscript, a Rāga is given to which it is to be sung. The complete set of rāga used in the Charyapada is list below.

Raga	Pada
Patamanjari	1, 6, 7, 9, 11, 17, 20, 29, 31, 33, 36
Gabadā or Gaudā	2, 3, 18
Aru	4
Gurjari, Gunjari or Kanha-Gunjari	5, 22, 41, 47
Devakri	8
Deshākha	10, 32
Kāmod	13, 27, 37, 42
Dhanasi or Dhanashri	14
Rāmakri	15, 50
Balāddi or Barādi	21, 23, 28, 34
Shabari	26, 46
Mallāri	30, 35, 44, 45, 49
Mālasi	39
Mālasi-Gaburā	40
Bangāl	43
Bhairavi	12, 16, 19, 38

While some of these Rāgas are extinct, the names of some of these Rāgas may actually be variant names of popular Rāgas we know today.
