= Kukkuripa =

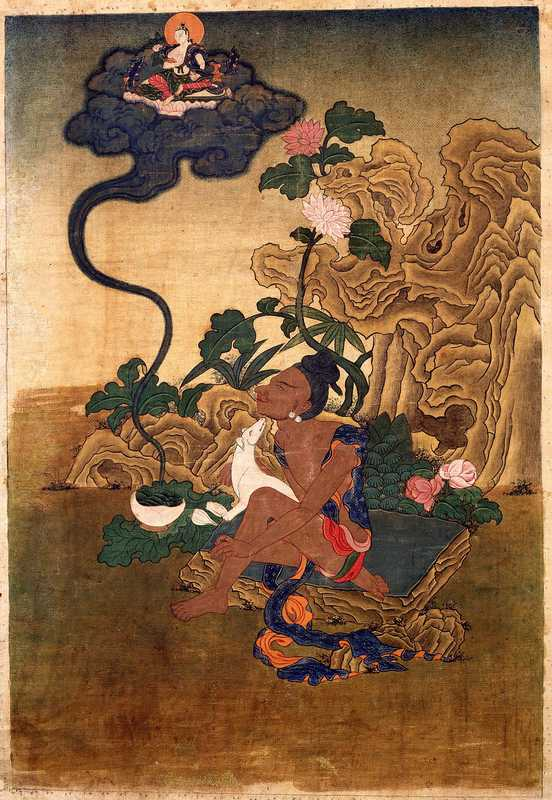
Kukkuripa

Kukkuripa was a mahasiddha who lived in India. He became interested in tantric Buddhist practice, and chose the path of renunciation. During his travels, he found a starving dog in a bush. Moved by compassion, he fed the dog and took care of her. The two stayed together and eventually found a cave where Kukkuripa could meditate in peace. When he went out for food, the dog would stay and guard the cave.

One day, after 12 years passed, the stories say that the gods of the Thirty-three sensual heavens took note of Kukkuripa's accomplishments, and invited him to their heavens. He accepted, and while there he was given many pleasurable things, such as great feasts. Every time he would think of his loyal dog, left behind at the cave, he would begin to think that he should return to her, but every time they would convince him to stay.

Eventually, he looked down from the heavens and saw that his dog had become thin, sad, and hungry, and right there he decided that he would return to the cave. Upon his return, both master and dog were happy, and upon scratching her, the dog instantly vanished. In her place stood a dakini. The dakini told him that he had learned that there are greater things than temptation, and helped grant him realization. He attained realization, and returned to Kapilavastu, where he lived a long life for the benefit of others.

According to lama Surya Das:

The Wisdom-Dakini said: “Kukkuripa is free from concepts. He sleeps in an outhouse, consorts with bitches, is without possessions; plays no instruments, and parrots no prayers or scriptures. Since he relies on no higher authority than innate wisdom-awareness, we sky-going dakinis are bound to sport and consort with him.”

== As a monk-poet ==
Kukkuripa was known for his Tantric songs of realization and three of his verses appear in the Charyapada, a collection of songs from 8-12th Century India.

This Tantric Buddhist monk contributed 2, 20 and 48 songs among the 50 songs referred in the discovered manuscript, the Charyapada'. The 48 song is missing from the manuscript, though other two songs were retained in the manuscript. The translations of the two poems in English reveals that Kukkuripa had experimentation with "SOMROS" and "KAAMROS", the excess of 'alcoholic drink' and 'sexuality'. He created an atmosphere in these poems as if we were living in the time and places where people have to indulge in epicurean outfit. You kiss the song maid and become immortal. The song maid makes wine for your pleasure. Here, the song maid is the epicenter for your attainment of that elated state of soul that is out of disease, decay and regeneration. The poem, 20 presents the eternal appeal of a craving beloved vis-a-vis a mother who is satiated through the communion with her satisfied, monk and gets redemption consequently. The mother soul is even not satisfied as the baby boy cannot retain stainless existence. All is the victim to peril:

The bottle empties to the lees

Exhausting by union with the clergy sexless.

Rising out of the womb that I saw

Hoped for other though I missed as an awe.

The boy that I wanted as a ma

So ill-fate the boy truly he has flaw.

My youthful passion killed the puberty off

The glittering glow drove the darkening shaft.

All the rivulets meet at the estuary

You know the axiom; you out of the aviary.{Charyapada#The Feminine Exuberance in Kukkuripa}

Thus; the mundanity has been made the content for the purpose to serve the preaching easily to the common mass.

== See also ==
- Mahasiddha
- Charyapada
