= Lawapa =

Lawapa or Lavapa (Wylie: la ba pa; grub chen la ba pa; wa ba pa) was a figure in Tibetan Buddhism who flourished in the 10th century. He was also known as Kambala and Kambalapada (Sanskrit: Kaṃbalapāda). Lawapa, was a mahasiddha, or accomplished yogi, who travelled to Tsari. Lawapa was a progenitor of the Dream Yoga sādhanā and it was from Lawapa that the mahasiddha Tilopa received the Dream Yoga practice lineage.

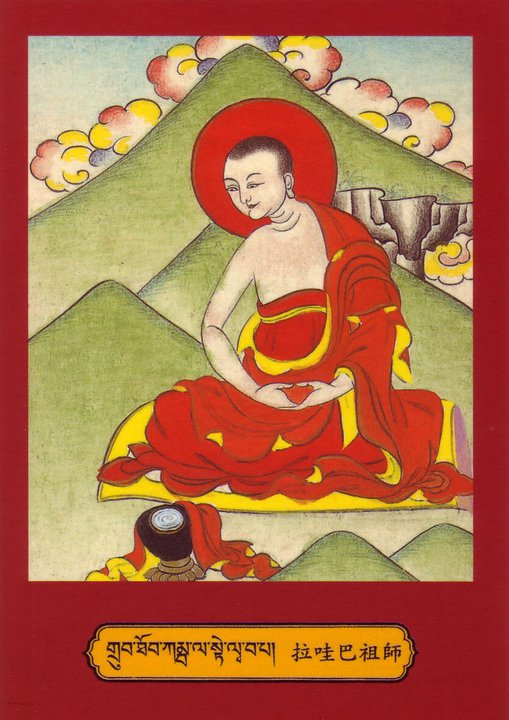
Lawapa, also known as Kambala and Kambalapada

Bhattacharya, while discussing ancient Bengali literature, proffers that Lawapa composed the Kambalagītika (Wylie: la ba pa'i glu "Lawapa's Song") and a few songs of realization in the Charyapada.

Simmer-Brown (2001: p. 57) when conveying the ambiguity of ḍākinīs in their "worldly" and "wisdom" guises conveys a detailed narrative that provides the origin of Lawapa's name:

Worldly ḍākinīs are closely related to the māras of India, who haunted the Buddha under the tree of awakening. In this role, they took whatever form might correspond to the vulnerabilities of their target, including beguiling and seductive forms of exquisite beauty. When that ruse failed, they again became vicious ghouls and demonesses. When the yogin Kambala meditated in an isolated cave at Panaba Cliff, the local mamo ḍākinīs plotted to obstruct his meditation. Noticing that he was particularly reliant upon a tattered black woolen blanket that also served as his only robe, they asked to borrow it. Sensing the power of the blanket, they tore it into shreds and devoured it, burning a final scrap in his cooking fire. In anger Kambala magically transformed the mamo ḍākinīs into sheep and sheared them, so that when they returned to their original forms their heads were shaven. Fearing the power of his realization, the mamos vomited up the shreds of blanket, and Kambala collected the pieces and rewove them. From that day, he was called Lvapa, or "master of the blanket".

== Nomenclature, orthography and etymology ==
Alternate English orthographies are Lwabapa, Lawapa and Lvapa. An alternate English nomenclature for Lawapa is Kambala.

== Hevajra ==
The Hevajra Tantra, a yoginī tantra of the anuttarayogatantra class, is held to have originated between the late eighth century C.E. (Snellgrove), and the "late ninth or early tenth century" (Davidson), in Eastern India, possibly Bengal. Tāranātha lists Saroruha and Kampala (also known as "Lva-va-pā, "Kambhalī", and "Śrī-prabhada") as its "bringers":

... the foremost yogi Virūpā meditated on the path of Yamāri and attained siddhi under the blessings of Vajravārāhi,...His disciple Dombi Heruka...understood the essence of the Hevajra Tantra, and composed many śāstras like the Nairātmā-devi-sādhana and the Sahaja-siddhi. He also conferred abhiṣeka on his own disciples. After this, two ācāryas Lva-va-pā and Saroruha brought the Hevajra Tantra. ... Siddha Sarouha was the first to bring the Hevajra-pitṛ-sādhana.

=== Principal teachers ===
The Tibetan Buddhism Resource Center (2006) identifies three principal teachers of Lawapa:

- Anangavajra (Sanskrit; Tibetan: yan lag med pa'i rdo rje)
- (Tibetan: Deng ki pa)
- Vajravarahi (Yeshe Tshogyal) (Sanskrit; Tibetan: rdo rje phag mo).

=== Principal students ===
The Tibetan Buddhism Resource Center (2006) identifies two principal students of Lawapa:

- (Tibetan: nag po spyod pa)
- (Tibetan: indra bhu ti).

== See also ==
- Charyapada
- Trance
- Bardo
- Padmasambhava
- Six Yogas
