= Buddhaguptanātha =

Indian Buddhist master

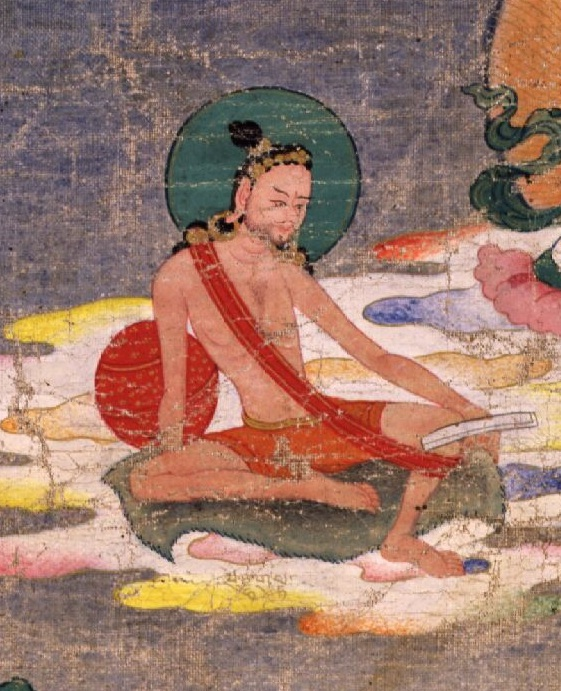
18th century image of Buddhaguptanatha

Buddhaguptanatha (1514-1610 CE) was an Indian Buddhist tantric master active in the 16th century. Notably he was the teacher of the Tibetan Lama and writer, Taranatha.

== Biography ==
The only source on Buddhaguptanatha's life is the biography composed by his disciple, Taranatha.

Buddhaguptanatha was born to a wealthy merchant in the coastal city of Indra-linga located near the modern city of Rameswaram in Tamil Nadu. He was one of eight siblings. At a young age and with the permission of his father, he joined a community of yogins belonging to the Nath sect which combined aspects of Buddhism and Hinduism. As per David Templeman, throughout his life, Buddhaguptanatha continued to combine elements of both religions into his practice and visited pilgrimage sites associated with both religions. At some point, Buddhaguptanatha left the group and began travelling. He visited a wide range of Buddhist holy sites including the Mahabodhi Temple of Bodh Gaya. He also ventured further afield and visited the region of Oddiyana, the Swat valley and eastern Afghanistan including places near Ghazni and Mazar-i-Sharif. For sixteen years, he practiced in an abandoned temple to Shiva situated in South India and then went on to visit a temple nearby dedicated to Hevajra. On an island off the coast of India, he took tantric initiations into Hevajra and the Cakrasaṃvara Tantra from a teacher named Sumati.

From here he went to Sri Lanka where he stayed for five years. It was here that he heard about his future teacher, Shantigupta. Shantigupta was a court priest for the Baghela Kingdom of Baghelkhand. The Baghelas themselves were Hindu but may have also patronised other religions like Buddhism. It also seems that Buddhaguptanatha was also patronised by them.

Buddhaguptanatha began to move northwards travelling to Tibet from Assam where he visited the monastery of Samye along with Lhasa. It was in the region of Ü-Tsang that he would first meet his student, Taranatha. Taranatha received various teachings and initiations from Buddhaguptanatha including those related to Hevajra and Tara. After a three-month stay in Tibet, Buddhaguptanatha returned to India where he continued his travels although little else about his life is known beyond this point.
