= Dombi Heruka =

Mahasiddha in Indian and Tibetan Buddhism

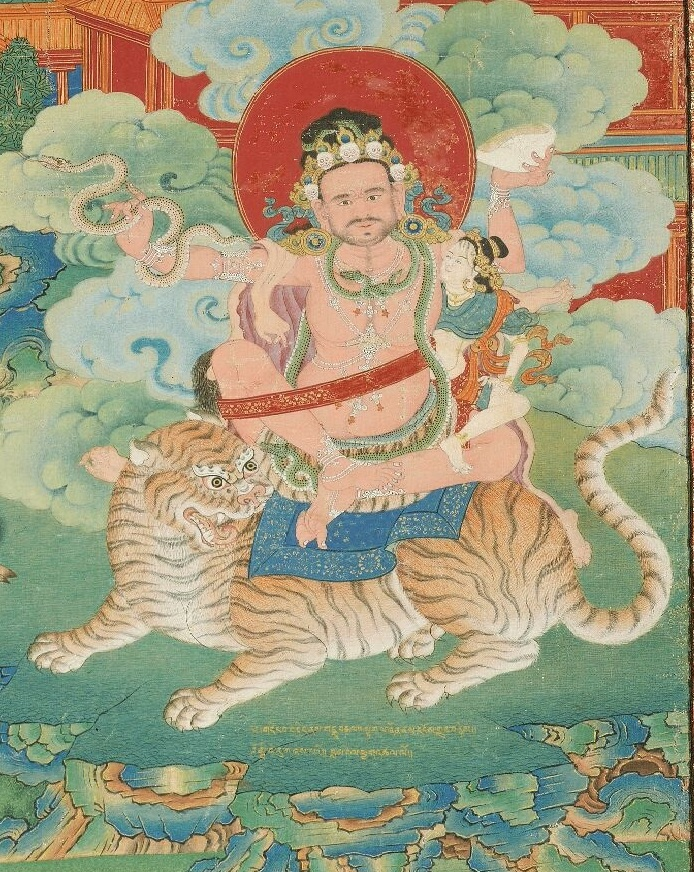
18th century image of Dombi Heruka

Dombi Heruka (8th-9th century CE, Sanskrit: Ḍombi Heruka, Tibetan: ཌོམ་བི་ཧེ་རུ་ཀ, Wylie: Dom bi he ru ka), also known as Dombipa (Sanskrit: Ḍombipa, Tibetan: ཌོམྦི་པ།, Wylie: Dom bhi pa) and by his epithet Tiger-Rider, is one of the eighty-four mahasiddhas ('great adept') venerated in Vajrayana Buddhism. In paintings and sculptures, he is depicted seated on a tiger, with a snake in his hand, sometimes in union with his consort.

Dombi Heruka is described as king of Magadha or Tripura; or at least a Brahmin son of a local chieftain. His legends and name emphasize his relationship with an outcaste spiritual consort, which was taboo. He is associated with Tantric rituals related to the deity Hevajra. A few works including Shri-sahaja-siddhi are attributed to Dombi Heruka.

Various lama lineages like the Gelugpa Longdol Lama, Trungpa tulkus and Tai Situpa lamas claim to be incarnations of Dombi Heruka.

== Names and dating ==
Dombi Heruka is an amalgamation of two terms - dombi and heruka. Dombi refers to an "untouchable" nomadic artist caste, to which the mahasiddha's spiritual consort belonged. Heruka refers to the deity Samvara or the mahasiddha's chosen deity Hevajra. It also refers to siddhas, who embody the god's attributes. His legend says that Dombi Heruka becomes Hevajra, which may also explain his name.

His other name, Dombipa, means "he who relates with the lower caste" or "Lord of the Dombi".

Dombi Heruka possibly was born in the late eighth century CE and lived through the early ninth century.

== Legends ==
According to the legend in Abhayadatta Sri's 12th century work on the mahasiddhas, Dombi Heruka was a king of Magadha. He was a student of another mahasiddha Virupa. Virupa taught him the mediational methods to realize the deity Hevajra. He was a benevolent ruler. He hung a bell in the city, which could be rung by the subjects in need. The well-governed kingdom prospered.

Once, a group of wandering minstrels (Dombis) visited to entertain the king. The enlightened king observed amongst them a virgin twelve-year old girl, whom he found suitable as a spiritual consort. Though she was an outcaste, the king practised tantric rites with her in secrecy for twelve years. When her low-caste status was revealed to the subjects, the king was forced to abdicate due to the scandal, handing over the kingdom to his son. Dombi Heruka retired to the forest with his mystical consort. In a hermitage, he practised tantric rites with his consort for twelve years.

The kingdom fell into decline. A delegation went to the forest to request the king to return. There they observed the consort miraculously walking on lotus leaves to the middle of the lake and fetching elixir deep from the lake. The representatives were bewildered and announced the incident to the subjects. Another group visited back and invited the king back to rule, to which he acceded.

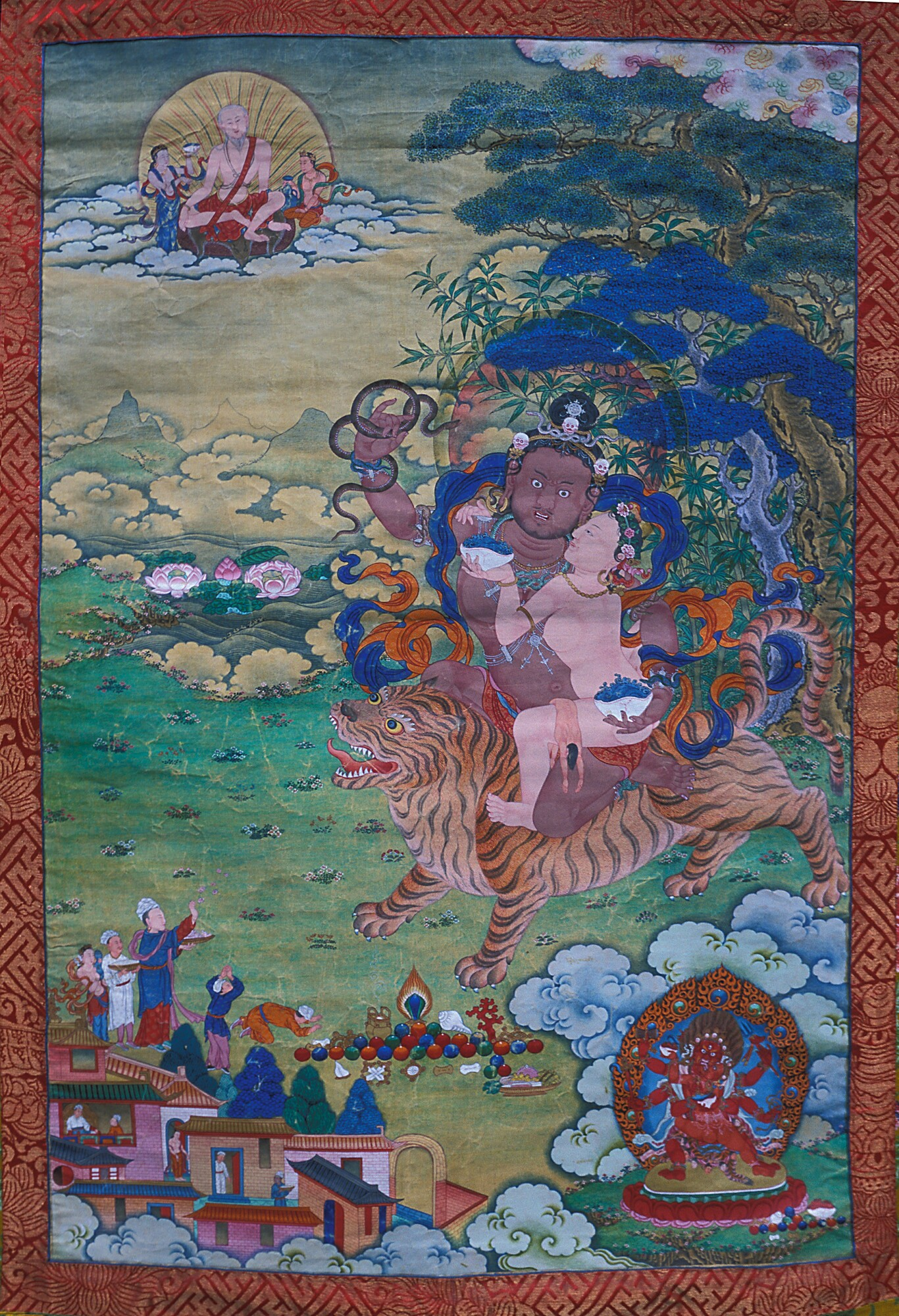
19th century painting of Dombi Heruka returning to the capital with his consort, as citizens bow to him.

The king returned riding a pregnant tigress, in copulation with his consort and with a snake in his hand as the whip. Since he had lived with an outcaste woman, he declared that he become impure and requested the people to burn him and his consort on a pyre from which he would be reborn. After the sandalwood pyre burnt for a week, the mahasiddha and his consort appeared from the embers as a divine couple in union, like the deity Hevajra. The people bowed to the mahasiddha, calling him Dombipa, "the Lord of the Dombi". He told his subjects to emulate him or he would leave them. While the people refused, the mahasiddha denounced political power in a sermon and flew to the Dakini's Paradise.

The account by Taranatha (1575–1634) mirrors Abhayadatta Sri's account, with some variation. Dombi is described as king of Tripura here. Instead of his fire ritual, Dombi wandered with his consort. In Radha, he flew on his tiger, with snakes leading the king and his subjects to convert to Buddhism. In Karnataka, he taught almost 500 yogic disciples, who earned siddhi. In another place in South India, he persuaded people to shun animal sacrifice.

As per Trungpa legend, Dombi Heruka was a Brahmin born to a local chieftain, living in India. He studied the mahamudra philosophy of Buddhism. He took an outcaste girl as his tantric consort, to the displeasure of his parents. Dombi Heruka became an "accomplished siddha", spending his time having coitus with the consort and drinking seven gallons of chhaang alcohol on his house's rooftop. When his parents decided to end Dombi Heruka's lifestyle by arresting him, the mahasiddha flew into the air with consort, kicking the alcohol jar. An endless alcohol stream flowed from the jar, flooding the entire village. While the villagers were about to perish by drowning, the terrified parents pleaded to Dombi Heruka to forgive them. The mahasiddha sang a Tibetan song starting with "He who knows the nature of the mind, does not know the nature of confusion" and converted his parents and the village to Buddhism. Then, he left his palace with his consort, riding a tiger. In the jungle, people are said to see him riding a tiger in an inebriated state.

== Teachers and disciples ==
While most sources agree that Virupa is his guru, some suggest that Luipa may have also taught him.

Taranatha states that Dombi Heruka had ten disciples, chief among them Alalavajra, Garbaripa, Jayashri, and Rahulavajra. G(h)arbaripa (identified with the mahasiddha Dharmapa) and Krishnacharya (sometimes described his guru) are also described his disciples.

== Works ==
Though Dombi Heruka wrote few works, they are considered important. The Shri-sahaja-siddhi is a condensed version of the Hevajra Tantra. He also wrote the Kurukulla-kalpa and Ekavira-sadhana.

== Legacy ==
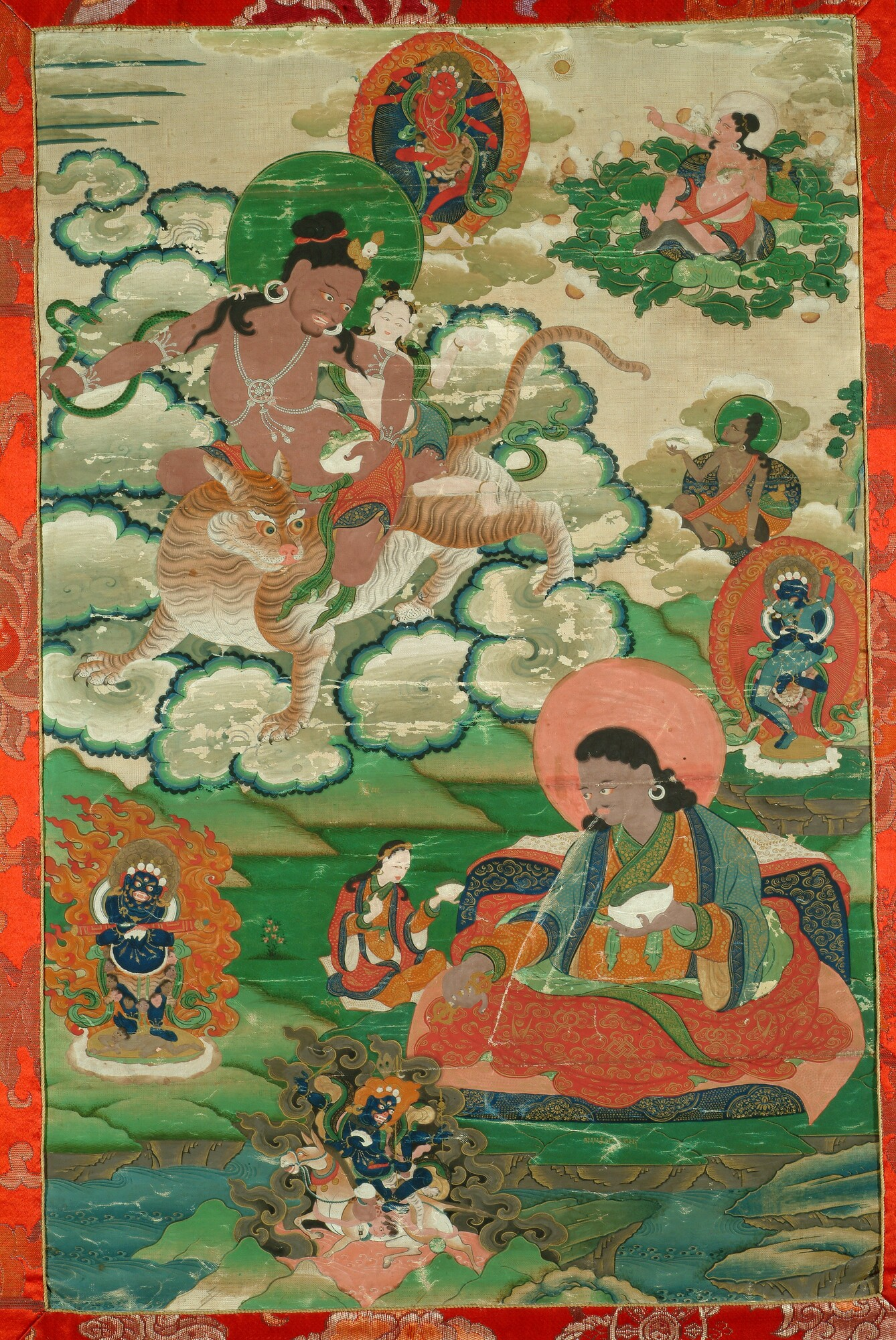
Dombi Heruka (left) and Marpa Chokyi Lodro are both considered pre-incarnations of the Longol lamas.

The lama lineage of Trungpa tulkus are believed to be reincarnations of Dombi Heruka. As per Trungpa legend, Dombi Heruka once threw his skull cap in the air from India and decreed that he would reincarnate when the cup fell. It fell at Surmang in Tibet, where the Surmang monastery – the seat of the Trungpa tulkas –- was founded.

Another lama lineage claiming Dombi Heruka are the Gelugpa Longdol Lamas, most prominent of them is Marpa Chokyi Lodro. The Tai Situpa lamas from the Karma Kagyu school are also incarnations of Dombi Heruka, besides of the deity Maitreya.

== Iconography ==
Dombi Heruka is depicted in art as single works or series works, pertaining to the eighty-four mahasiddhas or the lama lineages he is associated with.

Dombi Heruka is easily identifiable among the eighty-four mahasiddhas due to his unique iconography. He is depicted riding a tiger. The mahasiddhas are depicted iconographically in three types: a layman, a monk and a siddha (heruka). Dombi Heruka's iconography mirrors that of a heruka, who are depicted wearing bone ornaments and in unique "contrived and contorted postures".

In paintings, Dombi Heruka is depicted riding a tiger, embracing his consort. Both of them may be depicted naked. Sometimes, Dombi Heruka may wear a loincloth. Both of them wear a crown adorned with skulls, bone or gold ornaments and jewelled earrings. In his raised right hand, he holds poisonous snake as a whip. The hood of the snake is visible. His left arm may hold the consort; he may hold a skull cup filled with elixir. Alternately, his hand may show a fierce mudra (gesture). The consort holds a filled skull cup in her left hand. A corpse may be depicted on her thigh. The couple astride the tiger may be depicted in the forest or leaving the forest and triumphantly entering the capital. In the latter scene, Dombi Heruka's subjects may be seen bowing before him and making offering of food. In sculpture and paintings, the mahasiddha may be depicted alone on the tiger, without a consort.
