= Songs of realization =

Form of Tantric Poetry

Songs of realization, or Songs of Experience (Tibetan: ཉམས་མགུར, Wylie: nyams mgur; Devanāgarī: दोहा; Romanized Sanskrit: Dohā; Oriya: ପଦ), are sung poetry forms characteristic of the tantric movement in both Vajrayana Buddhism and in Hinduism. Doha is also a specific poetic form. Various forms of these songs exist, including caryagiti (Sanskrit: caryāgīti), or 'performance songs' and vajragiti (Sanskrit: vajragīti, Tibetan: rDo-rje mgur ), or 'diamond songs', sometimes translated as vajra songs and doha (Sanskrit: dohā, दोह, 'that which results from milking the cow'), also called doha songs, distinguishing them from the unsung Indian poetry form of the doha. According to Roger Jackson, caryagiti and vajragiti "differ generically from dohās because of their different context and function"; the doha being primarily spiritual aphorisms expressed in the form of rhyming couplets whilst caryagiti are stand-alone performance songs and vajragiti are songs that can only be understood in the context of a ganachakra or tantric feast. Many collections of songs of realization are preserved in the Tibetan Buddhist canon, however many of these texts have yet to be translated from the Tibetan language.

Although many of the songs of realization date from the mahasiddha of India, the tradition of composing mystical songs continued to be practiced by tantric adepts in later times and examples of spontaneously composed verses by Tibetan lamas exist up to the present day, an example being Khenpo Tsultrim Gyamtso Rinpoche. The most famous Tibetan composer of songs of realization is Milarepa, the 11th century Tibetan yogi whose mgur bum, or 'The Hundred Thousand Songs of Milarepa' remains a source of instruction and inspiration for Tibetan Buddhists, particularly those of the kagyu school.

== Caryagiti songs ==
A renowned collection of Buddhist caryagiti, or mystical songs, is the Charyapada, a palm-leaf manuscript of the 8th-12th century text having been found in the early 20th century in Nepal. Another copy of the Charyapada was preserved in the Tibetan Buddhist canon. Miranda Shaw describes how caryagiti were an element of the ritual gathering of practitioners in a tantric feast:

The feast culminates in the performance of tantric dances and music that must never be disclosed to outsiders. The revelers may also improvise "songs of realization" (caryagiti) to express their heightened clarity and blissful raptures in spontaneous verse.

== Doha songs ==
Ann Waldman describes this poetry form:

the doha, a song of realization that acknowledges an encounter with a master teacher, traditionally a guru or lama, and explores a particular wisdom or teaching transmitted through a kind of call-and-response duet format.

An example of a Doha song available in English translation, is by Rangjung Dorje (1284–1339). The Doha song is entitled Distinguishing Consciousness from Wisdom (Wylie: rnam shes ye shes ‘byed pa). The 2001 translation includes a commentary by Thrangu Rinpoche.

== See also ==
- Charyapada
- Lawapa
- Mahamudra
- Mahasiddha
- Milarepa

== Bibliography ==
Collections of songs of realization:

- Jackson, Roger (2004). Tantric Treasures:Three Collections of Mystical Verse from Buddhist India. USA: Oxford University Press. p. 10. ISBN 978-0-19-516640-8.
- Dowman, Keith (1986). Masters of Mahamudra: Songs and Histories of the Eighty-four Buddhist Siddhas. New York: SUNY Press. ISBN 978-0-88706-160-8.
- Milarepa: Songs on the Spot, translated by Nicole Riggs, Dharma Cloud Press, 2003, ISBN 0-9705639-30
- Milarepa, The Hundred Thousand Songs of Milarepa, translated by Garma C.C. Chang, City Lights Books, 1999, ISBN 1-57062-476-3
- The Yogi's Joy: Songs of Milarepa Sangharakshita, Windhorse Publications, 2006, ISBN 1-899579-66-4
- Drinking the Mountain Stream: Songs of Tibet's Beloved Saint, Wisdom Publications, ISBN 0-86171-063-0
- Rinpoche, Thrangu (1997). Songs of Naropa:Commentaries on Songs of Realization. Rangjung Yeshe Publications. ISBN 978-962-7341-28-4.
- Guenther, Herbert V. The Royal Song of Saraha: A Study in the History of Buddhist Thought. a.) University of Washington Press, 1970. ISBN 0-295-78552-7 b.) New paperback edition, Shambhala Publications, 1973. ISBN 0-394-73007-0
- Guenther, Herbert V.; Ecstatic Spontaneity: Saraha's Three Cycles of Doha Asian Humanities Press, 1993. ISBN 0-89581-933-3
