= Doha (Indian literature) =

Indian verse format used since 6th century

Doha is a lyrical verse-format which was extensively used by Indian poets and bards of North India probably since the beginning of the 6th century AD. Dohas of Kabir, Tulsidas, Raskhan, Rahim and the dohas of Nanak called Sakhis are famous. Satasai of Hindi poet, Bihārī, contains many dohas. Dohas are written even now.

== Background ==
Doha is a very old "verse-format" of Indian poetry. It is an independent verse, a couplet, the meaning of which is complete in itself. As regards its origin, Hermann Jacobi had suggested that the origin of doha can be traced to the Greek Hexametre, that it is an amalgam of two hexametres in one line. This format had found favour with the Abhiras or Ahirs who had greatly encouraged its use, the Abhiras belonged to Gandhara region now in Pakistan. Jacobi's theory rests on the premise that the Indians possessed a translation of Homer's works as asserted by Dio of Alexandria. Therefore, for a very long time the doha verse-format was popularly used in Gujarati, Rajasthani (Duha), Maithili, Marathi and Hindi folk and modern literature of North India and in Sindhi (Doho) literature of Pakistan. The word doha is supposed to have derived from the Sanskrit words dogdhaka, dvipadi, dvipathaka or dodhaka that are all Sanskrit couplet forms; it is also known as duhaviya in Apabhraṃśa to which the earliest reference is in Vikramorvashiyam of Kalidasa. Dohas have also been found written and cited in a stray manner in older languages such as Prakrit and Pali. They are quotations of worldly wisdom. In Duhasuktavali it is said that doha should be quoted where talented persons have gathered.

Doha (Apabhraṃśa) is a particular kind of Apabhraṃśa metre of popular origin that was cultivated by many Apabhraṃśa saints – poets and bards owing to its lyrical qualities, and who gave birth to the doha – sahitya i.e. doha-literature. Dohas in Sant literature are known as Sakhis. A doha has two lines, each having 13+11 morae (6+4+3) + (6+4+1) and with its last words ending in a rhyme; it is one of the shortest quantitative metres of Hindi literature. This format has been employed freely since 6th century AD and are seen quoted by Svayambhudeva (circa 800 AD) in his Paumachariu and Harivamshapurana and by Hemchandra (1088–1172) of Patan, Gujarat in his Siddhahema shabdanushashna, a work on grammar of Sanskrit, Prakrit and Apabhraṃśa. The great saint-poet Gorakhnath (809–849) for his Gorakh-bani and the great poet Pushpadanta (959–972) of Manyakheta for his epics Mahapurana, Nayakumara-chariu, Adipurana, Jaisahara-chariu and Uttarapurana chose this particular format.

== Compositions ==
There was a tradition of composing stray verses in doha metre, more popular in North India it was popularised through contributions made by the Jainas, the Brahmins and the Muslims as is seen in epic, rasa and didactic type of literature. Topics in this literature include eroticism, valour, quietude, morality, common life, eventful scenes, of nature, sayings and proverbs. Some main literary works of the period from the 8th to 13th centuries are Sarasvatikanthabharana and Shringaraprakasha of Bhoja, Kavyalankara of Rudrta, Prakritavyakrana of Hemchandra, Prakritapaingalam and Neminathachariu of Haribhadra, Kumarapalapratibodha of Somaprabha, Prabandhachintamani of Merutanga, Sandeshrasaka of Abdul Rahman.

Religious doha-literature was composed by Buddhists, Jainas and Shaivas which was both, spiritual and moralist. The spiritual doha-literature is devoid of artificial style and is mystico-religious in which symbols are employed and importance of teacher-preacher is emphasised; its authors were saints first and poets afterwards. Its poetic value though not high was sincere in feelings and emotions. Natha, Santa, Sahajiya and Vaishnava schools were then very popular.

== Buddhist contribution ==
It is traditionally held that Bauddha-dohas were composed by the eighty-four Bauddha Mahasiddhas. Buddhist or bauddha-dohas of Sarahapa (760–806), Sabarapa, Luipa, Darikapa, Kanhapa, and Śāntipa, all belonging to the period from the 8th to 12th centuries, are of two types – a) that which establishes and explains sectarian teachings and philosophy, and b) that which criticises Rituals, tantricism and mantravada; both represent two modes viz., Vajrayana (thunder-bolt) describing spiritual states and experiences, and Sahajayana (natural and easy) preaching purification of life and criticise Hindu and Jaina practices,

== Jaina contribution ==
Jaina doha-literature mainly deals with spiritualism and the supreme self, internal purification, control of the mind and the senses and opposes external ritualism, charms, tantricism, worship of deities and scriptures. Some important Jaina works are Paramātmaprakāśa and Yogasara of Joindu Yogindra, Pāhuḍadoha of Ramasimha, Vairagyasara of Suprabhacharya and Dohaprabhrita of Muni Mahachandra. Didactic dohas of Jainas preach the need to raise the moral standard of life, lay stress on duties and obligations, charity etc., Shavakadharmadoha of Devasena of Dhar (9th century AD) and Sanjama-manjari of Maheshvarasuri belong to this kind.

== Brahmanical contribution ==
Brahmanical doha-literature is available in Tantrasara and Pratrimshikavrriti of Abhinavagupta which are Sanskrit texts on Kashmiri Shaivism.

== Hindi dohas ==
Hindi doha is matrik-ardha-sama-chhanda metre and have odd and even feet of the same rhythm but the attempt to find a proper identification of the rhythm is evident in all works from Chhandamala of Keshavdas (1557–1637) to Chhanda-prabhakara of Jagannathprasad Bhanu (1859–1945). Hindi doha-literature is marked by Pahur-doha of the Jain-muni Ram Singh, Bhaviayatt-kaha of Dhanapala, Sandesha-rasaka of Abdul Rahman and Prithviraj Raso of Chand Bardai, and later by works of Khusro, Kabir, Tulsidas, Nanak, Dadu Dayal, Malukdas, Malik Mohammad Jayasi, Raskhan and Abdul Rahim Khan-I-Khana. Kabir and Tulsidas used the Maithili doha metre, and the great Chishti Sufi shaykh of the thirteenth century Baba Farid (Farid ud Din Ganj-i Shakar; d. 1265) is widely remembered today for his Punjabi dohas.

== Sindhi dohos ==
Doha or doho is an important part of Sindhi literature. M.Jotwani had traced the Arabic two-lined bait to the likes of doha, baro doha soratha and tunveri duho. The main strain of Sindhi literature has been Sufi-Vedantic poetry in the form of doha or beit that could be sung.
