= Dadar (ritual tool) =

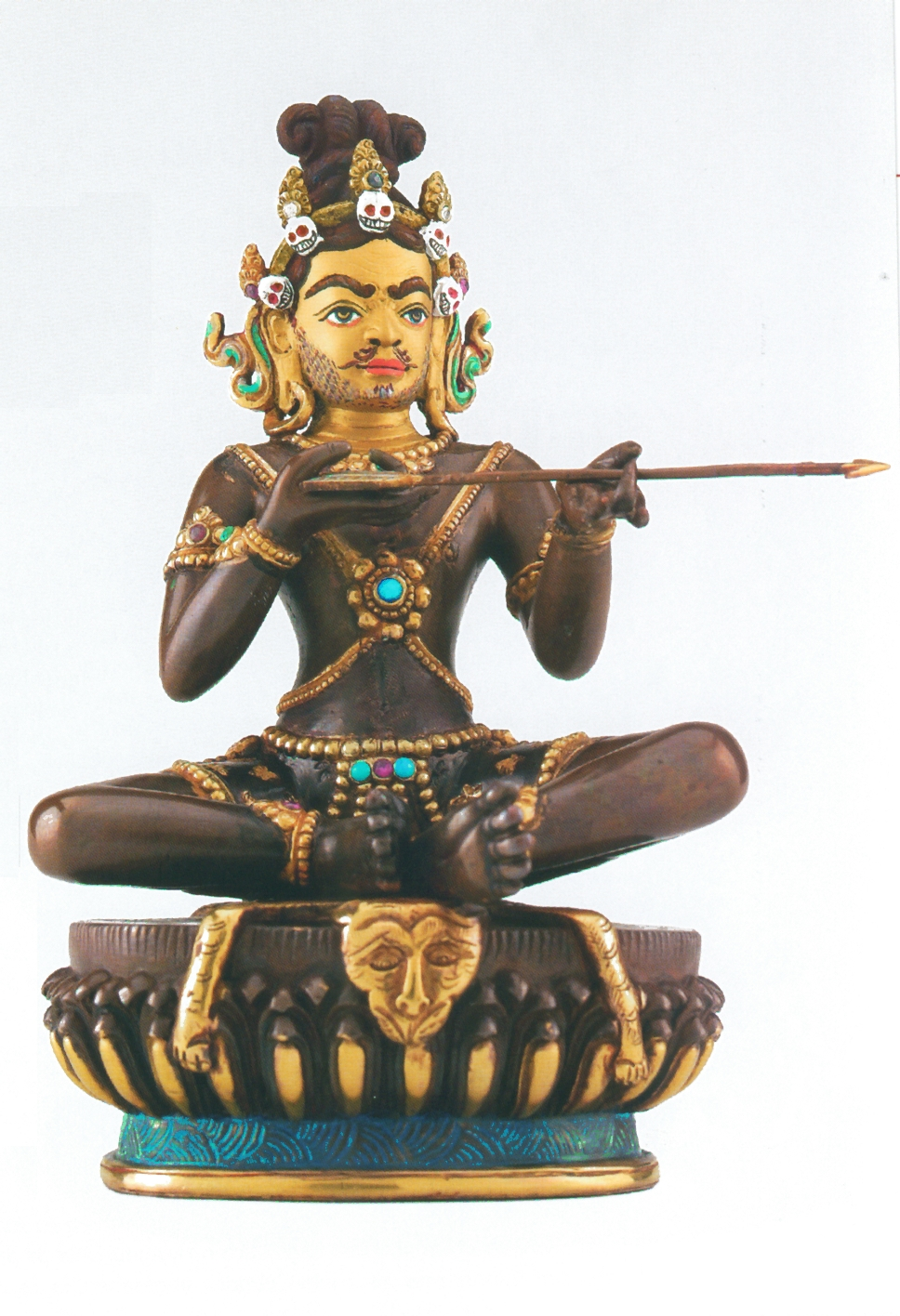
Saraha is often icongraphically depicted holding an arrow, which is mda'

The Dadar (Tibetan; Wylie: mda' dar), or arrow often though not always dressed with rainbow ribbon, is a teaching tool, ritual instrument symbol for Nyingmapa and Bonpo Dzogchenpa and is a particular attribute for Mandarava and Saraha.

An aphorism "to shoot the arrow" of Jigme Lingpa is rendered into English by Gyatso (1998: p. 85); it refers:

...to the need to seek students with whom there is a "karmic connection"; the point is that the bodhisattva cannot always be helpful to everyone, and so one should direct one's efforts at those who are already predisposed to one. Khanpo Palden Sherab commented that the tantric master does not remain isolated but wanders in the world and occasionally is on the mark, that is, has the satisfaction of helping others attain buddhahood.

Simmer-Brown (2001: p. 359) asserts that linguistic devices, such as a pun, are common teaching tools in tantra and vajrayana and provides the following homonymic example:

The word for arrow is mda', which is identical in pronunciation to the word for symbol, brda'.

== See also ==
- Iconography
