= Dadra, Jaunpur =

Village in Uttar Pradesh, India

Coordinates: 20°19′N 72°58′E

Dadra is a village in Jaunpur, Uttar Pradesh, India.
