= Dadar, Raigad district =

Dadar, Raigad district Dadar
- Census town
- Location in Maharashtra, India
- Coordinates: 18.803212°N 73.035336°E
- Country: India
- State: Maharashtra
- District: Raigad
- Elevation: 13 m (43 ft)

Population
  - Total: 14,568

Languages
  - Official: Marathi, English
- Time zone: UTC+5:30 (IST)
- PIN: 402107
- Telephone code: 02143

Dadar is a Census Town situated in Pen taluka Raigad district of Maharashtra, India. The Pen railway station serves as the nearest railway station and is located approximately 14 kilometers away from Dadar.

== Geography ==
The total geographical area of the Dadar census town is 9 square kilometers which makes it the biggest census town by area in the pen taluka.

== Demographics ==
The total population of Dadar consists of 5389 people, which makes it the biggest census town by area in the Raigad district.

== Climate ==
The average rainfall per annum in the town is 2164.5 millimeters and the maximum temperature is 36.7°C and the minimum temperature is 13.5°C.
