= Saraha =

Indian poet

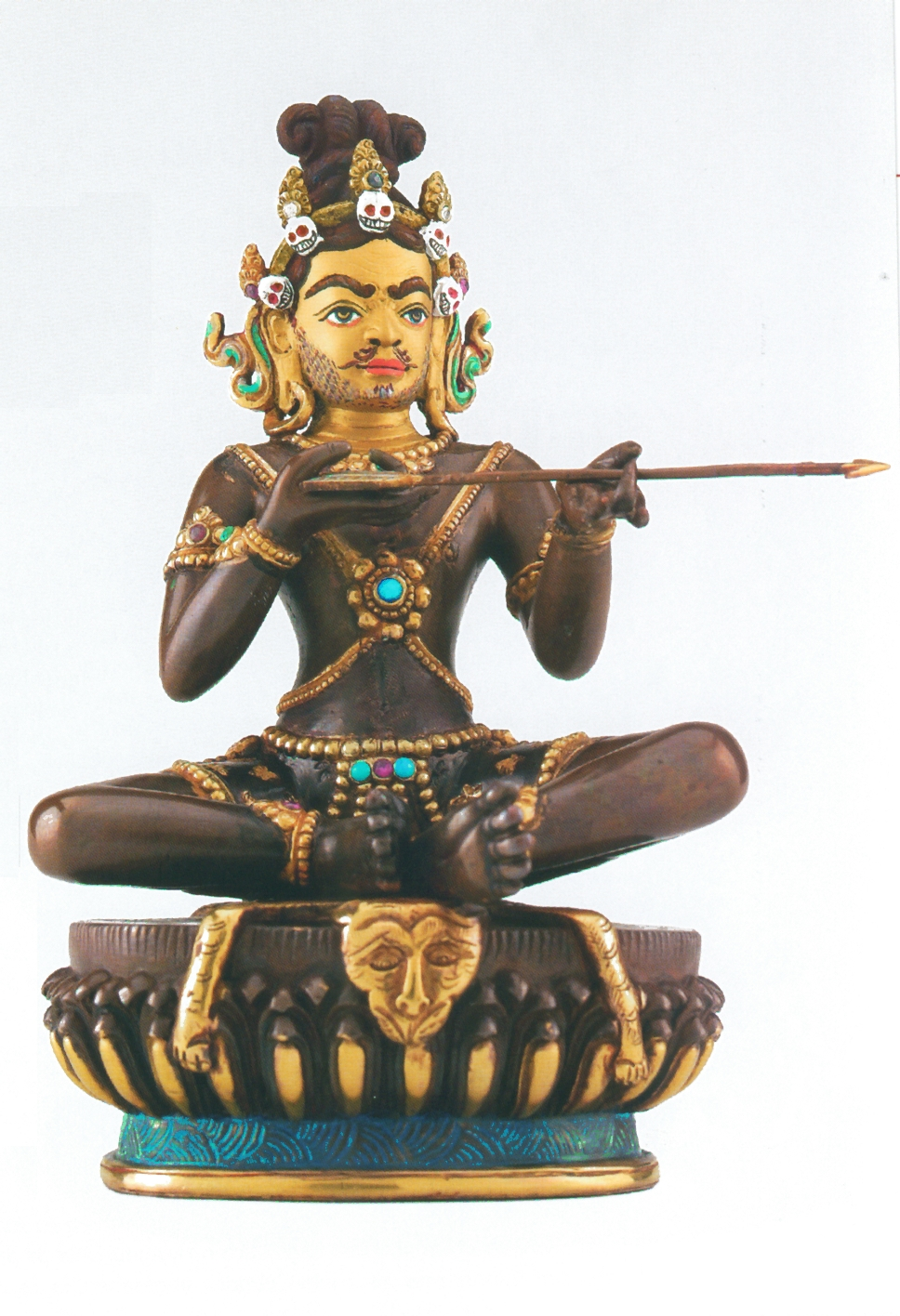
A contemporary bronze image of Saraha holding an arrow, probably made in Nepal (arte Newar)

Saraha,Sarhappa, Sarahapa, Sarahapāda (Tibetan: མདའ་བསྣུན་, Wylie: mda' bsnun, THL: danün, lit. 'The Archer'; c. 8th century CE) was an Indian Buddhist Mahasiddha and poet. The name Saraha means "the one who has shot the arrow.". According to one, scholar, "This is an explicit reference to an incident in many versions of his biography when he studied with a dakini disguised as a low-caste arrow smith. Metaphorically, it refers to one who has shot the arrow of non duality into the heart of duality."

Saraha is considered to be one of the founders of Vajrayana Buddhism, particularly the Mahāmudrā tradition associated with the mind teachings of Tibet.

Saraha was originally known as Rāhula or Rāhulabhadra and was born in Roli, a region of the city-state of Rajni in eastern India, into a Shakya family and studied at the Buddhist monastic university Nalanda.

== The Arrow Making Dakini ==
Saraha is normally shown seated and holding an arrow (Skt. śaru). It is from a mature nameless woman, often called the Arrow Smith Dakini or the Arrow Making Dakini, who was Saraha's teacher and consort, that the typical iconography of Saraha holding an arrow emerges. Some versions of their meeting say that Saraha saw the Arrow Making Dakini in a vision and thus was wandering here and there, searching her out. Some say they met at a crossroads, while other versions say that it was in a busy marketplace where she was selling her arrows.

Whether they meet in a marketplace or a crossroads, it is this woman's intense concentration and spiritual instructions to Saraha that are transformative. When he finds her, Saraha inquires about what she is doing. Her reply to him is pith and direct: "The Buddha's meaning can be known through symbols and actions, not through words and books."

The Arrow Making Dakini then explained the symbolic meaning of the arrow to him using the elusive tantric twilight language that is common to Dakini teachings. It is said, that in this moment, Saraha fully realized the state of mahamudra and at that moment he said the single syllable "da." This is a play on the sound of this word, which can mean either "arrow" or "symbol" (dadar or mda' dar in Tibetan). Saraha then recognized the wisdom Dakini in front of him, abandoned his studies and monastic vows, and moved to a cremation ground with her to practice

As an homage to the Arrow Making Dakini and Saraha and their great spiritual accomplishments, and to bring forth the blessings of these spiritual lineages, contemporary tantric communities are engaging in archery and arrow smithing as a form of spiritual discipline and practice.

== The Radish Curry Dakini ==
The second nameless woman who was Saraha's teacher and consort is often called the Radish Curry Girl or the Radish Curry Dakini. Saraha met her when she was just 15 years old and it is likely she had been working as a servant. The story that provides this accomplished dakini with the epithet Radish Curry Girl also has several versions. One of the more well-known ones states that Saraha asked this young woman to make him a radish curry one day. While she was doing this, Saraha fell into meditation. His meditative absorption was so complete that he remained in samadhi for twelve years.

When he emerged from meditation, he asked the young woman if he could have some of the radish curry twelve long years later. Her direct replies to him are the teachings. She said: "You sit in samadhi for twelve years and the first thing you ask for is radish curry?"

Saraha noted her wisdom and realized his own faults in meditative practice. He decided that the only way for him to make any progress on the spiritual path would be to move into an isolated mountain location, away from all distractions.

Again, the Radish Curry Dakini offered pith instructions to Saraha: "If you awaken from samadhi with an undiminished desire for radish curry, what do you think the isolation of the mountains will do for you? The purest solitude," she counseled, "is one that allows you to escape from the preconceptions and prejudices, from the labels and concepts of a narrow, inflexible mind."

Saraha was wise enough to listen carefully to the wisdom of this dakini in front of him, realizing that she was indeed not just his consort but also his teacher. From that moment forward, his meditative practices changed and he eventually attained the supreme realization of mahamudra. At the time of his death, both Saraha and his consort ascended to Dakini Pure Lands.

== Disciples ==
Luipa was a pupil of Saraha.

== Doha, Caryagiti, and Vajragiti ==
In the oral and literary traditions of South Asia, there are at least three classifications for the tantric compositions and teachings of Saraha: doha (poetic couplets), caryagiti (performance songs), and vajragiti (adamantine songs, which are classified according to the content, not the form).

As Braitstein writes:

Saraha's transmission does not consist merely in his presence--past and present--but also in the corpus of his work. As befits a mahasiddha, his method of teaching was spontaneous, inspired, and challenging. Saraha is said to have uttered collections of esoteric verses designed to directly point to the nature of mind and reality. Despite the size of the corpus (there are twenty-four works attributed to him in the Tengyur alone, the only ones that have received any serious attention to date are his Doha Trilogy (Doha score sum; grub snying), a trilogy of songs that have eclipsed everything else attributed to the master Saraha. His King and People dohas have been translated numerous times into English and into other Western languages and have been the subject of major studies. Saraha's Adamantine Songs, however, have scarcely been touched.

Doha is a form of couplet poetry and a portion of Saraha's doha are compiled in Dohakośa, the 'Treasury of Rhyming Couplets'. Pada (verses) 22, 32, 38 and 39 of Caryagītikośa (or Charyapada) are assigned to him. The script used in the doha shows close resemblance with the present-day Bengali–Assamese, Tirhuta and Odia scripts which imply that Sarahapa has compiled his literature in the earlier language which has similarity with all Assamese, Bengali, Maithili and Odia languages.

Resemblance of Odia script in Dohakosa by Sarahapada

In the disputed opinion of Rahul Sankrityayan, Sarahapāda was the earliest Siddha or Siddhācārya and the first poet of Bengali, Odia, Maithili and Hindi literature . According to him, Sarahapāda was a student of Haribhadra, who was, in turn, a disciple of Śāntarakṣita, the noted Buddhist scholar who traveled to Tibet. As Śāntarakṣita is known to have lived in the mid-8th century from Tibetan historical sources and Haribhadra was a contemporary of Pāla king Dharmapala (770 – 815 CE), Sarahapāda must have lived in the late 8th century or early 9th-century CE. From the colophon of a manuscript of Saraha's Dohakośa, copied in Nepali Samvat 221 (1101 CE) and found from Royal Durbar Library in Nepal (most probably the earliest manuscript of Dohakośa), by Pt. Haraprasad Shastri in 1907, we know that many doha-s of Saraha were extant by that time. Thanks to the efforts of a scholar named Divakar Chanda, some of them have been preserved., and were printed and published first in the modern Bangla font by the Bangiya Sahitya Parishad in 1916 along with the Dohakosh of Sarahapa in Bangla font, the Sanskrit notes of the dohas of Sarahapa also in the Bangla font, the Dakarnab adage-poems, the dohas of Kanhapa or Krishnacharyapa or Kanifnath and the Mekhla notes. The mouthpiece was by Haraprasad Shastri who had found the manuscript at the Royal Durbar Library of the Nepal kingdom in 1907.

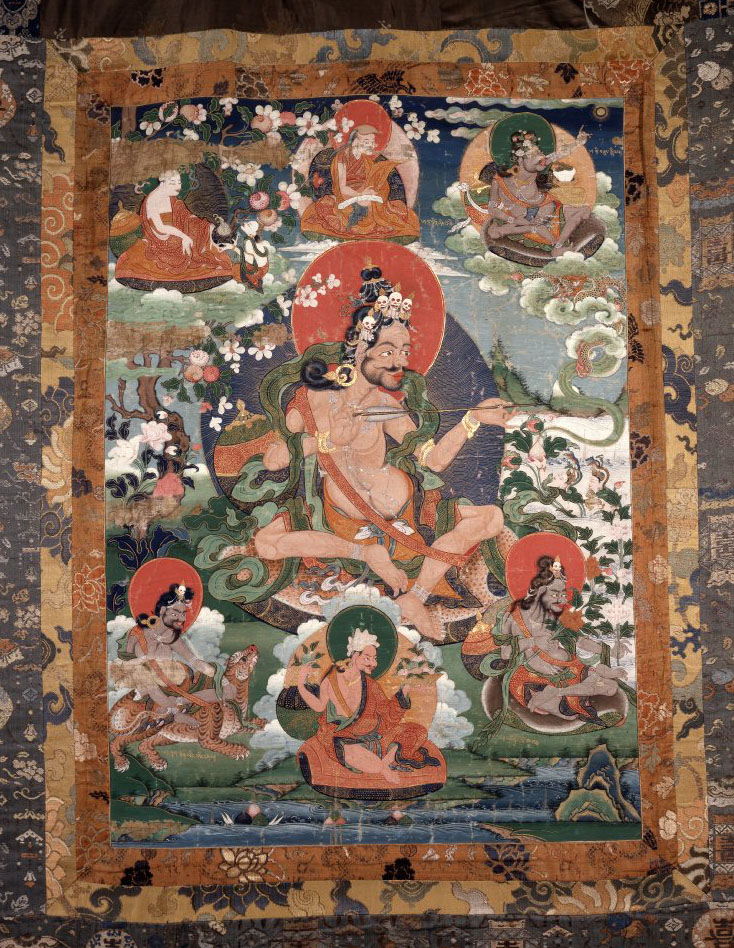
A scroll painting of Saraha, surrounded by other Mahāsiddhas, probably 18th century and now in the British Museum

The following song and poem of Saraha are from the original Apabhramsa (the language Saraha most often wrote in) is no longer extant but we have the Tibetan translation:

Tibetan in Wylie transcription:
la la nam mkha'i khams la rtog par snang
gzhan yang stong nyid ldan par byed pa de
phal cher mi mthun phyogs la zhugs pa yin

English translation
Some think it's
in the realm of space,
others connect it
with emptiness:
mostly, they dwell
in contradiction.

Here is one scholarly interpretation of the above verses:

" space: In Indian thought, especially Buddhist, a common metaphor for the objective nature of reality as empty or unlimited, and the subjective quality of the mind that experiences that emptiness...Space also is one of the five elements recognized in most Indian cosmologies, along with earth, water, fire, and air. In certain contexts... "sky" is a more appropriate translation for the Apabhramsa or Tibetan original. emptiness: According to most Mahayana Buddhist schools, the ultimate nature of all entities and concepts in the cosmos, realization of which is required for attaining liberation. Emptiness (Skt. śūnyatā) may be regarded negatively as the absence, anywhere, of anything resembling a permanent, independent substance or nature...more positively, it is regarded as the mind's natural luminosity, which is "empty" of the defilements that temporarily obscure...The critical remarks directed here at those who think "it" (i.e., reality) is connected with emptiness presumably are meant to correct a one-sided obsession with negation, which is one of Saraha's major targets."

The point of Saraha in this poem is clearly to ensure that the aspirant on way to becoming adept, does not get trapped by the metaphor and soteriological lexicon. This was a recurrent motif in Saraha's teachings and is key for why he is depicted in Tibetan iconography with an 'arrow' or 'dadar' (Tibetan: mda' dar). Further to this, the comment of scholar Judith Simmer-Brown (2001: p. 359) as follows is relevant: "The word for arrow is mda', which is identical in pronunciation to the word for symbol, brda'".

== Works Attributed to Saraha in the Tibetan Tengyur ==
There are a number of songs of realization attributed to the Indian Buddhist yogi Saraha in the Tengyur of the Tibetan Buddhist canon:

rgyud vol Ra.
104b–150a To. 1652: Śrī Buddhakapālatantrapañjikā jñāna vatī nāma (trans: Gayadhara, Jo Zla ba'i 'od zer)
225b–229b To. 1655: Śrī Buddhakapālasādhana nāma (trans: Gayadhara, Gyi jo Zla ba'i 'od zer)
229b–230b To. 1656: Sarvabhūtabalividhi (trans: Gayadhara, Gyi jo Zla ba'i 'od zer)
230b–243b To. 1657: Śrī Buddhakapālamaṇḍalavidhikrama pradyotana nāma (trans: Gayadhara, Gyi ja Zla ba'i 'od zer)

rgyud vol Wi.
70b–77a To. 2224: Dohakoṣagīti - do ha mdzod kyi glu - "People Doha" (trans: ?)

- colophon: rnal 'byor gyi dbang phyug chen po dpal sa ra ha chen po'i zhal snga nam mdzad pa do ha mdzod ces bya ba de kho na nyid rnal du mtshon pa don dam pa'i yi ge rdzogs so/

rgyud vol Zhi (Ui: Shi)
26b–28b To. 2263: Dohakoṣa nāma caryāgīti - do ha mdzod ces bya ba spyod pa'i glu - "King Doha", "Royal Song" (trans: ?)

- colophon: rnal 'byor gyi dbang phyug chen po dpal sa ra ha'i zhal snga nas mdzad pa/ do ha mdzod ces bya ba spyod pa'i glu rdzogs so/

28b–33b To. 2264: Dohakoṣopadeśagīti nāma - mi zad pa'i gter mdzod man ngag gi glu zhes bya ba - "Queen Doha" (trans: Vajrapāṇi rev: Asu)

- colophon: rnal 'byor gyi dbang phyug dpal sa ra ha pas mdzad pa rdzogs so// //rgya gar gyi mkhan po badzra pāṇi dang/ bla ma a sus zhus//

55b–57b To. 2266: Kakhasyadoha nāma (Ui gives "Kakhadoha nama") (trans: Śrīvairocanavajra)
57b–65b To. 2267: Kakhadohaṭippaṇa (trans: Śrīvairocanavajra)
106b–113a To. 2269: Kāyakoṣāmṛtavajragīti (trans: ?)
113a–115b To. 2270: Vākkoṣarucirasvaravajragīti (trans: Nag po pa)
115b–117a To. 2271: Cittakoṣājavajragīti (trans: Nag po pa)
117a–122a To. 2272: Kāyavākcittāmanasikāra nāma (trans: Nag po pa)
122a–124a To. 2273: Dohakoṣa nāma mahāmudropadeśa (trans: Śrīvairocanarakṣita)
124a–125a To. 2274: Dvādaśopadeśagāthā (trans: ?)
125a–126a To. 2275: Svādhiṣṭhānakrama (trans: Śāntabhadra, rma ban chos 'bar)
126b–127b To. 2276: Tattvopadeśaśikharadohagīti nāma (trans: Kṛṣṇa Paṇḍit)

rgyud vol Zi
3a–4a To. 2345: Bhāvanādṛṣṭicaryāphaladohagītikā nāma (trans: ?)
5b–5b To. 2351: Vasantatilakadohakoṣagītikā nāma (trans: ?)
55b–62a To. 2440: Mahāmudropadeśavajraguhyagīti (trans: Kamalaśīla, ston pa seng ge rgyal po)

rgyud vol. Phu
182b–183a To. 3164: Trailokavaśaṃkaralokeśvarasādana (trans: Abhaya, tshul khrims rgyal mtshan)
183a–184a To. 3165: Trailokavaśaṃkaralokeśvarasādana (trans: Ratnākara, Tshul rgyal)

rgud vol. Mu
46b–47a To. 3371: Trailokavaśaṃkaralokiteśvarasādana (trans: Don yod rdo rje, Ba ri)
88a–88b To. 3427: Trailokavaśaṃkaralokeśvarasādana (trans: Grags pa rgyal mtshan)

== See also ==
- Songs of realization
- Mahasiddha
- Charyapada

== Books ==
- Guenther, Herbert V. The Royal Song of Saraha: A Study in the History of Buddhist Thought. a.) University of Washington Press, 1970. ISBN 0-295-78552-7 b.) New paperback edition, Shambhala Publications, 1973. ISBN 0-394-73007-0
- Jackson, Roger R.; Tantric Treasures: Three Collections of Mystical Verse from Buddhist India Oxford University Press, 2004. ISBN 0-19-516640-X; ISBN 0-19-516641-8 (pbk.).
- Osho: The Tantra Experience - Discourses on the Royal Song of Saraha. Osho Media International. ISBN 9780983640035. First edition 1978.
- Ray, Pranabesh Sinha. The Mystic Songs of Kanha and Saraha : The Doha-Kosa and the Carya. (translated into English from French) Kolkata, The Asiatic Society, 2007.
- Schaeffer, Kurtis R. Dreaming the Great Brahmin: Tibetan Traditions of the Buddhist Poet-Saint Saraha. Oxford University Press, USA: 2005. ISBN 0-19-517373-2.
- Rinpoche, Khenchen Thrangu. A Song for the King: Saraha on Mahamudra Meditation. (Michelle Martin, editor & translator; Peter O'Hearn, translator) Wisdom Publications, 2006. ISBN 0-86171-503-9
- Dowman, Keith. Masters of Enchantment: The Lives and Legends of the Mahasiddhas. Inner Traditions International, 1988. ISBN 978-0140191653
