= Abhayadatta Sri =

12th-century Indian Buddhist monk

Abhayadatta Sri (also known as Abhayadattaśrī or Abhayadāna) was a 12th-century Indian Buddhist monk notable for composing the Caturaśītisiddhapravrtti (the lives of the eighty-four mahasiddhas) which detailed the backgrounds of the mahasiddhas who were tantric masters. His work was later translated into Tibetan. His story on the lives of the mahasiddhas was influential in showing their highly unconventional paths to achieving realization.

He was a native of Campara which has been identified with modern-day Champaran district in Bihar, India. He was also a disciple of Vajrasana who was one of the last great siddhas of the eleventh century.
