= Taranatha =

Tibetan Lama

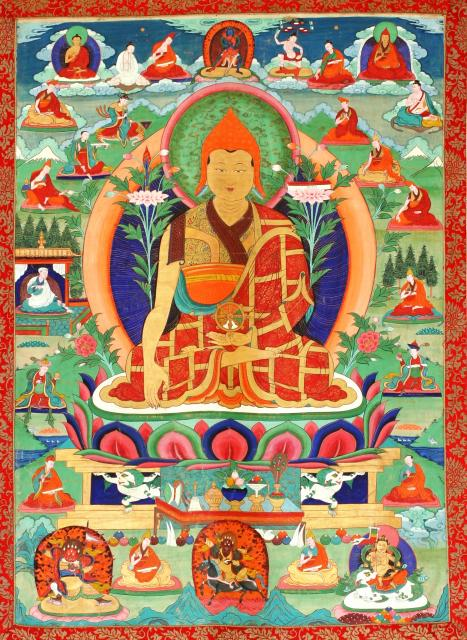
Traditional thangka rendering of Tārānātha

Tārānātha (1575–1634) was a lama of the Jonang school of Tibetan Buddhism. He is widely considered its most remarkable scholar and exponent.

Tārānātha was born in Tibet, supposedly on the birthday of Padmasambhava. His original name was Kun-dga'-snying-po, the Sanskrit equivalent of which is Anandagarbha. However, he adopted Tārānātha, the Sanskrit name by which he was generally known, as an indication of the value he placed on his Sanskrit scholarship in an era when mastery of the language had become much less common in Tibet than it had once been. He was also paying homage to his Indian teacher, Buddhaguptanātha.

His exceptional qualities are said to have been recognized by others at a young age, as is often the case with great masters. He studied under such masters as Je Draktopa, Yeshe Wangpo, Kunga Tashi and Jampa Lhundrup, although his primary teacher was Buddhaguptanatha.

Tārānātha was recognized by Khenchen Lungrik Gyatso as the rebirth of Krishnacarya and the Khenchen's own teacher, Jetsun Kunga Drolchok.

== Works ==
Taranatha was a prolific writer and a renowned scholar. His best known work is the 143-folio History of Buddhism in India (dpal dus kyi 'khor lo'i chos bskor gyi byung khungs nyer mkho) of 1608, which has been published in English. This work is considered as his magnum opus. It deals with the history of Buddhism in South Asia, beginning from the time of Ajatashatru upto the rise of Delhi Sultanate. Although relying on legends & word-of-mouth, he is found, in many cases, to provide confirmatory materials in support of events known from other authentic sources. The part of his work discussing the state of Buddhism after the fall of Harsha's empire until Bakhtiyar Khalji's invasion of Eastern India is considered extremely valuable. His information on the Pala Empire & Chandra dynasty of Bengal, the last Indian polities to patronize Vajrayana in India is also worth mention.

Other works are The Golden Rosary, Origins of the Tantra of the Bodhisattva Tara of 1604 which has also been translated into English. He was an advocate of the Shentong view of emptiness and wrote many texts and commentaries on this subject. English-language translation publications of his works on Shentong are The Essence of Other-Emptiness (which includes a translation of his Twenty One Profound Meanings (Zab don gсer gcig pa)) and his Commentary on the Heart Sutra. In 1614 Taranatha founded the important Jonangpa monastery Takten Dhamchöling, in the Tsangpo Valley about 200 miles west of Lhasa.

== Later life ==
Probably not long after 1614, Taranatha went to Mongolia, where he reportedly founded several monasteries. He died probably in Urga. His rebirth became known as Zanabazar, the 1st Bogd Gegeen and Jebtsundamba Khutuktu of Mongolia. His most recent reincarnation was the 9th Jebtsundamba Khutughtu, who died in 2012.

== See also ==
- Jonang
- Shentong
- Kalachakra
- Dolpopa Sherab Gyaltsen

== Sources ==
- Taranatha (auth.), Hopkins, Jeffrey (trans). The Essence of Other-Emptiness Snow Lion(2007). ISBN 1-55939-273-8
- Stearns, Cyrus. The Buddha from Dolpo: A Study of the Life and Thought of the Tibetan Master Dolpopa Sherab Gyaltsen. State University of New York Press (1999). ISBN 0-7914-4191-1 (hc); ISBN 0-7914-4192-X (pbk). -(contains fairly extensive information on Taranatha)
