= Kanhapa =

Indian poet

Kānhapā
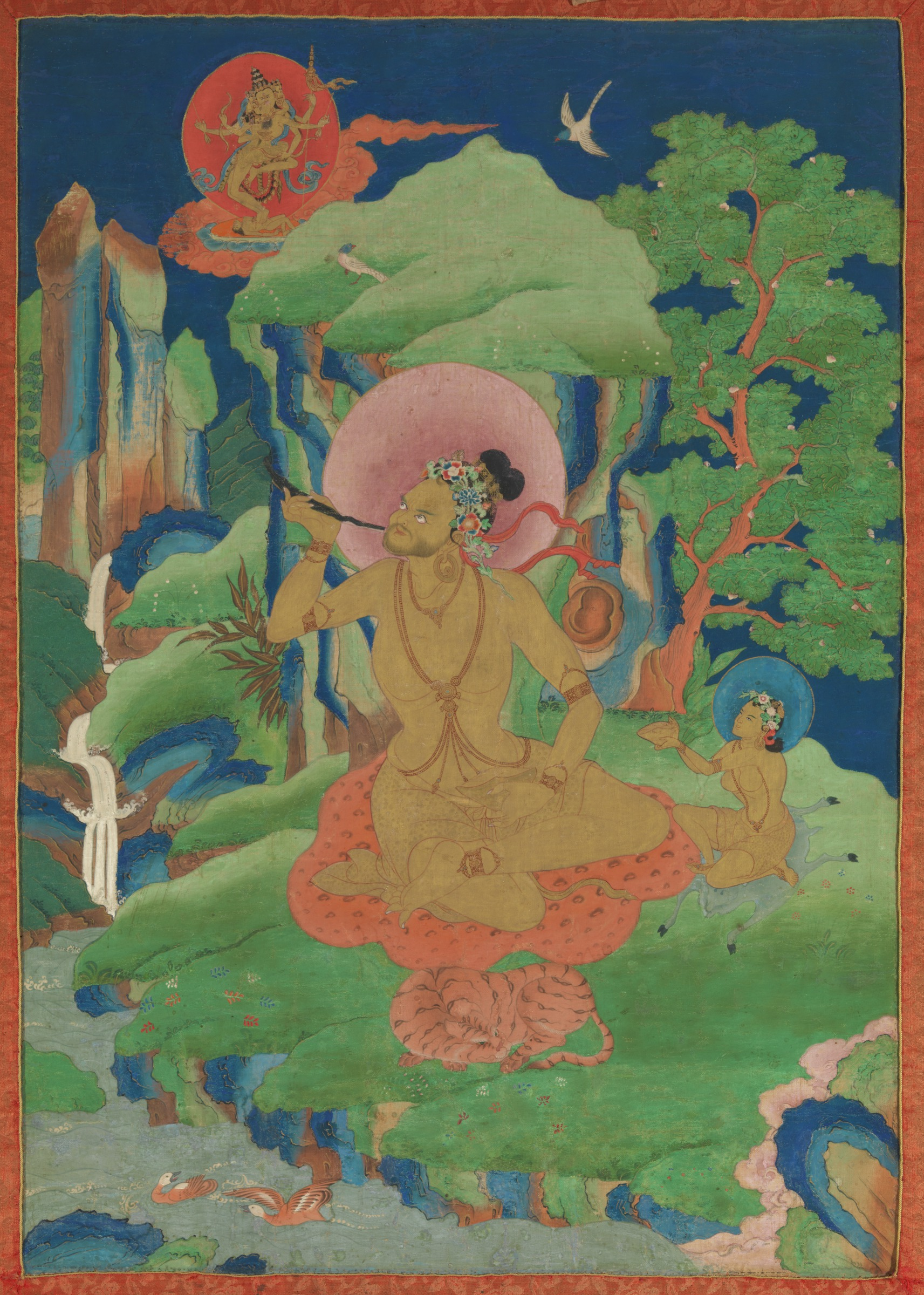
- Kanhapa, 8th centurt Buddhist Mahasiddha

Personal life
- Born: c. 10th century AD
- Notable work: Charyapada

Religious life
- Religion: Tantric Buddhism

Senior posting
- Teacher: Jalandhar
- Disciples: Nath Sampradaya (after Matsyendranatha and Gorakhnath)

Kānhapā, Kanha or Kanhapada or Krishnacharya ( c 10th century AD) was one of the main poets of Charyapada, the earliest known example of Assamese, Bengali, Magahi, Maithili, Bhojpuri, and Odia literature. He was a tantric Buddhist and a disciplle of Jalandhar.Page21 Kanhapada is also a prominent siddhacharya to Nath Sampradaya after Matsyendranatha and Gorakhnath. His poems in Charjyapad are written in a code, whereby every poem has a descriptive or narrative surface meaning but also encodes tantric Buddhist teachings. Some experts believe this was to conceal sacred knowledge from the uninitiated.

In one of his poems, Kanhupa wrote:

Your hut stands outside the city

Oh, untouchable maid

The bald Brahmin passes sneaking close by

Oh, my maid, I would make you my companion

Kanha is the kapali, a yogi

He is naked and has no disgust

There is a lotus with sixty-four petals

Upon that the maid will climb with this poor self and dance.

The language of Kanhupa's poetry bears a very strong resemblance to modern Bangla and Odia. For example,

eka so padamā caüṣaṭṭhī pākhur̤i . tahim̐ car̤i nācaï ḍombi bāpur̤i..

ଏକ ସୋ ପଦମା ଚଉଷଟ୍ଠୀ ପାଖୁଡ଼ି । ତହିଁ ଚଡ଼ି ନାଚଇ ଡୋମ୍ବି ବାପୁଡ଼ି ॥

এক সো পদমা চৌষট্‌ঠী পাখুড়ি । তহিঁ চড়ি নাচই ডোম্বি বাপুড়ি ॥

Padama (Padma:Lotus), Chausatthi (64), Pakhudi (petals) Tahin (there, in that), Charhi (climb/rise), nachai (dances), Dombi (a Bengali or Odia woman belonging to the scheduled caste, Domi/Domni), Bapuri (a Bangla and Odia word for 'poor fellow'; ‘বাপুর, বাপুড়া’)

Somewhat modern poetic Bangla would be, “একশো পদ্মে/পদমে চৌষট্টি পাকড়ি/পাখুড়ি। তাহে চড়িয়া/চড়ি নাচে ডোমি বাপুড়ি/বেচারি॥”

or

hā lo ḍombi to puchami sadabhābe. āisasi jāsi ḍombi kāhari nābem̐..

ହା ଲୋ ଡୋମ୍ବି ତୋ ପୁଛମି ସଦଭାବେ। ଆଇସସି ଜାସି ଡୋମ୍ବି କାହରି ନାବେଁ॥

হা লো ডোম্বি তো পুছমি সদভাবে। আইসসি যাসি ডোম্বি কাহরি নাবেঁ॥

The above verse hardly requires any translation to be understood in present-day Bengali or Odia.

Modern poetic Bengali version of it will be “হ্যাঁ লো ডোমনি/ডোমি, তোকে/তোয় পুঁছি/জিজ্ঞাসি/শুধাই সদ্ভাবে। আসিস-যাস ডোমি/ডোমনি কাহারে নায়/নাওয়ে”.
