= Chugan =

Chugan or Chowgan may refer to:

- Chovgan, ancient Persian equestrian sport, forerunner to polo
- Chowgan Castle, Yazd Province, Iran
- Chowgan, Kermanshah, a village in Kermanshah Province, Iran
- Chowgan ground, a large ground in Jammu and Kashmir, India
- Chowgan, Khomeyn, a village in Markazi Province, Iran
- Chowgan, Komijan, a village in Markazi Province, Iran
- Chugan, South Khorasan, a village in South Khorasan Province, Iran

== See also ==
- Chaugan, term for plains in Himachal Pradesh, India
- Chaugan Stadium, Jaipur, Rajasthan, India
- Cogan, a surname
- Chuganha, another term for the Madhyamaka philosophy of Buddhism
- Jogan (disambiguation)
- Shagan (disambiguation)
