= Chagan =

Chagan may refer to:

== Places ==
- Chagan (closed city), an abandoned closed city in Kazakhstan, currently a ghost town
- Chagan, Da'an, Jilin (叉干镇), a town in Da'an, Jilin, China
- Chagan (差干镇), a town in Pingyuan County, Guangdong, China
- Birinci Çağan, a village in Shamakhi Rayon, Azerbaijan
- Chekan, also known as Chagān, a village in East Azerbaijan Province, Iran
- İkinci Çağan, a village in Shamakhi Rayon, Azerbaijan

== Other ==
- Chagan (nuclear test)
- Russian name of the Shagan (Irtysh), a river in the Abai Region, Kazakhstan
- Chagan (lake, Kulunda Steppe), a lake in the Kazakhstan-Russia border
- Chagan (lake, Abai Region), a lake formed following the 1965 Soviet Chagan nuclear test
- Chagan Lake (China), a lake in Jilin, China
- Chagan (air base), in Kazakhstan, also called Dolon

== See also ==
- Shagan (disambiguation)
