= Chhatrari =

Place in Bharmour, Himachal Pradesh, India

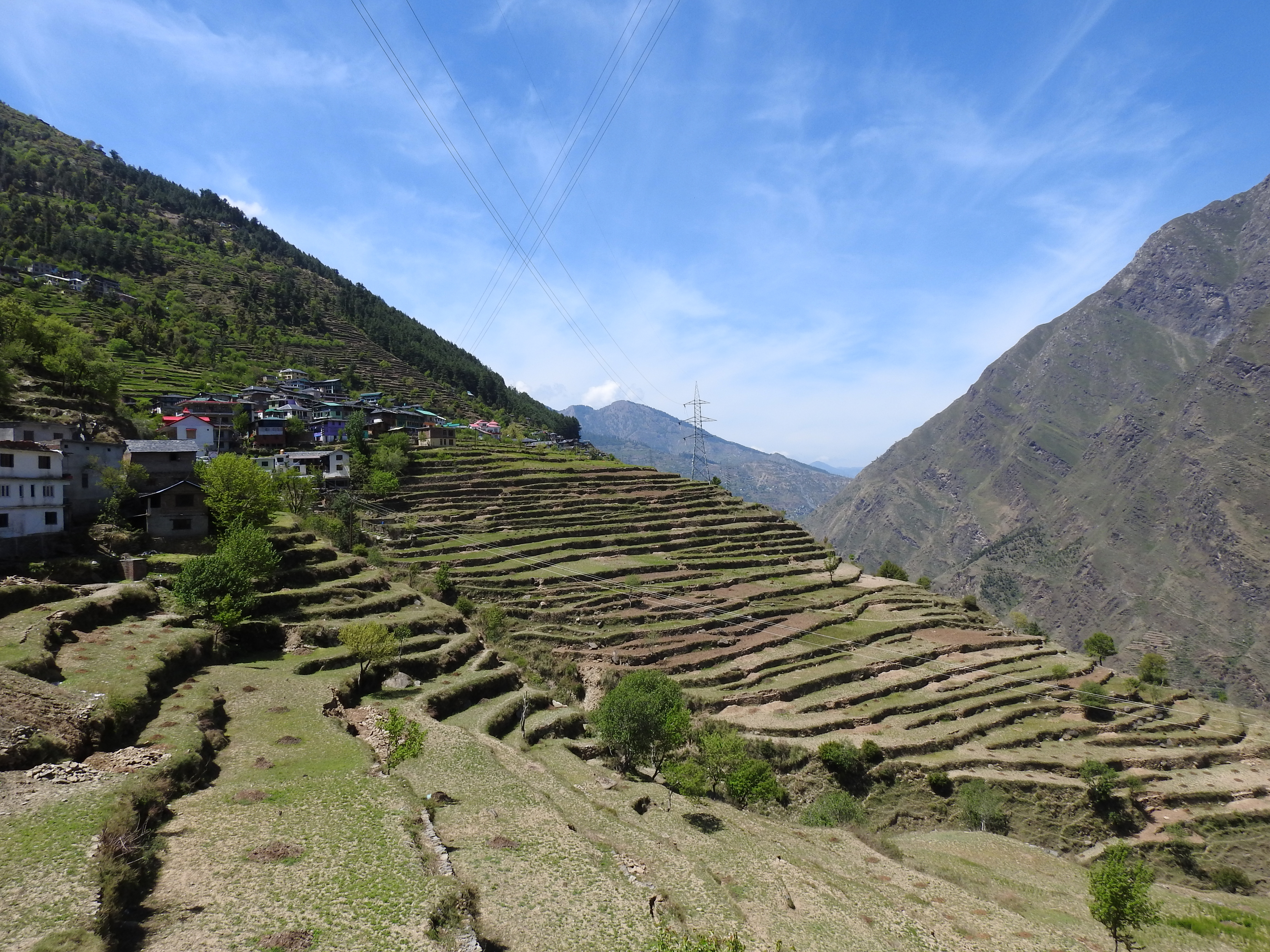
- Chhatrari village
- Interactive map of Chhatrari
- Country: India
- State: Himachal Pradesh

Languages
  - Official: Hindi
- Time zone: UTC+5:30 (IST)
- Coastline: 0 kilometres (0 mi)

Chhatrari is a village in Himachal Pradesh, India. It is located 48 km from Chamba.

It is known for its Chhatrari Devi temple, which was built by King Meru Verman of Bharmour, in Chamba, Himachal Pradesh, at an altitude of 6000 feet above sea level (32° 28′ N and Long. 76° 10′ E). The main idol of this ancient 8th-century temple is of Shakti, made of Ashtadhatu by a craftsman Gugga, 4 feet 6 inches tall which shows Shakti holding in her hands a lance (power, energy), a lotus (life), a bell (aether, space) and a snake (death and time). There is also an inscription with details of the temple, the king and his ancestors, the craftsman, and the locales of the village.

Every year on the third day of the Manimahesh Yatra, devotees bring water from Manimahesh Lake and the idol of Shakti is bathed in it, with pious rituals. Its history is closely woven with that of Bharmour, due to the Dharmeshvar Mahadev (Dharamraj) Temple in the northern corner of Chaurasi Temple Bharmour, also built by Raja Meru Verman.

The village has 36 water sources with panihars or fountain slabs, and surrounded by Cedrus deodara forests, as also housing an Industrial training Institute.

== Gallery ==
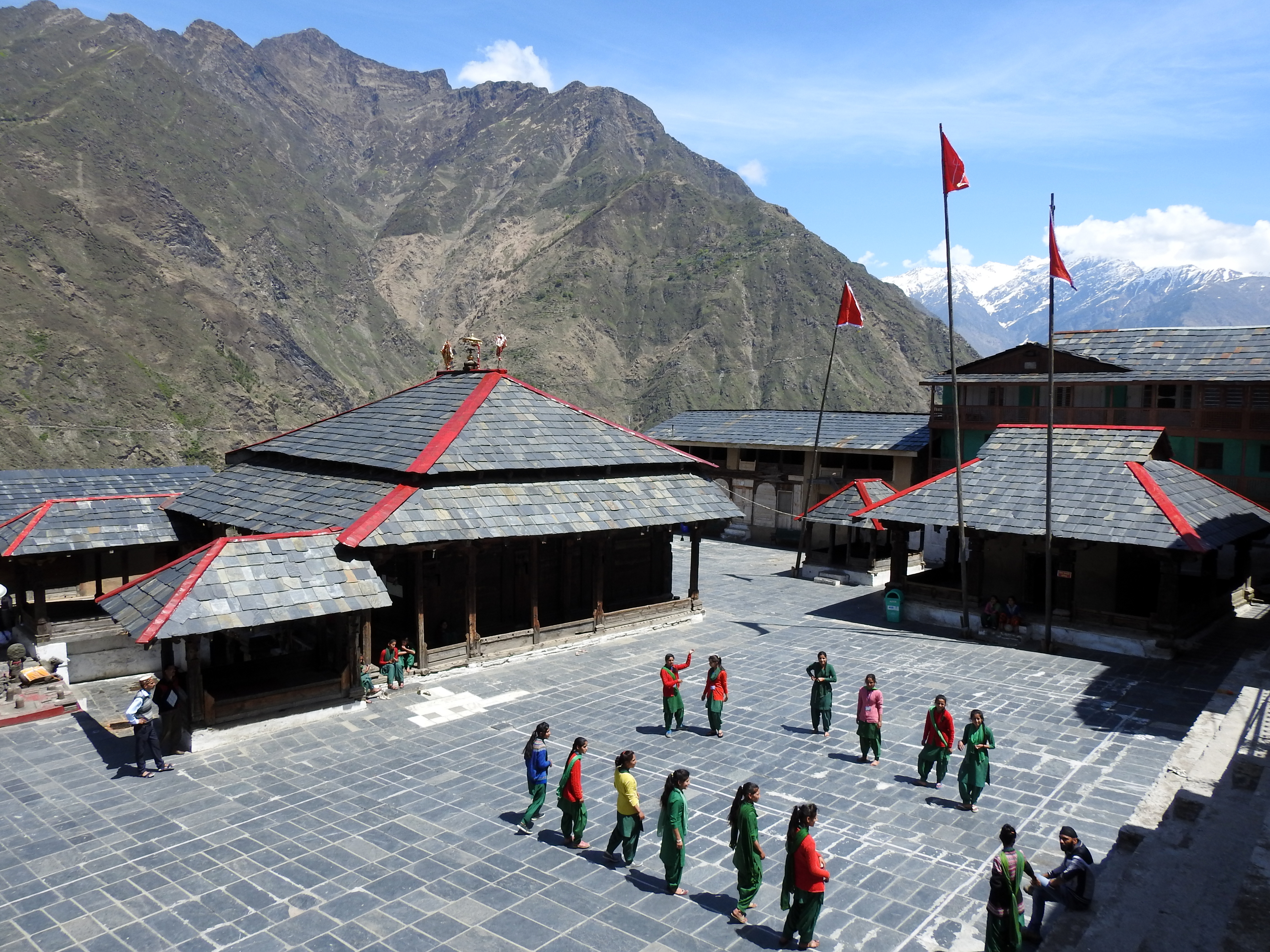
Shri Shakti Devi temple Chhatrari, Chamba

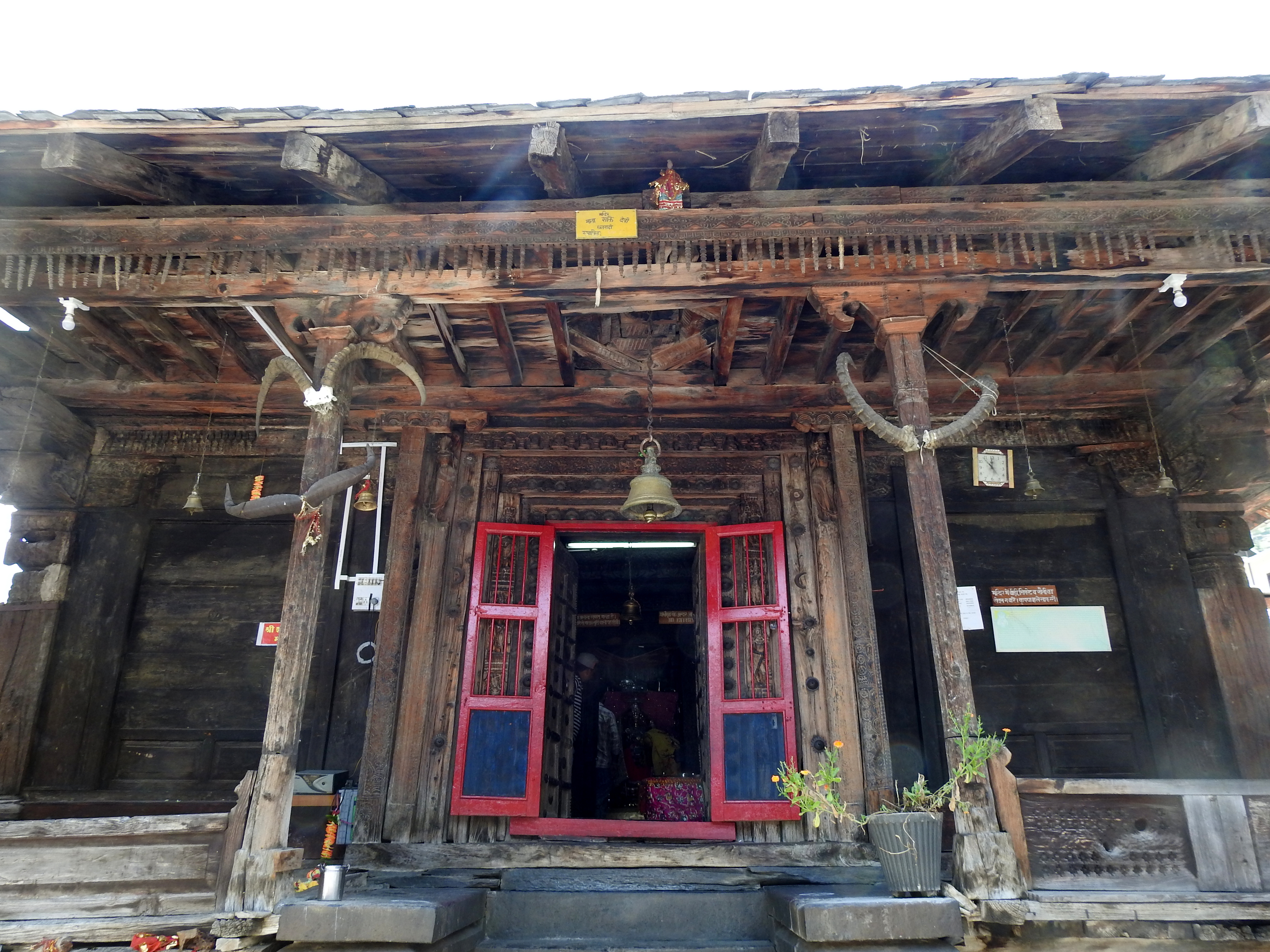
Entrance of Shri Shakti Devi temple Chhatrari, Chamba

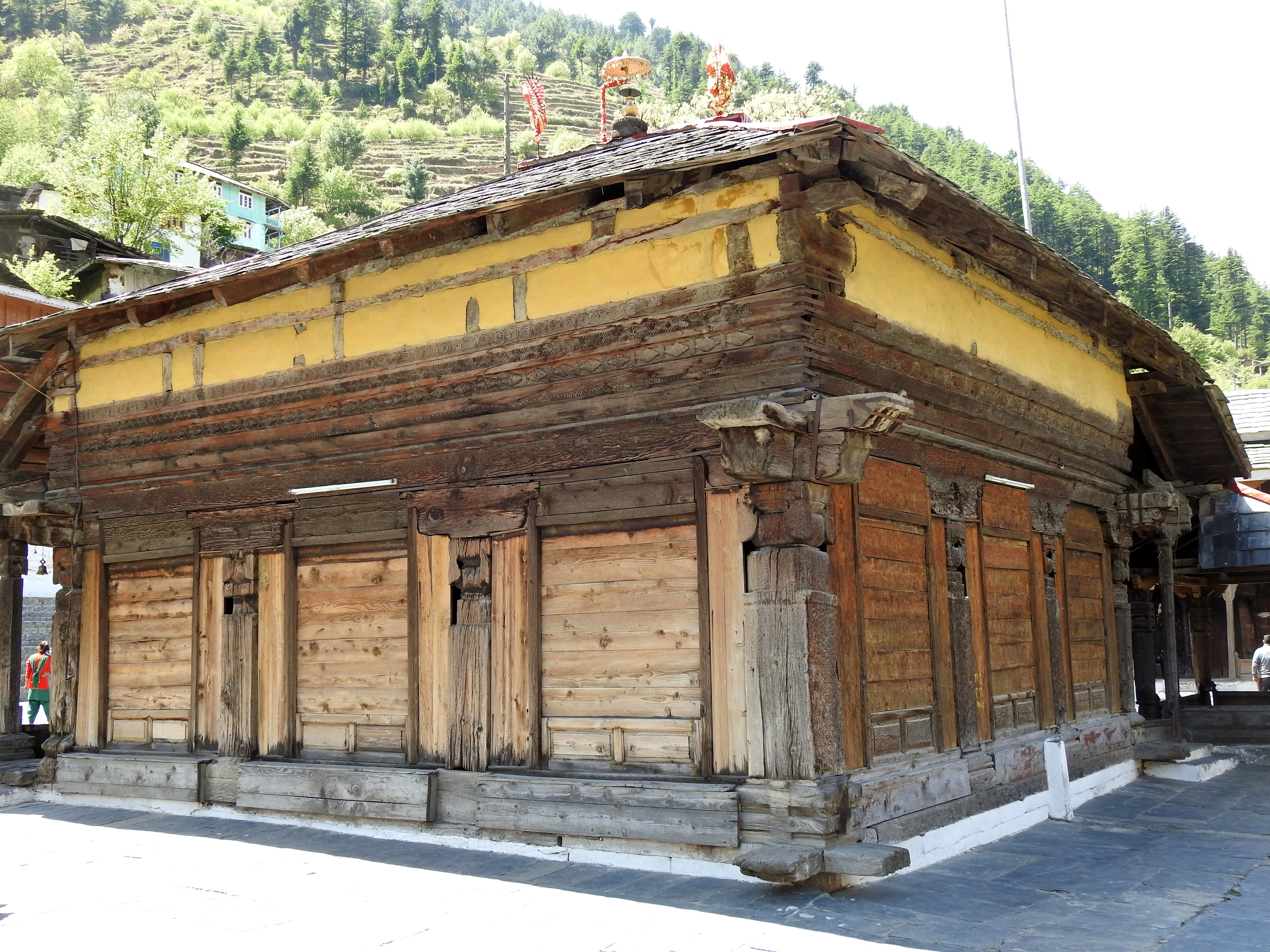
Outer view of Shri Shakti Devi temple Chhatrari, Chamba

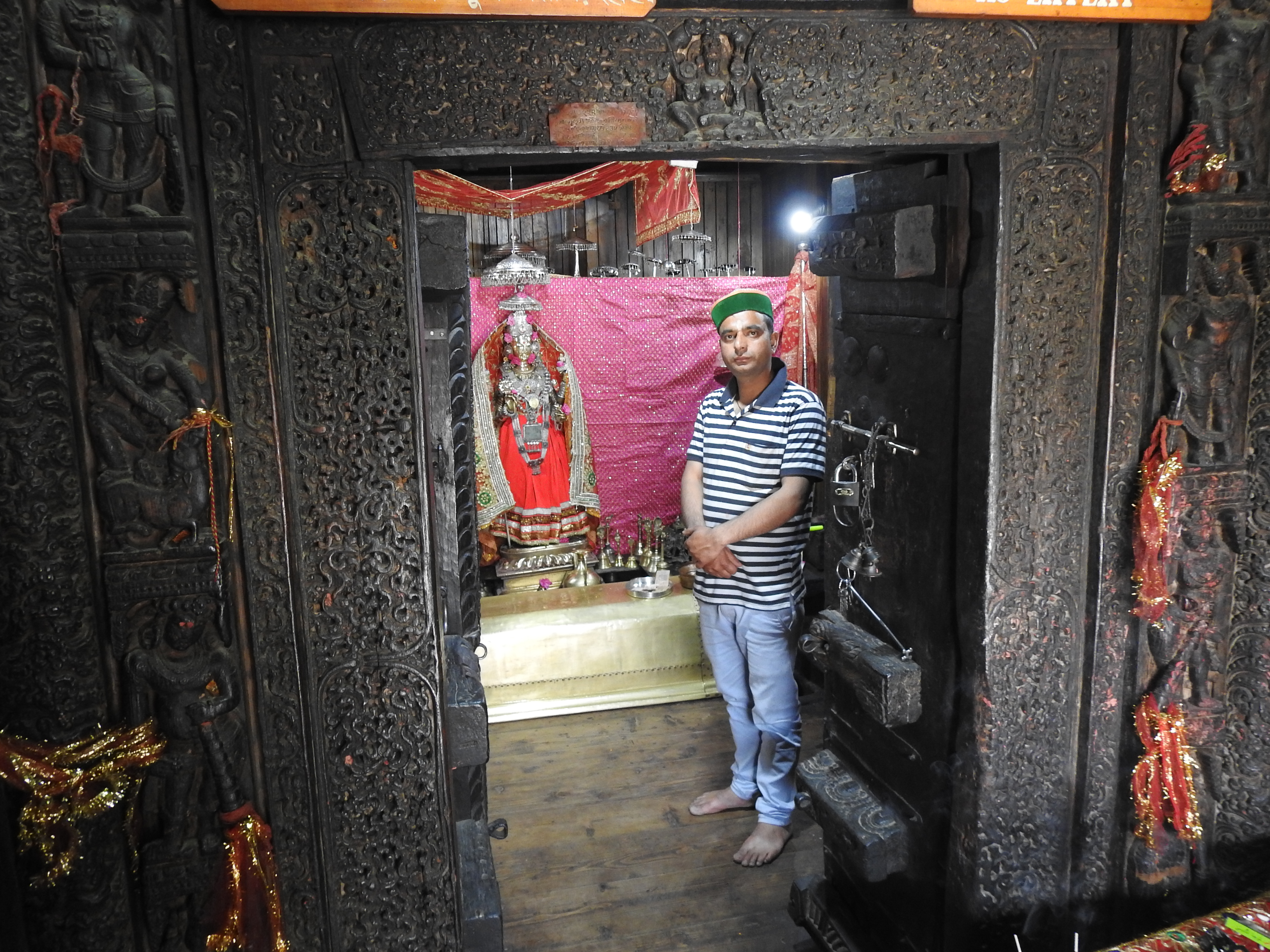
Idol of (and priest) Shri Shakti Devi temple Chhatrari, Chamba

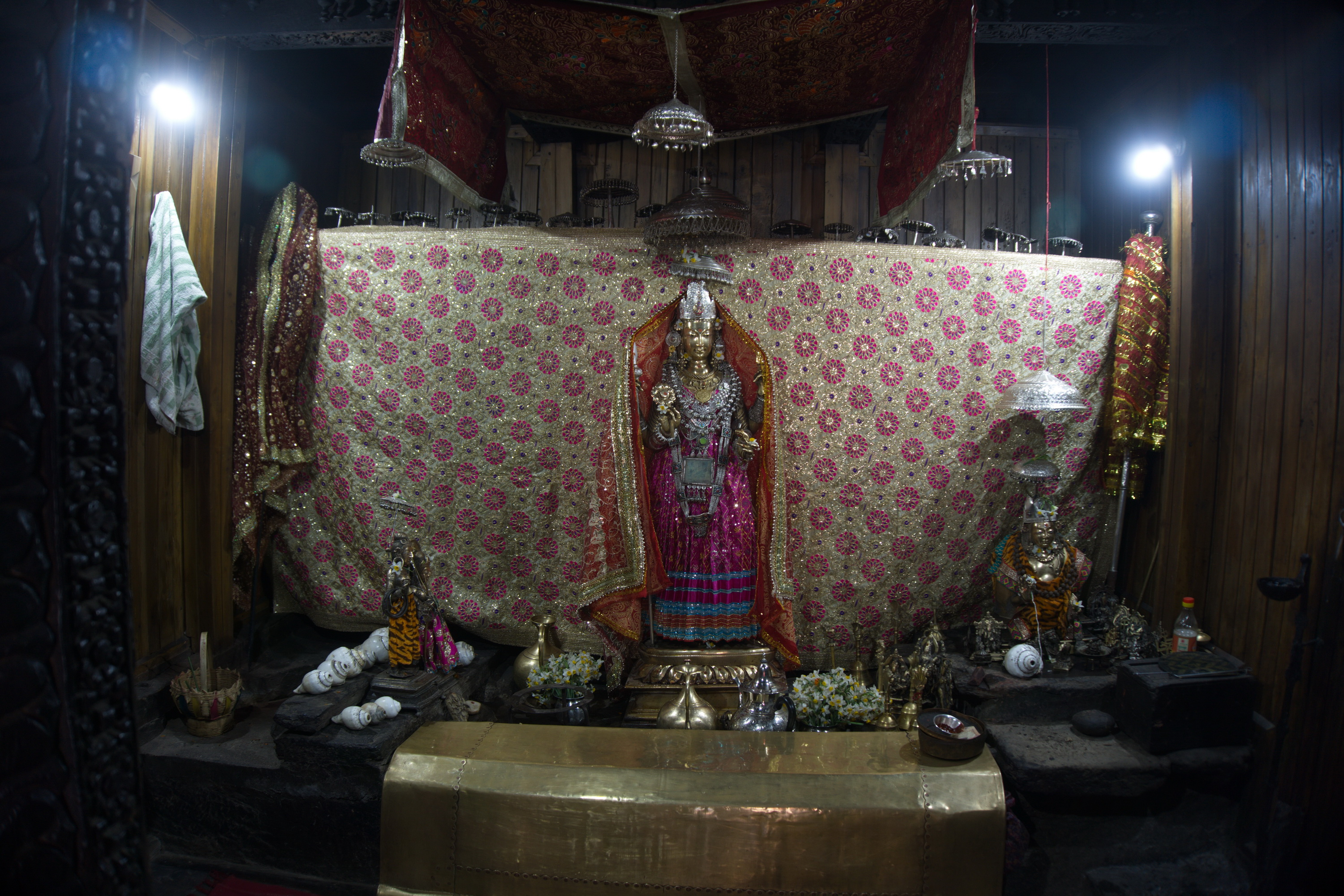
Ashtadhatu Shakti of 8th century, in Shri Shakti Devi temple, built by Raja Meru Verman of Bharmour, in Chhatrari, Chamba, Himachal Pradesh

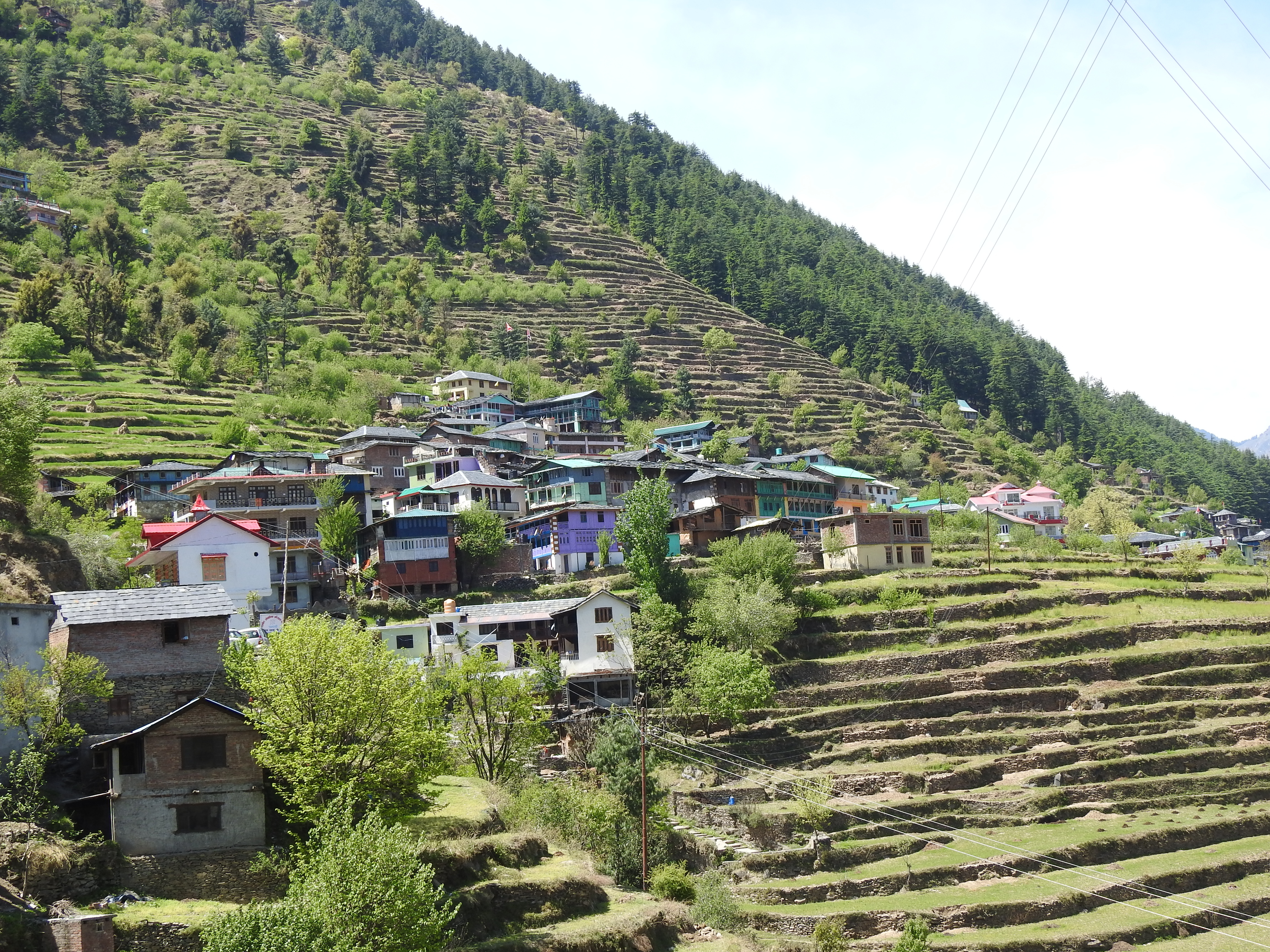
Chhatrari village and landscape, Chamba

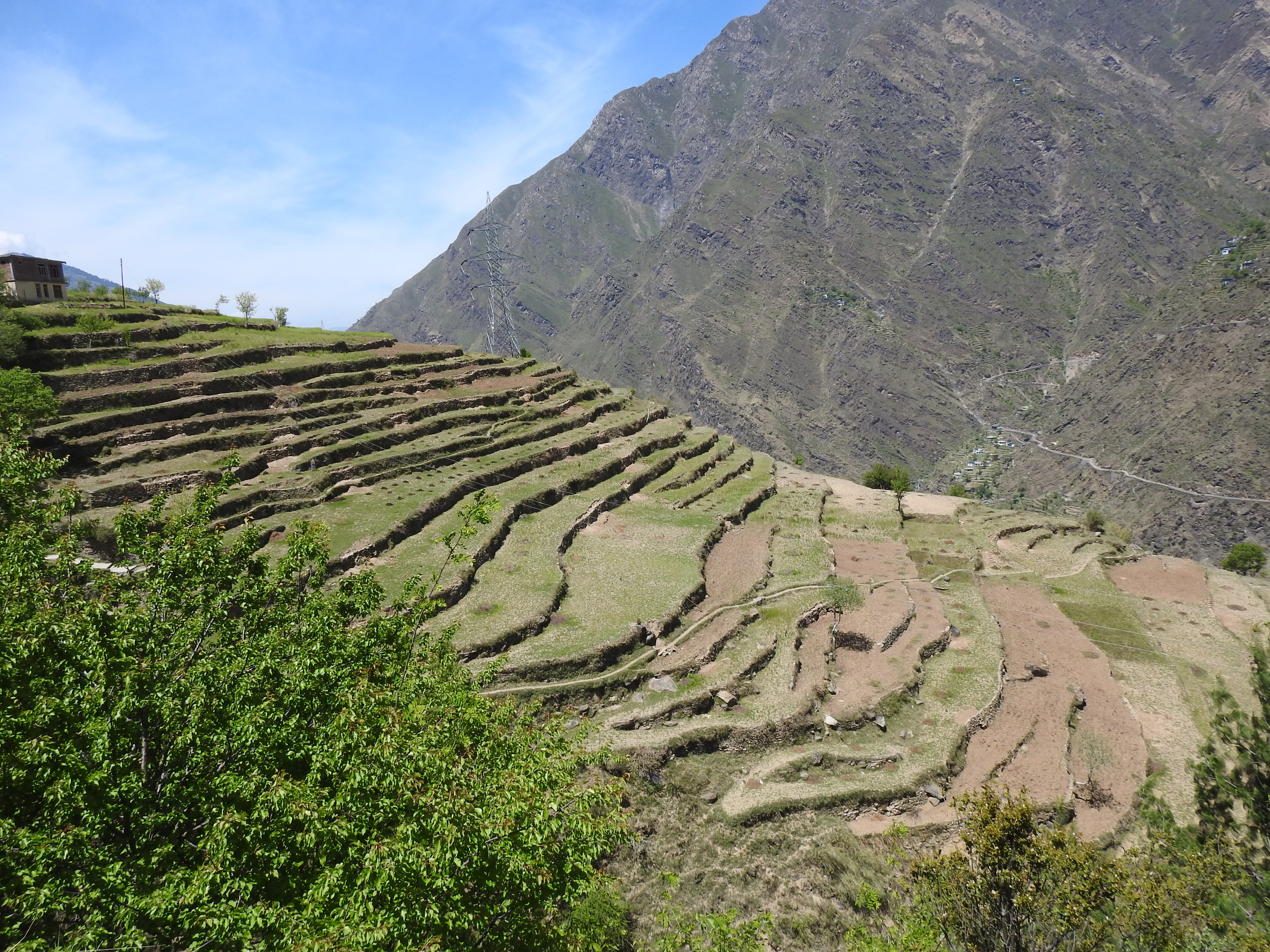
Chhatrari village and its landscape, Chamba

== See also ==
- Bharmour
- Manimahesh Lake
- Chaurasi Temple Bharmour
