= Mahasiddha =

Master practitioner of yoga and tantra

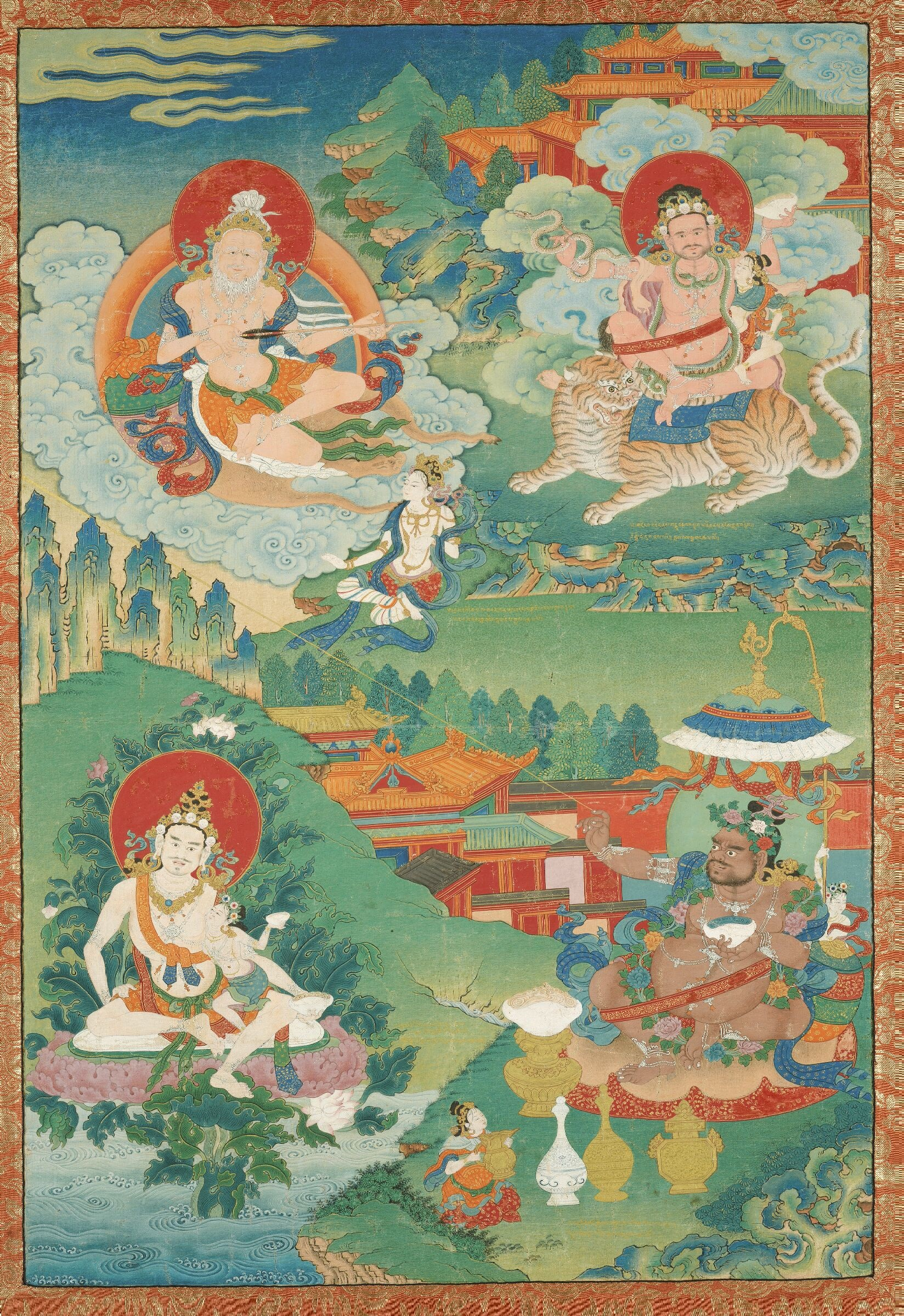
Four Mahasiddhas (18th century, Boston MFA). Saraha in top left, Dombhi Heruka top right, Naropa bottom left, and Virupa bottom right.

Mahasiddha (Sanskrit: mahāsiddha "great adept; Tibetan: གྲུབ་ཐོབ་ཆེན་པོ, Wylie: grub thob chen po, THL: druptop chenpo) is a term for someone who embodies and cultivates the "siddhi of perfection". A siddha is an individual who, through the practice of sādhanā, attains the realization of siddhis, psychic and spiritual abilities and powers.

Mahasiddhas were practitioners of yoga and tantra, or tantrikas. Their historical influence throughout the Indian subcontinent and the Himalayas was vast and they reached mythic proportions as codified in their songs of realization and hagiographies, or namtars, many of which have been preserved in the Tibetan Buddhist canon. The Mahasiddhas are identified as founders of Vajrayana traditions and lineages such as Dzogchen and Mahamudra, as well as among Bön, Nāth, and Tamil siddhars, with the same Mahasiddha sometimes serving simultaneously as a founding figure for different traditions.

Robert Thurman explains the symbiotic relationship between Tantric Buddhist communities and the Buddhist universities such as Nalanda which flourished at the same time. (Note: Gray (2007), pp. ix–x: "The Tantric communities of India in the latter half of the first Common Era millennium (and perhaps even earlier) were something like 'Institutes of Advanced Studies' in relation to the great Buddhist monastic 'Universities'. They were research centers for highly cultivated, successfully graduated experts in various branches of Inner Science (adhyatmavidya), some of whom were still monastics and could move back and forth from university (vidyalaya) to 'site' (patha), and many of whom had resigned vows of poverty, celibacy, and so forth, and were living in the classical Indian sannyāsin or sādhu style. I call them the 'psychonauts' of the tradition, in parallel with our 'astronauts', the materialist scientist-adventurers whom we admire for their courageous explorations of the 'outer space' which we consider the matrix of material reality. Inverse astronauts, the psychonauts voyaged deep into 'inner space', encountering and conquering angels and demons in the depths of their subconscious minds.")

== Genealogy and historical dates ==
The exact genealogy and historical dates of the Mahasiddhas are contentious. As Jackson notes, "despite their importance and influence, the siddhas ... remain profoundly elusive, especially to the historian. We don’t know exactly who they were, what religious allegiance they claimed, where or when—or even if—they lived, or how many of the works attributed to them really are theirs". Comparing Abhayadattaśrī's and Ratnākaragupta's Vajrāsana lists of the 84 siddhas, Lopez found that only 34 names are held in common. Dowman (1986) holds that they all lived between 750 and 1150 CE.

== Primary tradition ==
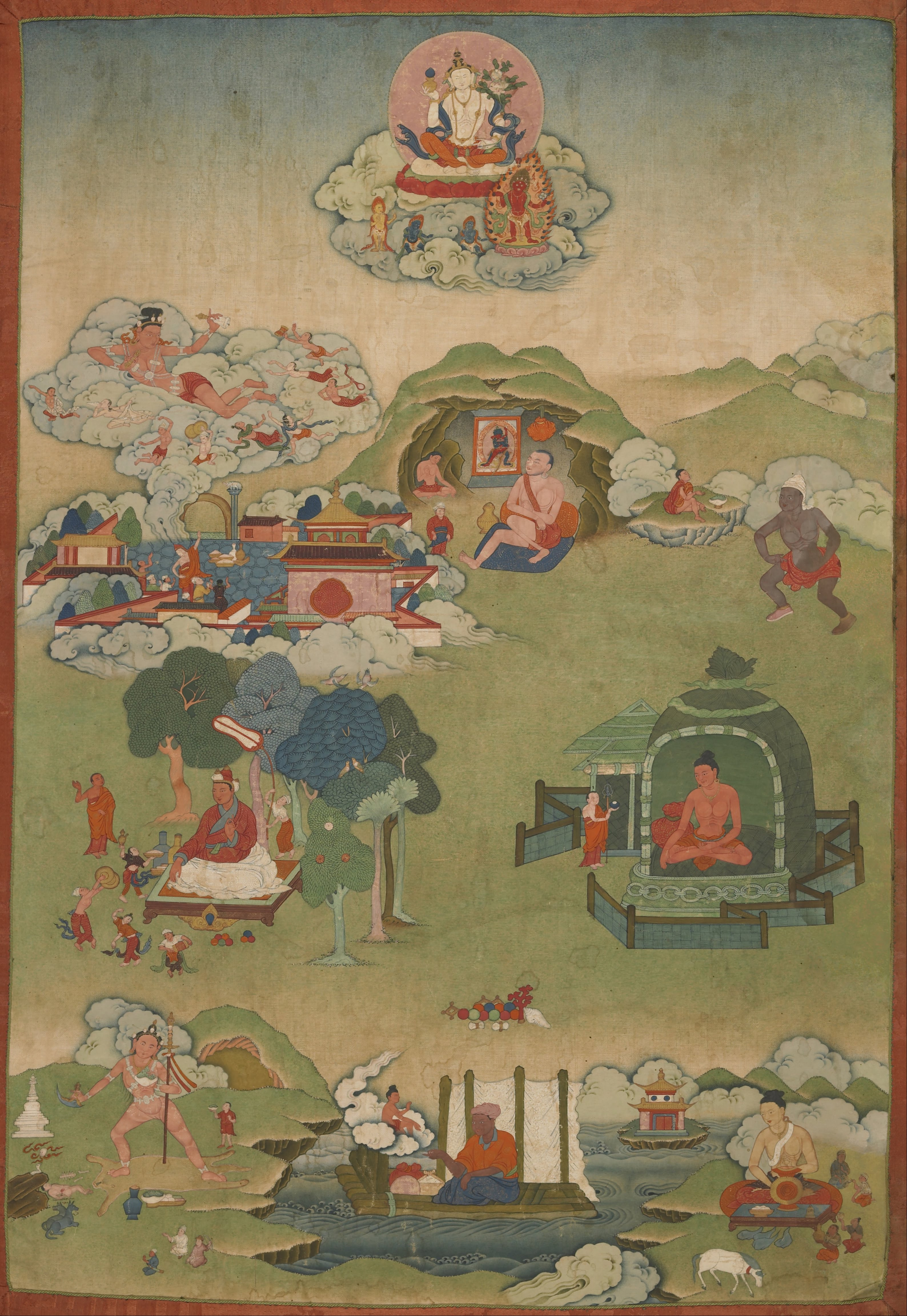
Eight Mahasiddhas with the bodhisattva Samantabhadra (top); 1st row (l->r): Darikapa, Putalipa, Upanaha; 2nd row: Kokilipa and Anangapa; 3rd row: Lakshmikara; Samudra; Vyalipa.

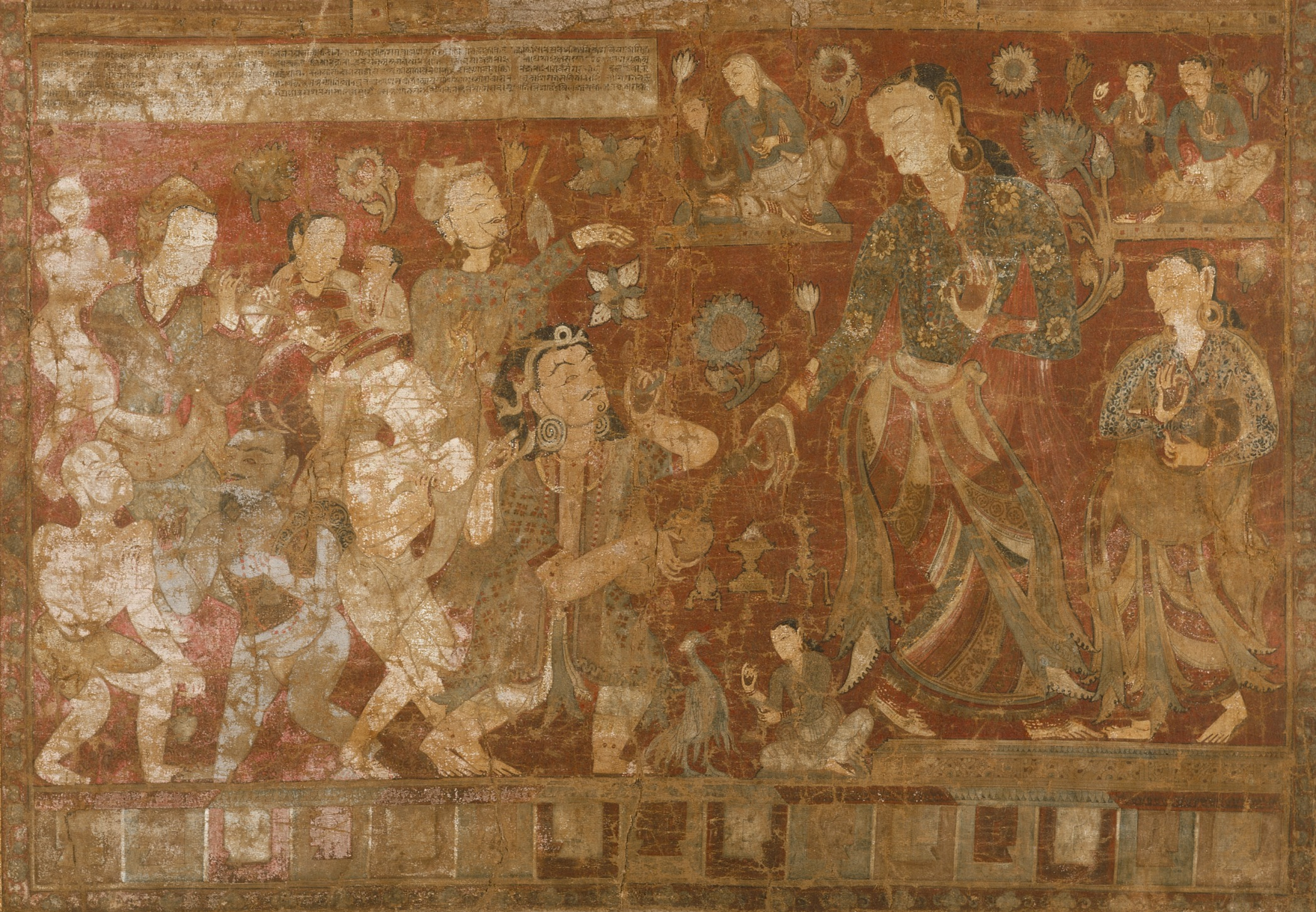
The Mahasiddha Vanaratna (1384-1468) receiving Abhishekha (Initiation) from Sita Tara (White Tara)

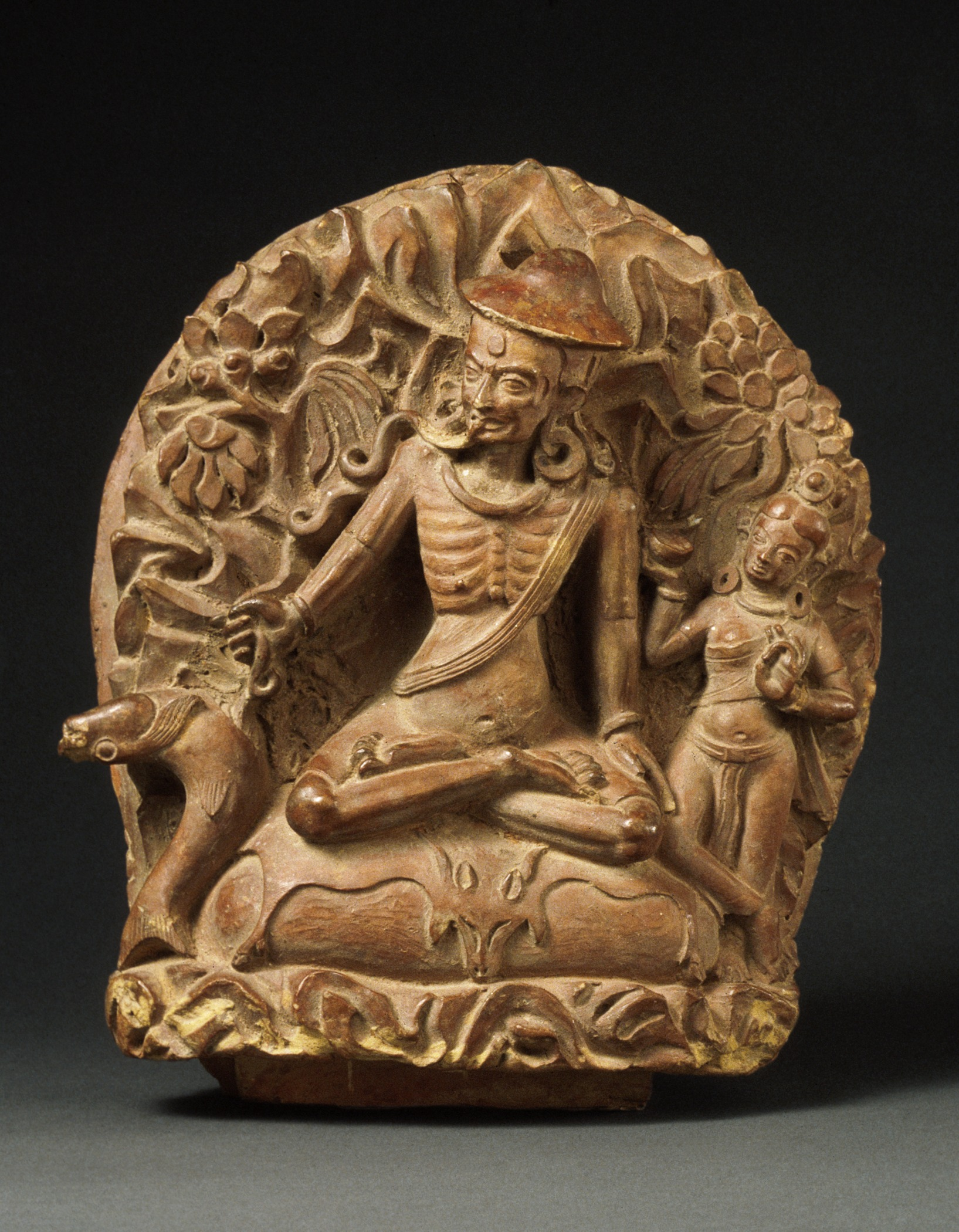
Terracotta sculpture of Luyipa, Nepal, Patan or Thimi, early 17th century

Abhayadatta Sri is an Indian scholar of the 12th century who is claimed to have recorded the hagiographies of the eighty-four siddhas in a text known as The History of the Eighty-four Mahasiddhas (Sanskrit: Caturasitisiddha pravrtti; Wylie: grub thob brgyad bcu tsa bzhi'i lo rgyus).

Dowman holds that the eighty-four Mahasiddha are spiritual archetypes:

The number eighty-four is a "whole" or "perfect" number. Thus the eighty-four siddhas can be seen as archetypes representing the thousands of exemplars and adepts of the tantric way. The siddhas were remarkable for the diversity of their family backgrounds and the dissimilarity of their social roles. They were found in every reach of the social structure: kings and ministers, priests and yogins, poets and musicians, craftsmen and farmers, housewives and whores.

Reynolds (2007) states that the mahasiddha tradition "evolved in North India in the early Medieval Period (3–13 cen. CE). Philosophically this movement was based on the insights revealed in the Mahayana Sutras and as systematized in the Madhyamaka and Chittamatrin schools of philosophy, but the methods of meditation and practice were radically different than anything seen in the monasteries. He proffers that the mahasiddha tradition "broke with the conventions of Buddhist monastic life of the time, and abandoning the monastery they practiced in the caves, the forests, and the country villages of Northern India. In complete contrast to the settled monastic establishment of their day, which concentrated the Buddhist intelligenzia [sic.] in a limited number of large monastic universities, they adopted the life-style of itinerant mendicants, much as the wandering Sadhus of modern India."

The charnel ground conveys how great mahasiddhas in the Nath and Vajrayana traditions such as Tilopa (988–1069) and Gorakshanath (fl. 11th – 12th century) yoked adversity to till the soil of the path and accomplish the fruit:

The charnel ground is not merely the hermitage; it can also be discovered or revealed in completely terrifying mundane environments where practitioners find themselves desperate and depressed, where conventional worldly aspirations have become devastated by grim reality. This is demonstrated in the sacred biographies of the great siddhas of the Vajrayāna tradition. Tilopa attained realization as a grinder of sesame seeds and a procurer for a prominent prostitute. Sarvabhakṣa was an extremely obese glutton, Gorakṣa was a cowherd in remote climes, Taṅtepa was addicted to gambling, and Kumbharipa was a destitute potter. These circumstances were charnel grounds because they were despised in Indian society and the siddhas were viewed as failures, marginal and defiled.

In his study of the Hevajra Tantra, David Snellgrove outlines the typical tantric siddha or yogi. After experiencing the consummation of enlightenment in the embrace of a female consort:

Thereafter the pupil is free to pursue the practice of strenuous meditation and physical self-control, and after five years or more he will perhaps succeed. He receives the five symbolic adornments, crown, ear-rings, necklace, bracelets, girdle, signs of his success. These he wears on those set occasions, the eighth or fifteenth day of the dark-fortnight, when perfected yogins and yoginis come together, to consume the flesh and wine, to sing and dance, and realize their consummation of bliss. He is free from all conventions and wanders as he pleases, knowing no distinction between friend or foe, clean or unclean, good or evil.

== Other traditions ==
According to Ulrich von Schroeder, Tibet has different traditions relating to the mahasiddhas. Among these traditions, two were particularly popular, namely the Abhayadatta Sri list and the so-called Vajrasana list. The number of mahasiddhas varies between eighty-four and eighty-eight, and only about thirty-six of the names occur in both lists. In many instances more than one siddha with the same name exists, so it must be assumed that fewer than thirty siddhas of the two traditions actually relate to the same historical persons. In the days when the siddhas of the later Tibetan traditions flourished in India (i.e., between the 9th and 11th centuries), it was not uncommon for initiates to assume the names of famous adepts of the past. Sometimes a disciple would have the same name as his guru, while still other names were based on caste or tribe. In such a context the distinction between siddhas of the same name becomes blurred. The entire process of distinguishing between siddhas with the same name of different texts and lineages is therefore to large extent guesswork. The great variation in phonetic transcription of Indian words into Tibetan may partly be the result of various Tibetan dialects. In the process of copying the Tibetan transcriptions in later times, the spelling often became corrupted to such an extent that the recognition or reconstitution of the original names became all but impossible. Whatever the reasons might be, the Tibetan transcription of Indian names of mahasiddhas clearly becomes more and more corrupt as time passes.

== Geographical sites ==
Local folk tradition refers to a number of icons and sacred sites to the eighty-four Mahasiddha at Bharmour (formerly known as Brahmapura) in the Chaurasi complex. The word chaurasi means "eighty-four".

It is also very significant that nowhere else, except at Bharmaur in Chamba district, may be seen the living tradition of the Eighty-four Siddhas. In the Chaurasi temple complex, near which the famous temple of goddess Lakshana (8th century A.D.) stands, there once were eighty-four small shrines, each dedicated to a Siddha.

A number of archaeological sacred sites require iconographic analysis in the Chaurasi complex in Chamba, Himachal Pradesh. Although it might be hagiographical accretion and folk lore, it is said that in the reign of Sahil Varman, Brahmapura was visited by 84 yogis who were greatly pleased with the monarch's piety and hospitality, thusly they promised him an heir and in due course ten sons were born and also a daughter named Champavati.

== Caturāsiti-siddha-pravrtti ==
The Caturasiti-siddha-pravrtti (CSP), “The Lives of the Eighty-four Siddhas”, compiled by Abhayadatta Sri, a Northern Indian Sanskrit text dating from the 11th or 12th century, comes from a tradition prevalent in the ancient city-state of Campa in the modern state of Bihar. Only Tibetan translations of this Sanskrit text seem to have survived. This text was translated into Tibetan by sMon grub Shes rab and is known as the Grub thob brgyad cu rtsa bzhi’i lo rgyus or “The Legends of the Eighty-four Siddhas”. It has been suggested that Abhayadatta Sri is identical with the great Indian scholar Mahapandita Abhayakaragupta (late 11th–early 12th century), the compiler of the iconographic compendiums Vajravali, Nispannayogavali, and Jyotirmanjari.

The other major Tibetan tradition is based on the list contained in the Caturasiti-siddhabhyarthana (CSA) by Ratnakaragupta of Vajrasana, identical with Bodhgaya (Tib.: rDo rje gdan) located in Bihar, Northern India. The Tibetan translation is known as Grub thob brgyad cu rtsa bzhi’i gsol ’debs by rDo rje gdan pa. There exist several Tibetan versions of the list of mahasiddhas based on the Vajrasana text. However, these Tibetan texts differ in many cases with regard to the Tibetan transcriptions of the Indian mahasiddhas names.

== Eighty-Four Mahasiddhas ==
By convention there are eighty-four Mahasiddhas in both Hindu and Tibetan Buddhist traditions, with some overlap between the two lists. The number is congruent with the number of siddhi or occult powers held in the Indian Religions. In Tibetan Buddhist art they are often depicted together as a matched set in works such as thangka paintings where they may be used collectively as border decorations around a central figure.

Each Mahasiddha has come to be known for certain characteristics and teachings, which facilitates their pedagogical use. One of the most beloved Mahasiddhas is Virūpa, who may be taken as the patron saint of the Sakyapa sect and instituted the Lamdré (Tibetan: lam 'bras) teachings. Virupa (alternate orthographies: Birwapa/Birupa) lived in 9th century India and was known for his great attainments.

Some of the methods and practices of the Mahasiddha were codified in Buddhist scriptures known as Tantras. Traditionally the ultimate source of these methods and practices is held to be the historical Buddha Shakyamuni, but often it is a transhistorical aspect of the Buddha or deity Vajradhara who reveals the Tantra in question directly to the Mahasiddha in a vision or whilst they dream or are in a trance. This form of the deity is known as a sambhogakaya manifestation.

Four of the eighty-four Mahasiddhas are women. They are:

- Manibhadra, the Perfect Wife
- Lakshmincara, The Princess of Crazy wisdom
- Mekhala, the elder of the 2 Headless Sisters
- Kanakhala, the younger of the 2 Headless Sisters

== List of the Mahasiddhas ==
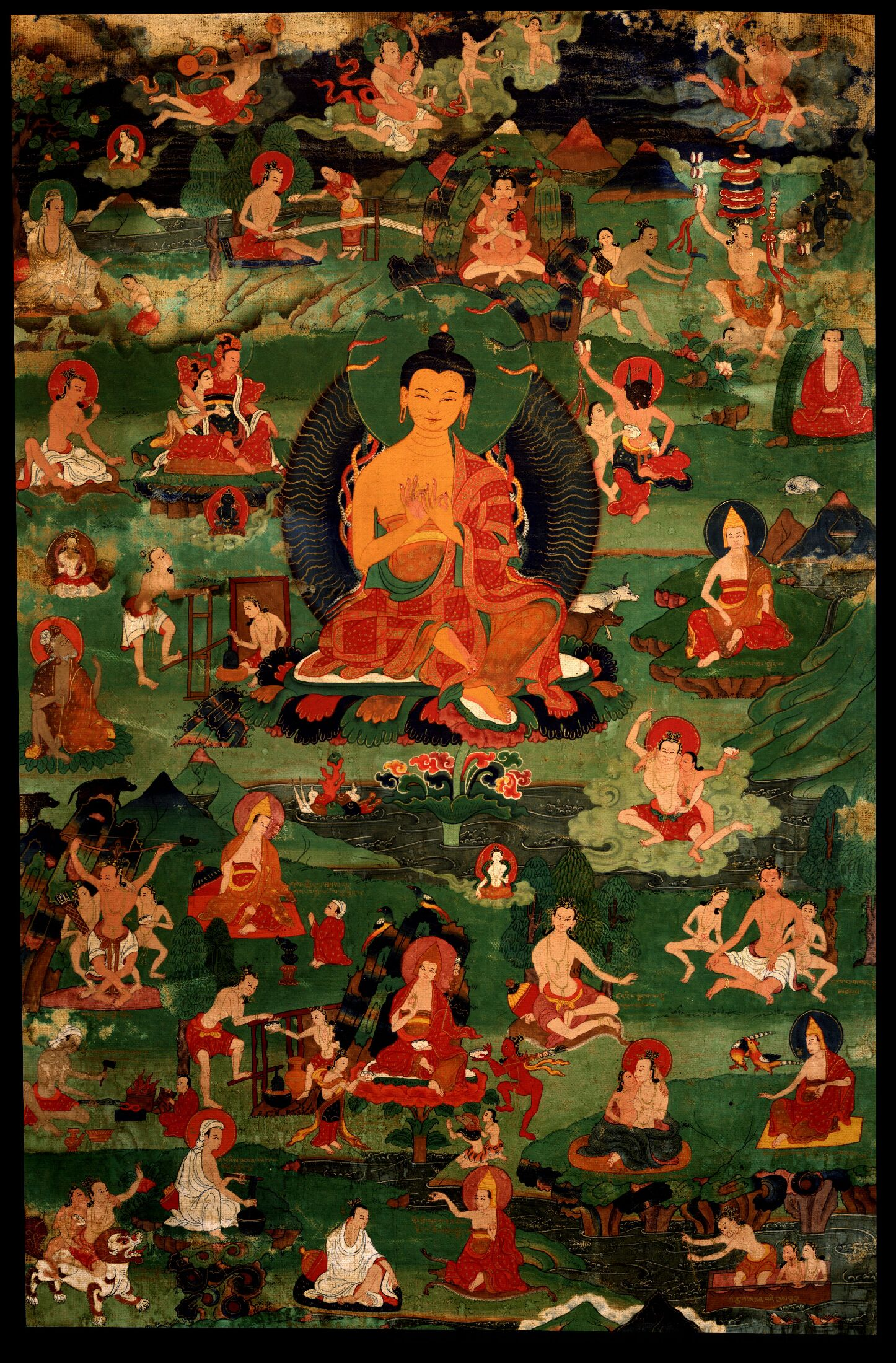
Nāgārjuna with 34 Mahāsiddhas (c. 1750), Tibetan Buddhist thangka currently preserved in the Rubin Museum of Art, New York City

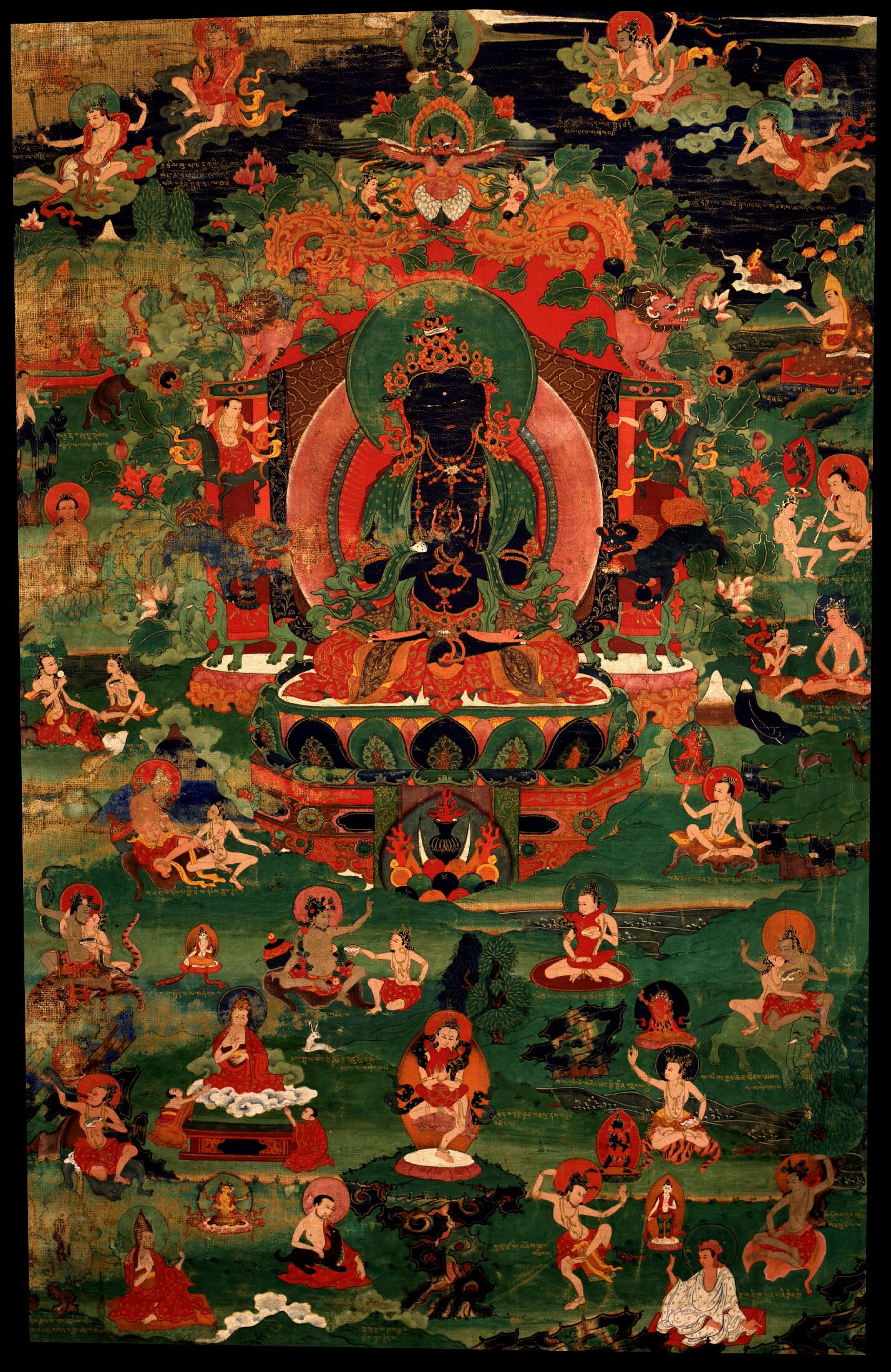
Vajradhara and 25 Mahāsiddhas

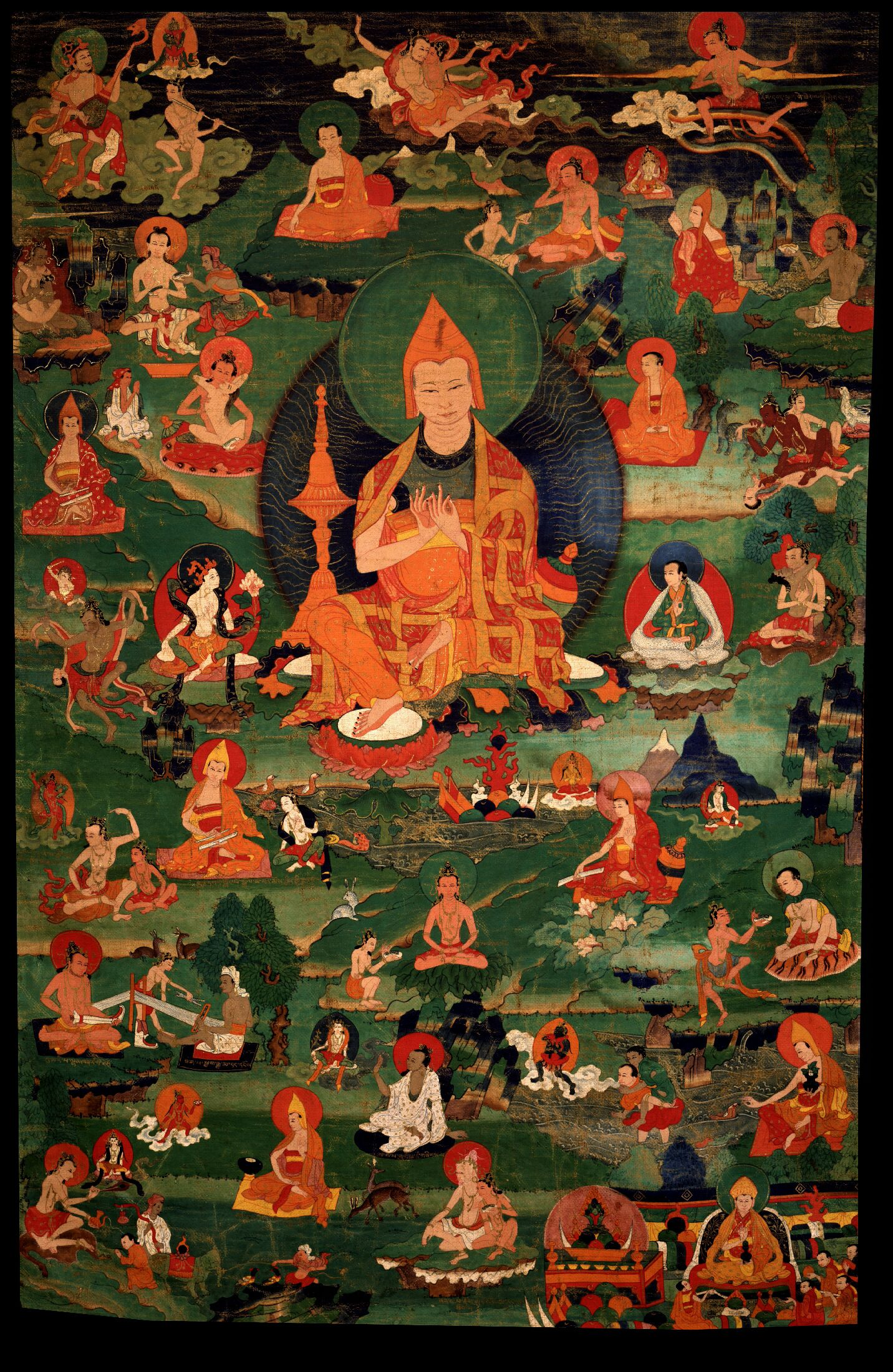
Atiśa and 28 Mahāsiddhas

In Vajrayana Buddhism there are eighty-four Mahasiddhas. The list (in alphabetical order) below includes their name and their epithet. An asterisk after their name denotes a female Mahasiddha.

Many Mahasiddhas practiced specific tantras, for example Brahman Kukkuripa (34th in Abhyadatta's list) of Kapilaśakru practiced Cakrasaṃvara Tantra, Monk Virūpa (3) of Somapuri practiced Hevajra for 12 years, Monk Karṇaripa (Aryadeva) (18) of Nālandā practiced Guhyasamāja.

1. Acinta, the "Avaricious Hermit";
2. Ajogi, the "Rejected Wastrel";
3. Anangapa, the "Handsome Fool";
4. Aryadeva (Karnaripa), the "One-Eyed",(fl. 3rd century CE), Nalanda;
5. Babhaha, the "Free Lover";
6. Bhadrapa, the "Exclusive Brahmin";
7. Bhandepa, the "Envious God";
8. Bhiksanapa, "Siddha Two-Teeth";
9. Bhusuku (Shantideva), the "Idle Monk";
10. Camaripa, the "Divine Cobbler";
11. Champaka, the "Flower King";
12. Carbaripa (Carpati) "the Petrifyer";
13. Catrapa, the "Lucky Beggar";
14. Caurangipa, "the Dismembered Stepson";
15. Celukapa, the "Revitalized Drone";
16. Darikapa, the "Slave-King of the Temple Whore";
17. Dengipa, the "Courtesan's Brahmin Slave";
18. Dhahulipa, the "Blistered Rope-Maker";
19. Dharmapa, the "Eternal Student" (c.900 CE);
20. Dhilipa, the "Epicurean Merchant";
21. Dhobipa, the "Wise Washerman";
22. Dhokaripa, the "Bowl-Bearer";
23. Dombi Heruka, the "Tiger Rider";
24. Dukhandi, the "Scavenger";
25. Ghantapa, the "Celibate Bell-Ringer";
26. Gharbari or Gharbaripa, the "Contrite Scholar" (Skt., pandita);
27. Godhuripa, the "Bird Catcher";
28. Goraksha, the "Immortal Cowherd";
29. Indrabhuti, the "Enlightened Siddha-King";
30. Jalandhara, the "Dakini's Chosen One";
31. Jayananda, the "Crow Master";
32. Jogipa, the "Siddha-Pilgrim";
33. Kalapa, the "Handsome Madman";
34. Kamparipa, the "Blacksmith";
35. Kambala (Lavapa), the "Black-Blanket-Clad Yogin";
36. Kanakhala*, the younger Severed-Headed Sister;
37. Kanhapa (Krishnacharya), the "Dark Siddha";
38. Kankana, the "Siddha-King";
39. Kankaripa, the "Lovelorn Widower";
40. Kantalipa, the "Ragman-Tailor";
41. Kapalapa, the "Skull Bearer";
42. Khadgapa, the "Fearless Thief";
43. Kilakilapa, the "Exiled Loud-Mouth";
44. Kirapalapa (Kilapa), the "Repentant Conqueror";
45. Kokilipa, the "Complacent Aesthete";
46. Kotalipa (or Tog tse pa, the "Peasant Guru";
47. Kucipa, the "Goitre-Necked Yogin";
48. Kukkuripa, (late 9th/10th Century), the "Dog Lover";
49. Kumbharipa, "the Potter";
50. Laksminkara*, "The Mad Princess";
51. Lilapa, the "Royal Hedonist";
52. Lucikapa, the "Escapist";
53. Luipada, the "Fish-Gut Eater";
54. Mahipa, the "Greatest";
55. Manibhadra*, the "Happy Housewife";
56. Medhini, the "Tired Farmer";
57. Mekhala*, the Elder Severed-Headed Sister;
58. Mekopa, the "Guru Dread-Stare";
59. Minapa, the "Fisherman";
60. Nagabodhi, the "Red-Horned Thief'";
61. Nagarjuna, "Philosopher and Alchemist", a Brahmin, (c. 150 – c. 250 CE);
62. Nalinapa, the "Self-Reliant Prince";
63. Nirgunapa, the "Enlightened Moron";
64. Naropa, the "Dauntless";
65. Pacaripa, the "Pastrycook";
66. Pankajapa, the "Lotus-Born Brahmin";
67. Putalipa, the "Mendicant Icon-Bearer";
68. Rahula, the "Rejuvenated Dotard";
69. Saraha, the "Great Brahmin", the teacher of Nagarjuna, eastern India;
70. Sakara or Saroruha;
71. Samudra, the "Pearl Diver";
72. Śāntipa (or Ratnākaraśānti), the "Complacent Missionary";
73. Sarvabhaksa, the "Glutton";
74. Savaripa, the "Hunter", held to have incarnated in Drukpa Künleg;
75. Syalipa, the "Jackal Yogin";
76. Tantepa, the "Gambler";
77. Tantipa, the "Senile Weaver";
78. Thaganapa, the "Compulsive Liar";
79. Tilopa, the "Great Renunciate"
80. Udhilipa, the "Bird-Man";
81. Upanaha, the "Bootmaker";
82. Vinapa, the "Musician";
83. Virupa, the "Dakini Master";
84. Vyalipa, the "Courtesan's Alchemist"

=== Names according to the Abhayadatta Sri tradition ===
According to Ulrich von Schroeder, Tibet has different traditions relating to the mahasiddhas. Among these traditions, two were particularly popular, namely the Abhayadatta Sri list and the so-called Vajrasana list. The number of mahasiddhas varies between eighty-four and eighty-eight, and only about thirty-six of the names occur in both lists. It is therefore also wrong to state that in Buddhism are 84 Mahasiddhas. The correct title should therefore be Names of the 84 Mahasiddhas according to the Abhayadatta Sri Tradition. It should also be clearly stated that only Tibetan translations of this Sanskrit text Caturasiti-siddha-pravrtti (CSP) or The Lives of the Eighty-four Siddhas seem to have survived. This means that many Sanskrit names of the Abhayadatta Sri tradition had to be reconstructed and perhaps not always correctly.

=== Identification ===
According to Ulrich von Schroeder for the identification of Mahasiddhas inscribed with Tibetan names it is necessary to reconstruct the Indian names. This is a very difficult task because the Tibetans are very inconsistent with the transcription or translation of Indian personal names and therefore many different spellings do exist. When comparing the different Tibetan texts on mahasiddhas, we can see that the transcription or translation of the names of the Indian masters into the Tibetan language was inconsistent and confused. The most unsettling example is an illustrated Tibetan block print from Mongolia about the mahasiddhas, where the spellings in the text vary greatly from the captions of the xylographs. To quote a few examples: Kankaripa [Skt.] is named Kam ka li/Kangga la pa; Goraksa [Skt.]: Go ra kha/Gau raksi; Tilopa [Skt.]: Ti la blo ba/Ti lla pa; Dukhandi [Skt.]: Dha khan dhi pa/Dwa kanti; Dhobipa [Skt.]: Tom bhi pa/Dhu pi ra; Dengipa (CSP 31): Deng gi pa / Tinggi pa; Dhokaripa [Skt.]: Dho ka ra / Dhe ki ri pa; Carbaripa (Carpati) [Skt.]: Tsa ba ri pa/Tsa rwa ti pa; Sakara [Skt.]: Phu rtsas ga’/Ka ra pa; Putalipa [Skt.]: Pu ta la/Bu ta li, etc. In the same illustrated Tibetan text we find another inconsistency: the alternate use of transcription and translation. Examples are Nagarjuna [Skt.]: Na ga’i dzu na/Klu sgrub; Aryadeva (Karnaripa) [Skt.]: Ka na ri pa/’Phags pa lha; and Ghantapa [Skt.]: Ghanda pa/rDo rje dril bu pa, to name a few.

=== Concordance lists ===
For the identification of individual mahasiddhas the concordance lists published by Ulrich von Schroeder are useful tools for every scholar. The purpose of the concordance lists published in the appendices of his book is primarily for the reconstitution of the Indian names, regardless of whether they actually represent the same historical person or not. The index of his book contains more than 1000 different Tibetan spellings of mahasiddha names.

== Tibetan mahasiddhas ==
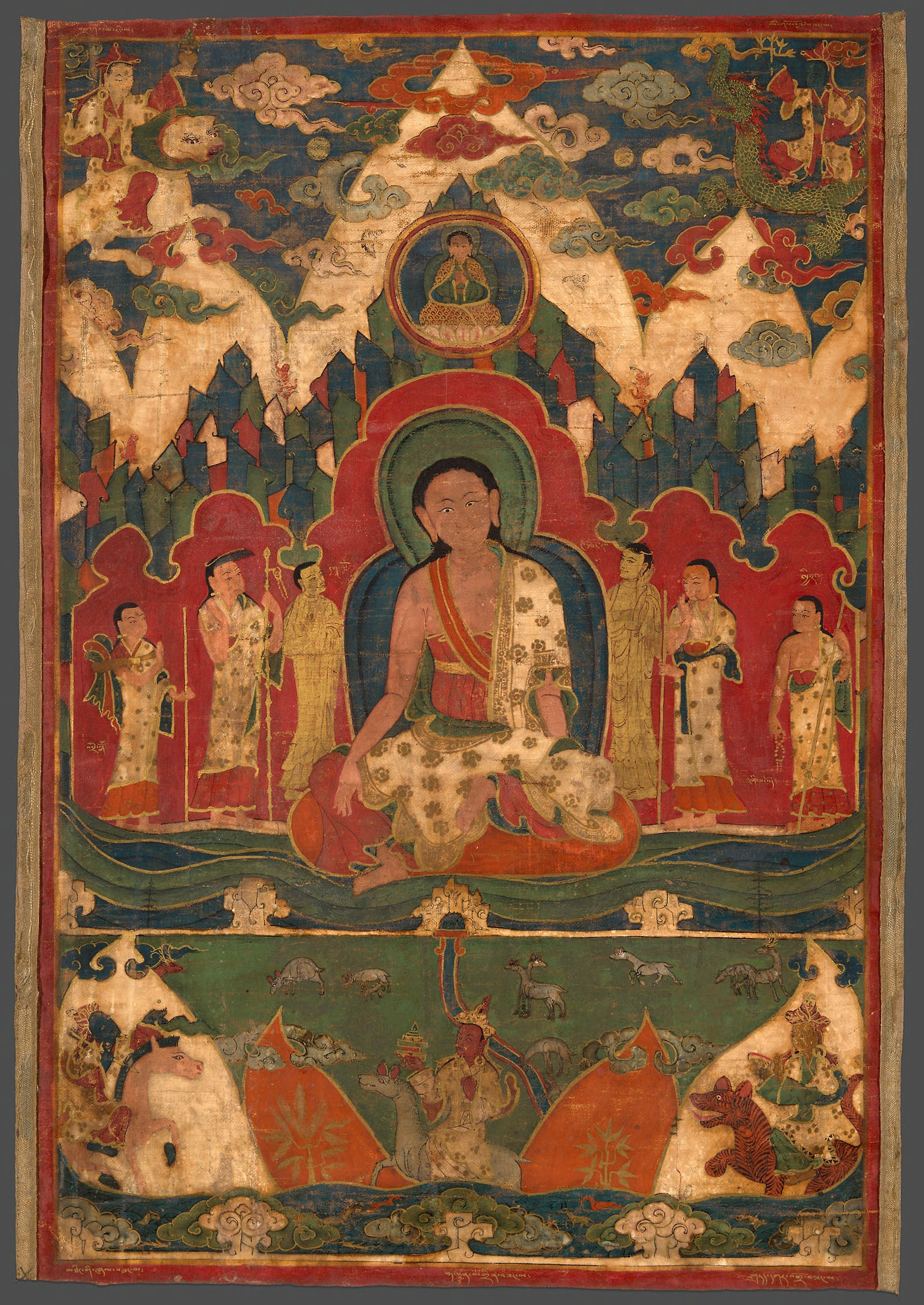
Milarepa on Mount Kailash

Tibetan Buddhist masters of various lineages are often referred to as mahasiddhas (grub thob chen po or tul shug). There is a long tradition of hagiographies of these Tibetan adepts, called namtar. Their deeds were first documented in the 12th century in the Vajryana text Caturasitisiddha - pravrtti.

Important Tibetan mahasiddhas include:

- Padmasambhava, who is said to have brought Buddhism to Tibet and tamed the harmful spirits of Tibet, converting them to Buddhism.
- Yeshe Tsogyal, Padmasambhava's consort
- Marpa the translator (1012–1097), a lay scholar-yogi who is a key figure in the Kagyu lineage
- Machig Labdrön (1055-1149), a female mahasiddha, the founding figure of the Chöd (Wylie: gcod) lineage.
- Milarepa (c. 11th - 12th century), a wilderness yogi, one of the most revered figures in Tibetan Buddhism
- Longchenpa, a key figure of the Nyingma school
- Je Tsongkhapa, the founder of what became the Gelug school
- Thangtong Gyalpo
- Drukpa Kunley
- Tsangnyön Heruka "The Madman Heruka from Tsang", (1452-1507)
- Shabkar Tsokdruk Rangdrol (1781-1851)
- Jigme Lingpa, an important terton (treasure revealer)

== See also ==
- Charyapada – Collection of Buddhist mystical poems
- Matsyendranatha – 10th century Hindu and Buddhist saint and yogi
- Secret Chiefs – Beings in various occult movements
- Twilight language – Secret language of tantric traditions
