= Banni Mata Temple =

Coordinates: 32.541°N 76.461°E

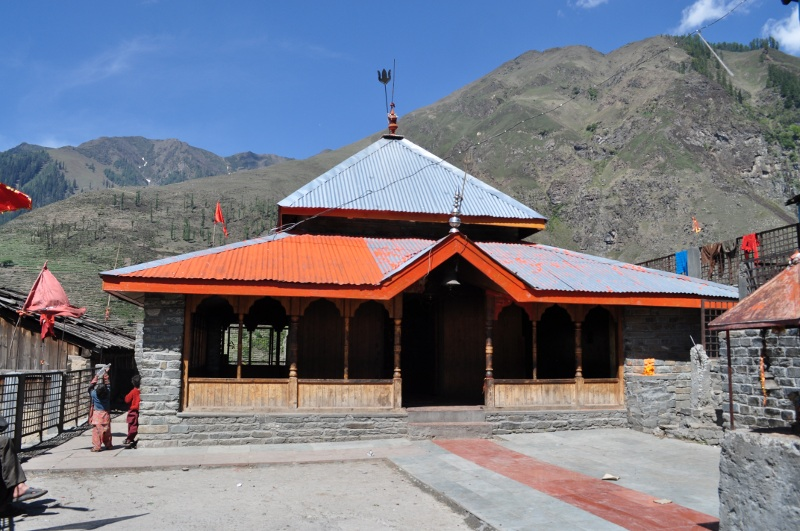
The Front View of the Banni Mata Temple at Chamba (Himachal Pradesh)

Banni Mata Temple, also known variously as the Mahakali Banni Mata Temple, is located in Chamba District, a hill station in the State of Himachal Pradesh in north India. This temple is situated at a height of 2,600 metres (8,500 ft), right at the base of Pir Panjal Range in the Chamba Valley. It is an ancient temple dedicated to Devi Kali, a goddess figure in Hinduism. The temple is surrounded by deep forests at the foot of the Himālayas. It is noted as Shakti Devi Temple too. It is near to Tundah village and just opposite to Manimahesh Peak. This temple is named as Banni because this place has a lot of Ban trees or Oak trees

== History ==
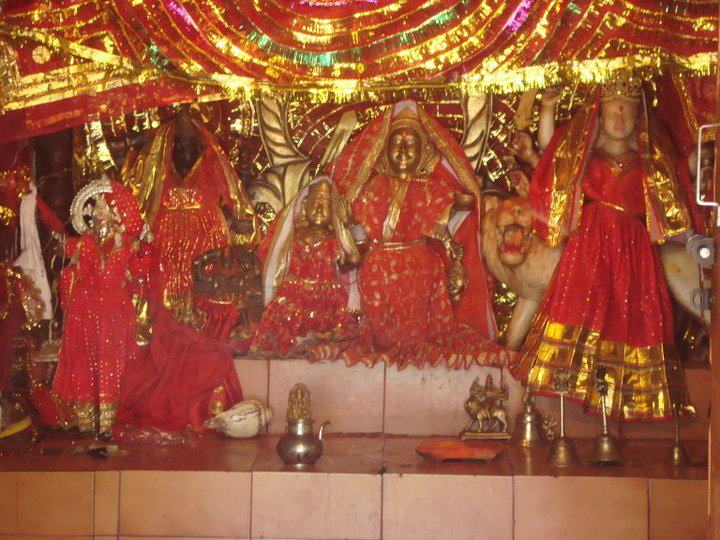
Other Devi Devta are also worshiped in the temple including Digu Wazir, Kelang Wazir, Chamunda Devi etc.

== Importance ==
The temple and the goddess are both very important in the Bharmour region. Shepherds crossing Kali Chho pass to Lahaul (Kali is for Goddess Kali and Chho is waterfall, the pass has a waterfall close to it) visit the temple to seek the goddesses blessings for a safe crossing and have done so for ages now. Pilgrims from all over the Bharmour region and other parts of Himachal find their way to the temple to pay obeisance to the goddess. It is believed Goddess Kali grants all wishes and gives children to couples who don't have anyone, making the journey with total devotion and fervor. Sometime around August, in the Bhadrapad month of the Hindu calendar, a fair is organized at the temple and it attracts devotees from all around. The fair, in typical Kali Puja style involves severing the heads of many goats. As soon as a goat's head is severed, the temple Shaman, called Chela in local language and bestowed with special powers by the goddess drinks the blood of the severed goat. It is said he can drink blood from as many goats as are severed at a time and that this ability is a reflection of his being in direct communion with the goddess. Liquor is another common offering and the Chela takes a gulp from each bottle offered.

In recent times, the pilgrimage to Banni Mata has become much easier with a road approaching Tundah, which leaves only 4 km to walk. With another road proposed to connect Banni, the trek will soon be over. However, the pilgrimage further up to Lyundi and Charola will continue to attract pilgrims by thousands.
