= Manimahesh Kailash Peak =

Mountain in Bharmour, Chamba, Himachal Pradesh, India

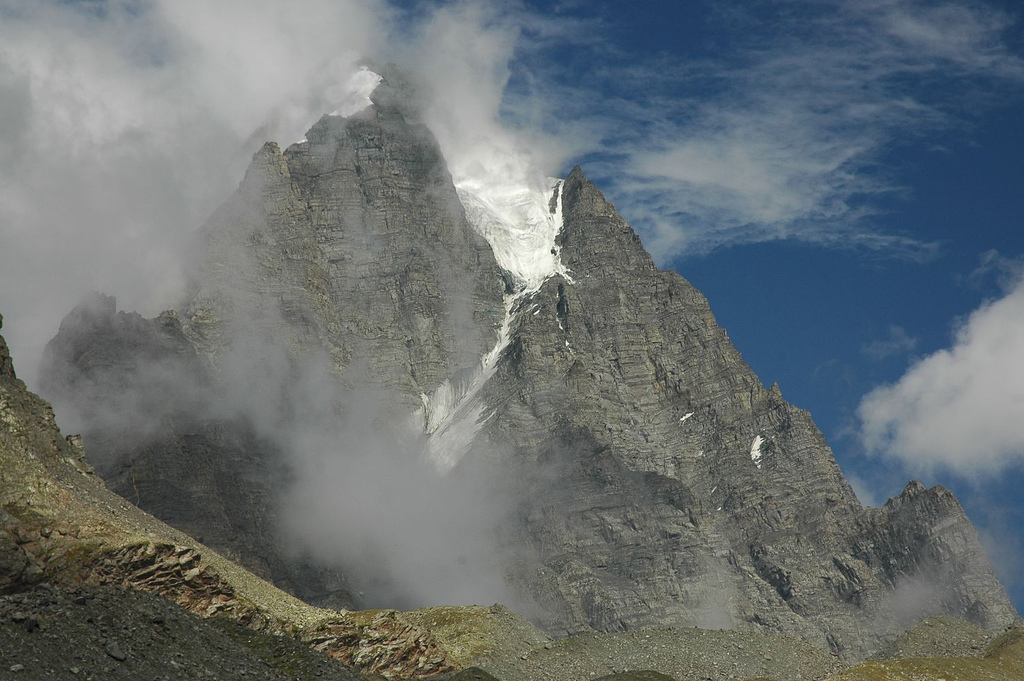

Highest point
- Elevation: 5,653 m (18,547 ft)
- Coordinates: 32°24′06″N 76°40′09″E

Naming
- English translation: Jewel in the crown of Mahesh (Shiva)
- Language of name: Sanskrit

Geography
- Location within Himachal Pradesh
- Location: Himachal Pradesh India
- Parent range: Pir Panjal Range, Himalayas

Climbing
- First ascent: 1968 (disputed)
- Easiest route: snow/ice climb

Manimahesh Kailash, also known as Chamba Kailash, is a mountain in the Himalayas, and one of the Panch Kailash mountains mentioned in Sanātana Dharma. At a height of 5,653 metres (18,547 ft), it stands high over the Manimahesh Lake, and is believed to be the abode of Lord Shiva, the Hindu deity. It is also believed that the Hindu deity Shiva's disciple Mani lives here, and that Shiva occasionally comes to this mountain for some time. It is located in the Bharmour subdivision of the Chamba district in the Indian state of Himachal Pradesh. It is the fifth most important peak among the group of five separate peaks in Himalayas in separate locations collectively known as the Panch Kailash or "Five Kailashas", the others being Mount Kailash in first place, Adi Kailash in second, Shikhar Kailash (Shrikhand Mahadev Kailash) in third, and Kinnaur Kailash in fourth place in terms of importance.

The peak is 26 kilometres (16 mi) from Bharmour in the Budhil valley. It is one of the major pilgrimage sites as well as a popular trekking destination in Himachal Pradesh. The Manimahesh Lake is at the base of the Kailash peak at 3,950 metres (12,960 ft) and is also held in deep veneration by people of Himachal Pradesh, particularly the Gaddi tribe of the region. In the month of Bhadon, on the eighth day of the new moon period, a fair is held in the precincts of the lake that attracts thousands of pilgrims.

Manimahesh Kailash has not been successfully summitted by mountaineers and thus remains a virgin peak. An attempt to climb the peak in 1968 by an Indo–Japanese team led by Nandini Patel was aborted. This failure is attributed to the divine prowess of the peak since it is revered as the holy mountain of Chamba according to the staunch devotees of the Manimahesh Lake and the peak.

The peak is visible from near Manimahesh Lake. There are two trekking routes to the lake. One is from Hadsar village that is mostly frequented by pilgrims and trekkers. The other route, village Holi, climbs up further and then descends to the lake. There is no other habitation, except for a small village on this route.

== Legends ==
There are several mythical legends narrated on the sanctity of this peak and the lake at its base.

In one popular legend, it is believed that Lord Shiva created Manimahesh after he married Goddess Parvati, who is worshipped as Mata Girija. There are many other legends narrated linking Lord Shiva and his show of displeasure through avalanches and blizzards that occur in the region.

According to a local myth, Lord Shiva is believed to reside in Manimahesh Kailash. A rock formation in the form of a Shivling on this mountain is considered as the manifestation of Lord Shiva. The snow field at the base of the mountain is called by the local people as Shiva's Chaugan (play field).

It is also believed that Manimahesh Kailash is invincible as no one has so far scaled it, in spite of claims to the contrary and the fact that much taller peaks have been scaled, including Mount Everest. According to one legend, a local tribe, a Gaddi, tried to climb along with a herd of sheep and is believed to have been turned into stone along with his sheep. The series of minor peaks around the principal peak are believed to be the remnants of the shepherd and his sheep.

Another legend narrated is that a snake also attempted to climb the mountain but failed and was converted into stone. Devotees believe that they can view the peak only if the Lord wishes so. Bad weather covering the peak with clouds is also explained as a displeasure of the Lord.

== Geography ==
Manimahesh Kailash or Mountain Kailash is in the watershed of the Budhil valley, which forms part the mid-Himalayan range of hills near Kugti pass and at Harsar. The perpetually snow-covered glacial peak, at the head of its own range, is the source of the sacred lake of Manimahesh situated beneath it. Manimahesh Ganga River originates in a cascade from the lake and joins the Budhil River on its left bank. This hill range is a contiguous spur that conjoins the main range near the Bara Banghal pass of the Pir Panjal range. After the Budhal River rises from the slopes of the Kukti (Kugati) pass and Bada Bangal pass, the watershed formed by the Budhil and Ravi rivers takes the form of an inverted triangle with its base at Khadamukh. Budhil itself is formed by several streams which rise from different faces of the Manimahesh Kailas peak. The streams which rise from the peak are: the 'Bhujla' (derived from Bhuja meaning the arm) from the left flank of the peak, which meets Bhudil (also spelt Budhal) below Kukti village; the Dhancho nala, rising from the snowy ranges of the southern flank of the peak, flows in northward direction; Androl stream carrying holy waters of the Manimahesh Lake flowing to the north of the peak and through the Barachundi Meadow, the Siv Karotar stream rises from the foot of the peak and joins Androl; and the Gauri stream from the Gauri Kund joins Androl. All these streams constitute the Dhancho nala that has a confluence with Budhil at Hadsar. In view of so many streams originating from the Manimhesah Peak and the Manimhaesh Lake, and all of which are also linked to legends and the annual yatra pilgrimage, the Budhal or Budhil River is also highly venerated by the Gaddi elders and is nicknamed as 'Bhujl'. Pir Pinjal lies in the lesser Himalayan Zone, which forms the central part of the state of Himachal Pradesh. The peak lies along the water shed between the Chenab River on the one side and Ravi and Beas on the other side.

A research study has been carried out on the glacial status of this peak and its range by the Geological Survey of India. It indicated that the Manimahesh Kailash peak is part of the range, which is 4.6 kilometres (2.9 mi) long. The average elevation of the studied peaks is 4,960 metres (16,270 ft). The glacial melt from this range flows towards the north and extends over an area of 4.58 square kilometres (1.77 mi^{2}). The ice content of the glacier has been assessed as 0.137 cubic km. The composition of this proglacial region is reported to be a mixture of ground/recessional moraines with linear country outcrops protruding out. The glaciation must have extended up to a little downstream of Dhanchu as revealed by the terminal moraine hump. During the last 37 years, the glacier receded by 1,075 metres (3,527 ft) with an average retreat of 29.05 metres (95.3 ft)/year. The area vacated is estimated at 0.679 square kilometres (0.262 mi^{2}).

== Climb ==
It is said that no one could climb this pure peak because it is said to be abode by Lord Shiva. Once a Gaddi tried to climb the peak it was believed that he dreamt of Lord Shiva calling him on the peak and Lord Shiva asked him to cut the sheep on every step he takes but asked not to look back. He started to climb the peak steps after steps he kept cutting the lambs he was carrying with him but few steps before reaching the peak he got confused that he was not carrying many sheep he killed and turned back. As soon as he looked back he turned into stone and couldn't climb. Since then, no one has ever tried to climb this peak and thus it is a virgin peak.

== See also ==
- Panch Kailash, lit. "Five Kailashas" referring to five sacred mountains named Kailash
- Sri Kailash, sixth mountain named Kailash which in not among the Panch Kailash.
- Bharmour
- Chamba, Himachal Pradesh
- Lake Manasarovar
- Pir Panjal Range
- Himalaya
- Manimahesh Lake
