= Chaurasi Temple Bharmour =

Temple in Bharmour, Himachal Pradesh, India

Coordinates: 32.443°N 76.537°E

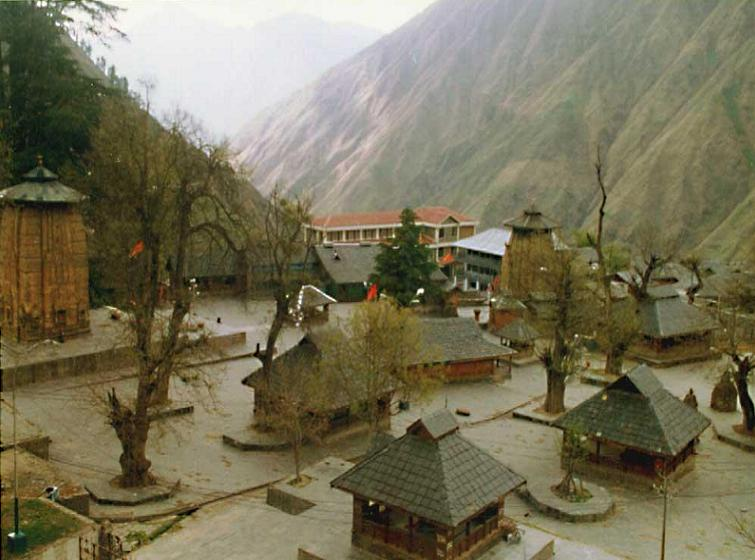
Chaurasi temple in Bharmour

Chaurasi Temple is a Hindu temple complex consisting of 84 different shrines, located in the center of Bharmour town of Chamba district in Himachal Pradesh, India. It holds immense religious importance because of temples built around 1400 years ago. Life of people in Bharmour centers around the temple complex-Chaurasi, named so because of 84 shrines built in the periphery of Chaurasi Temple. Chaurasi is the Hindi word for number eighty four. The beautiful valabhi-Shikhara style architecture of Manimahesh occupies the center of the complex. Chaurasi Temple Complex was built approximately in 7th century, although repairs of many temples have been carried out in later period. There are 84 big and small temples in Chaurasi temple complex.

Chaurasi is a spacious level ground in center of Bharmour where the galaxy of temples mostly in the form of 84 Shivlingas exists. The Chaurasi Temple Complex offers a delightful, clean and a scenic view. Another temple built in the same style is that of Lord Vishnu cast in his Narsimha avatar.

== History ==
The Chaurasi temple was built by Raja Meru Verman of Bharmour, in honor of the 84 siddhas or yogis who had come from Kurukshetra and had meditated there, while they were passing Bharmour on their way to Manimahesh Lake. They blessed the king with ten sons and a daughter, Champavati, as he had no heir. It is said that the pilgrimage to Manimahesh Lake is incomplete without paying obeisance in these temples due to the Dharmeshvar Mahadev (Dharamraj) Temple as one of the most revered by Hindus, and bathing in the Bharmani Mata temple pool of Goddess Brahmani, 4 km from Bharmour, Himachal Pradesh. The entire area and the temples, are dedicated to the worship of God Shiva and Shakti, due to the belief of Manimahesh Kailash Peak, being their abode and the promise of Moksha.

== See also ==
- Manimahesh Kailash Peak
- Ātman (Hinduism)
- Brahman
