= Khadgapa =

Tenth-century Indian Buddhist

15th century mural of Khadgapa at Palcho Monastery in Tibet

Khadgapa was an Indian Buddhist mahasiddha who lived during the Pala rule of East India and has been placed in the first half of the tenth century. He is revered by practitioners of tantric Buddhism in India and Tibet.

== Life as per hagiography ==
Khadgapa was born into a low-caste family of farmers in Magadha during the rule of the Pala Empire. He decided not to follow the path of his family and became a professional thief. One day after he had been unsuccessful in robbing a wealthy residence in a town in Magadha, he hid in a cremation ground, and there he found the yogin Carpati. Khadgapa beseeched the yogin to teach him the power of invincibility. Carpati gave the thief initiation and instructed him to circle around the statue of Avalokitesvara in the Gaurisankar temple of Magadha for 21 days, non-stop day and night. He also said at the end of the 21 days, a large snake will appear between the feet of the statue and the thief must seize it by the head without fear to gain the siddhi he desires. Khadgapa did this, and when he grabbed the snake, it is said to have transformed into a glowing sword.

Following this, Khadgapa began to spread the Buddha's teachings around Magadha. It is said that after this, he was attained nirvana.
