= Manimahesh Lake =

Lake in Mani Mahesh Kailash Parvat, Himachal Pradesh, India

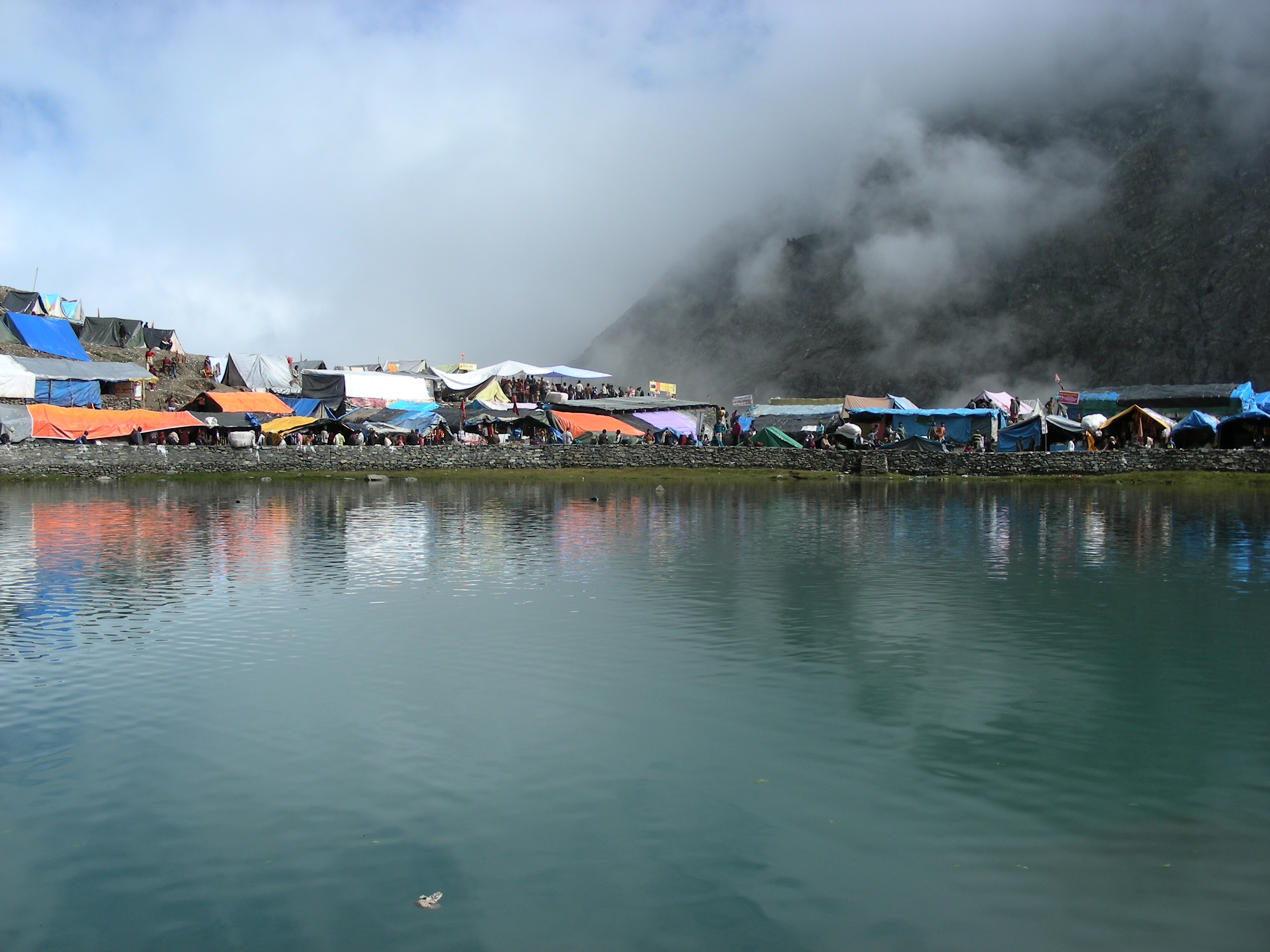

- Location within Himachal Pradesh Location within India
- Location: Manimahesh range, Himachal Pradesh
- Coordinates: 32°23′42″N 76°38′14″E
- Primary outflows: Manimahesh Ganga (tributary of Ravi)
- Basin countries: India
- Surface elevation: 4,190 m (13,750 ft)
- Frozen: October through June

Manimahesh Lake is considered a sacred lake in the Hindu religion. This lake is situated on the Manimahesh Kailash mountain, one of the Panch Kailash mountains mentioned in the Sanatan religion.Manimahesh (also known as Dal Lake, Manimahesh) is a high altitude lake (elevation 4,080 metres (13,390 ft)) situated close to the Manimahesh Kailash Peak in the Pir Panjal Range of the Himalayas, in the Bharmour subdivision of Chamba district of the Indian state of Himachal Pradesh. The religious significance of this lake is next to that of the Lake Manasarovar in Tibet.

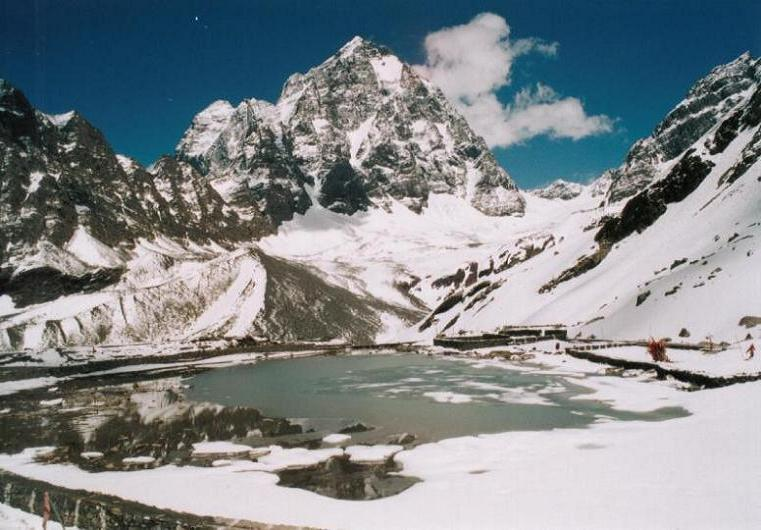
Manimahesh lake

The lake is the venue of a highly revered pilgrimage trek undertaken during the month of August/September corresponding to the month of Bhadon according to the Hindu calendar, on the eighth day of the new moon period. It is known as the ‘Manimahesh Yatra’. The Government of Himachal Pradesh has declared it as a state-level pilgrimage.

There are two trekking routes to the lake. One is from Hadsar village that is mostly frequented by pilgrims and trekkers. This route is easier and has arrangements for basic food and accommodation during the pilgrimage season. The other one is from village Holi. This route climbs up further and then descends to the lake. There is no other habitation, except for a small village on this route.

== Etymology ==
Etymology of 'Manimahesh' signifies a "jewel (Mani) on Shiva's (Mahesh's) crown". According to a local legend, the moon-rays reflected from the jewel can be seen from Manimahesh Lake on clear full moon night (which is a rare occasion). However, it has been inferred that such a phenomenon could be the result of reflection of light from the glacier that embellishes the peak in the form of a serpent around Shiva's neck.

== Legend ==
=== Gaddis' legend of Shiva ===
Gaddis (shepherd) tribe of this region, who reside in the Gaddi Valley which is the name of the upper regions of Ravi River where the Mount Chamba Kailash lies, adopted Shiva as their deity. According to their popular legend, it is believed that Shiva created Manimahesh after he married Parvati, who is worshipped as Mata Gorja. There are many legends narrated linking Shiva and his show of displeasure through acts of avalanches and blizzards that occur in the region. Shiva performed penance on the banks of Manimahesh Lake. Further, according to the legend, the Shiva, who lived in Mount Kailash, the highest mountain of the state, gifted the Gaddis with a Chuhali topi (pointed cap), which they wear traditionally along with their other dress of chola (coat) and dora (a long black cord about 10–15 m long). The Gaddis started calling the land of this mountainous region as 'Shiv Bhumi' ("Land of Shiva") and themselves as devotees of Shiva. Before Shiva married Parvati at Lake Manasarovar and became the "universal parents of the universe", Shiva created the Mount Kailash in Himachal Pradesh and made it his abode. He made the Gaddis his devotees. The land where Gaddis lived extended from 15 miles (24 km) west of Bharmaur, upstream of the confluence of Budhil and Ravi rivers, up to Manimahesh. Manimahesh was also considered the abode of the Trimurti, namely, Shiva, Vishnu, and Brahma. Manimahesh was reckoned as the heaven (Kailasha) of Shiva. The waterfall seen at the Dhancho on the way to Manimahesh Lake, and which emanates from the lake, was considered as the heaven (Vaikuntha) of Vishnu. The heaven of Bramha is cited as a mound overlooking the Bharmaur city.

The Gaddis also believe that Shiva resides in the Mount Kailash for six months, whereafter he moves to the netherworld handing over the reigns to Vishnu. The day he departs to the netherworld is observed by the Gaddis reverentially every year, which is the Janmashtami day, the eighth day of the month of Bhadon (August), the birthday of Krishna (an incarnation of Vishnu). Shiva returned from the netherworld to Bharamaur at the end of February, before the night of his wedding and this day is observed as Maha Shivaratri); Gaddis observe this also as a festive day since Shiva and Parvati returned to Mount Kailash in the Gaddi land.

A rare event of the first sun's rays falling on the Manimahesh peak is seen in reflection in the lake like a saffron tilaka. This display in the lake has enhanced the legendary belief of the Gaddis on the sanctity of Manimahesh Lake at the base of the Mount Kailash, which they visit on an annual pilgrimage. This event has also contributed to the practice of taking bath in the lake on Janmashtami day or Radhashtami day, fifteen days after the birth of Krishna.

=== Shiva's Dhancho legend of Bhasmasura ===
Another legend in which Shiva himself is tricked is narrated. According to this narration linked to Dhancho where pilgrims spend a night on their way to Manimahesh Lake, Shiva, pleased with the devotion of one of his ardent devotees Bhasmasura (an asura or demon) bestowed a boon, which gave powers to Bhasmasura under which Bhasmasura touching anyone would reduce that person to ashes. Bhasmasura wanted to try this boon on Shiva himself. He, therefore, followed Shiva to touch him and get rid of him. However, Shiva managed to escape and enter into the waterfall at Dhancho and take shelter in a cave behind the rolling waters of the fall. Bhasmasura could not get through the waterfall. Then, Vishnu intervened and killed Bhasmasura. Since then the waterfall is considered holy.

=== Shiva's legend of Manimhaesh Lake ===
According to legend about the Manimhaesh Lake, Shiva performed penance for several hundred years here. The water cascades sprang out from his matted hair and took the form of the lake. The lake as formed appears like a saucer. It has two distinct parts. The larger part has icy cold water, called the 'Shiv Karotri' (the bathing place of Shiva). The smaller part of the lake, which is hidden by the bushes, has lukewarm water and is called 'Gauri Kund', the bathing place of Parvati, Shiva's consort. Thus, men and women bathe in different parts of the lake. According to rites, the dip (called locally as naun) in the lake is taken four times, if permitted or otherwise only once.

== Geography ==
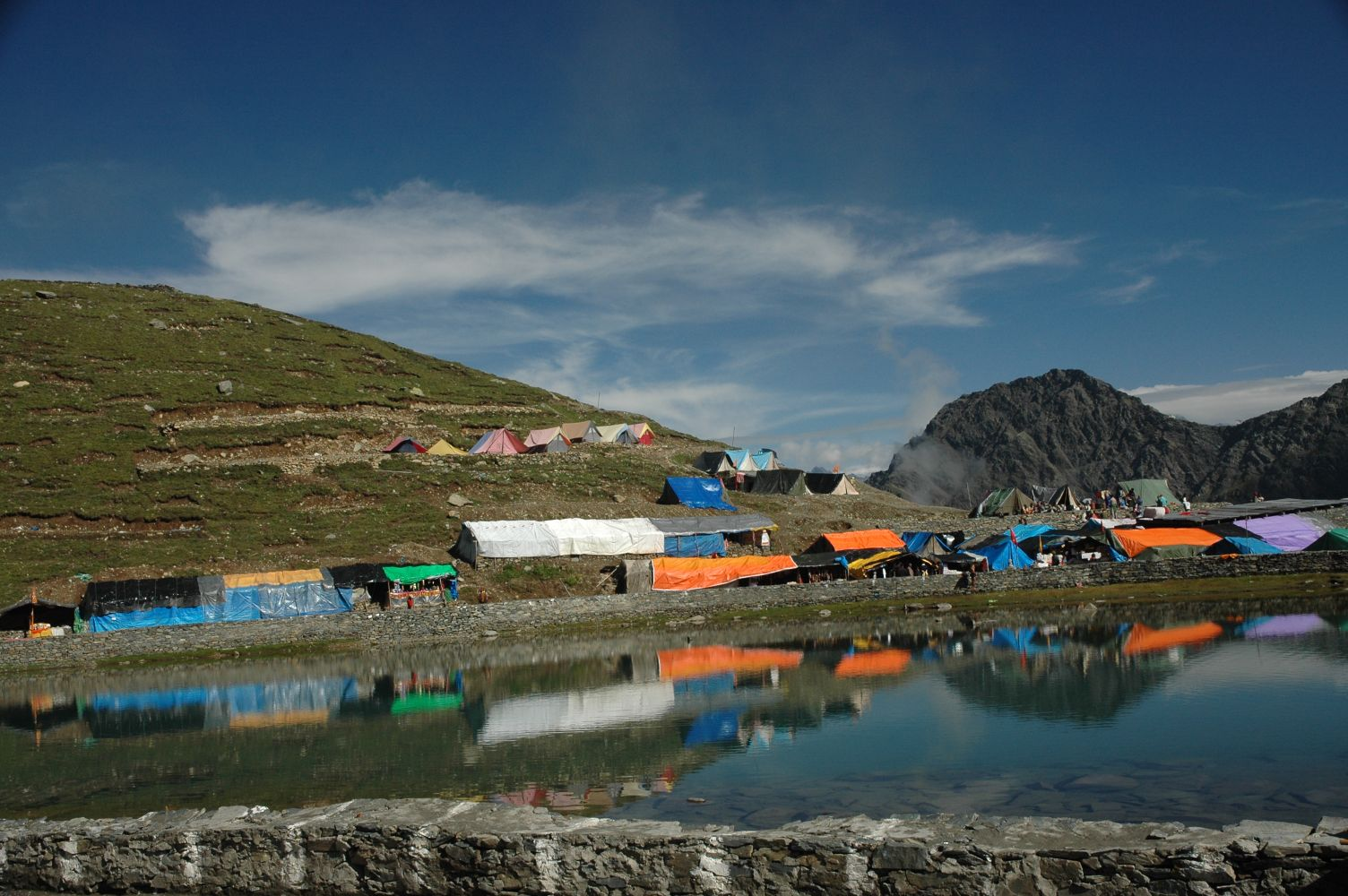
A small lake with pilgrims living in tents during the annual Manimahesh Yatra.

=== Topography ===
The lake, of glacial origin, is in the upper reaches of the Ghoi nala(refer Leomann maps:India Himalaya Map 4) which is a tributary of Budhil river, a tributary of the Ravi River in Himachal Pradesh. However, the lake is the source of a tributary of the Budhil River, known as ‘Manimahesh Ganga’. The stream originates from the lake in the form of a fall at Dhancho. The mountain peak is a snow clad tribal glen of Brahamur in the Chamba district of manimahesh range. The highest peak is the Manimahesh Kailas, also called ‘Chamba Kailash' (elevation 5,656 metres or 18,556 ft) overlooking the lake. The lake, considered a glacial depression, is sourced by snow-melt waters from the surrounding hill slopes. Towards the end of June with ice beginning to melt, numerous small streams break up everywhere, which together with the lush green hills and the myriad of flowers give the place a truly remarkable view. The snow field at the base of the mountain is called by the local people as Shiva’s Chaugan Shiva's playground. According to a belief, Shiva stayed here with his consort Parvati.

=== Lake and its precincts ===
Even though the Manimahesh Lake is of small size with shallow depth, its location, directly below Manimahesh Kailas peak and several other peaks and dangling glaciers, is an "inspiration even to the least devout pilgrim."

Trekking in the last reach is through the glacier fields of the lake. However, on the way, the walk is through the valley of flowers and wild medicinal herbs up to the lake. The lake is situated at the centre of a snowy field touching the sacred peak. The lake is surrounded by sandy boulders, small hilly mounds and prickly dry bushes, and there is no sign of any grass. It is called Shiv Chaugan (play ground of Shiva). The lake appears as if it has penetrated the rugged valley. On a clear day the reflection of the abode of Shiva, the Kailash Mountain can be seen on the lake surface. All the year round, the place remains desolate, without any inhabitants, because none dares to stay here. The air is fresh but icy cold. There are almost no fauna in the lake at its precincts – no ants, snakes or any kind of wild life. A few Bird species are sighted rarely. The silence of the place is broken only when the pilgrims visit the place in large numbers, an evening before the holy dip (locally known as naun) in the lake.

In the periphery of the lake, now there is a marble image of Shiva, which is worshipped by pilgrims. The image is called the Chaumukha. The lake and its surroundings present an impressive view. The still, clear and unpolluted waters of the lake reflect the snow-capped peaks that overlook the valley. There is also a small temple in the shikhara style on the periphery of the lake. A brass image of Lakshmi Devi known as Mahishasuramardini is deified in the temple.

== Pilgrimage trekking ==
Manimahesh is approached from three routes: Spiti-Kugti-Manimahesh route - pilgrims from Lahaul and Spiti pass through Kugti pass, Kangra/Mandi-Tyari -Manimahesh route - pilgrims from Kangra and Mandi take the Karwarsi pass or Jalsu pass via Tyari village near Holi in Bharmour, and Chamba-Bharmour–Hadsar-Manimahesh route - the easiest and popular route is from Chamba via Bharmour.

The sippi caste have important role when the challas seeks the permission from this caste after that challas get dip into the wholly lake

=== Chamba-Bharmour–Hadsar-Manimahesh route ===
The holy pilgrimage to the Manimahesh Lake (revered by local people as resting place of Shiva) is supported by the Government of Himachal Pradesh, Manimahesh Pilgrimage Committee and several voluntary organizations. For the Gaddi tribal population of the region, pilgrimage to the lake is most holy. It is held every year during the Hindu month of Badon on Radhastami, the 15th day following the festival of Janmashtami, corresponding to the Gregorian month of August or September. The Yatra or Jatra, as it is called, is also popularly known as the 'Manimahesh Yatra'. It is heralded by a procession known locally as "holy chhari" (holy stick carried by the pilgrims on their shoulders) trek undertaken by pilgrims and sadhus. Pilgrims undertake the holy trek barefoot and cover a distance of 14 kilometres (8.7 mi) from the nearest road point of Hadsar to the Manimahesh Lake. Shiva is the presiding deity of the yatra. The colorful procession of the "chhari" is accompanied by singing and recitation of hymns in praise of Shiva. The Chhari trek, considered a tough trek, follows a set ancient route with stops at the designated places. To facilitate this trek, pilgrims are provided with facilities of transport (jeeps up to road ends), food and medical facilities and so forth.

The holy trek starts from the Laxmi Narayan temple and the Dashnami Akhara in Chamba town, with the sacred stick ('Chhari') of Gur Charpathnath carried by the pilgrims with participation of sadhus. The trek to the lake takes about 6 days. After the procession arrives at the lake, ceremonies are held all through the night. On the following day, pilgrims take a holy dip (naun) in the lake. After taking bath in the holy waters of the lake, pilgrims circumambulate the lake three times as an act of reverence, seeking blessings of the Shiva. However, before taking a final dip in the Manimahesh Lake, women devotees take a dip at the Gauri Khund, which is situated about a mile short of the lake while men take bath at Shiv Karotri a part of the main lake. The belief is that Parvati, Shiva's consort bathed at the Gauri Khund, while Shiva took his bath at the Shiv Karotri. State priests of Bharmaur Brahmin family perform the worship (Pujas) in all temples within the lake precincts.

The most popular and easiest route, Bharmour–Hadsar-Dhanchho-Manimahesh trek, takes two days with an overnight stay at Dhanchho, and the highest altitude touched is 4,115 metres (13,501 ft). Season to be undertaken is June to October and it has a gentle grade. The path leading to the lake is well maintained. Tents are available for hire at Bharmour or Chamba, Himachal Pradesh. Ponies are hired by some devotees for the trek. Direct trekking from Chamba is also an option undertaken by the devout, which is a nine-day trek; the route followed is Rakh (20 kilometres (12 mi)), Bharmaur, Hadsar (12 kilometres (7.5 mi)), Dhancho (7 kilometres (4.3 mi)) and Manimahesh (7.5 kilometres (4.7 mi)) with a brief halt at Bhiram Ghati. The return trip follows the same route.

Bharmour–Hadsar-Dhanchho-Manimahesh trek involves a 13 kilometres (8.1 mi) track from Hadsar village to the Manimahesh Lake, with a night halt at open and flat meadow land of Dhanchho where free kitchens for pilgrims and rentable tented accommodation is available during August–September. But many prefer to go and pitch their tents next to the lake to feel a divine experience. En route, there is waterfall at Gauri Nallah known as the Dhancho fall. The steep trail from Dancho has undergone significant improvements over the years, and while the Bandar Ghati (lit. Monkey Valley) section was once a challenging climb that required people to crawl like monkeys (hence the name bandar/monkey valley for this section), a new safer path has since been constructed. Despite this, some still choose the original Bandar Ghati route, more difficult route for the adventure. In the past, on the trek from Dhancho, the bridge over the Manimahesh river was crossed to reach the left bank of the valley. After 2 kilometres (1.2 mi), the river was again crossed, over another wooden bridge, to the right bank. From this point, the climb passes through many zigzag paths along flowered meadows. Birch trees are seen in the vicinity, which indicates a gain in altitude as the trek proceeds. Along this stretch of the trek route, there are a number community kitchens (eateries) at about 3,600 metres (11,800 ft) elevation. From this location, the trail to Manimahesh Lake could be discerned. The waterfall, flowing from the lake, is also seen at this stage. A further trek of 1.5 kilometres (0.93 mi) through the grassy ridges leads to the Manimahesh Lake.

== See also ==
- Banni Mata Temple
- Himalaya
  - Bharmour
  - Chamba, Himachal Pradesh
  - Lake Manasarovar
  - Pir Panjal Range
- Panch Kailash, lit. "Five Kailashas" referring to five scared mountains named Kailash
  - Mount Kailash, among Panch Kailash
  - Adi Kailash, among Panch Kailash
  - Kinnaur Kailash, among Panch Kailash
  - Manimahesh Kailash, among Panch Kailash
  - Shrikhand Mahadev, among Panch Kailash
- Sri Kailash, not among Panch Kailash
- Om Parvat
- Om beach
