= Thaganapa =

Thaganapā (Sanskrit: थगनपा; c. 800 - 1100 CE), known as the Compulsive Liar or Master of the Lie, was an Indian Vajrayana Buddhist Mahasiddha. Born into a low-caste family in eastern India, Thaganapa was a criminal and conman before being taught of karma and dhyana, leading him to meditate for seven years. Thaganapa was initiated into the tantric method of "removing water in the ear by means of water" as a way to realize emptiness (Mahamudra), ultimately realizing that reality is neither truth nor deception. One of the eighty-four siddhas (Siddhācāryas) of the Sahajayāna school, Thaganapa was a part of an esoteric movement of Tantric Buddhism which spread across India and the Himalayas.
