= Ghantapa =

Ghaṇṭāpa
- Tibetan thangka of Ghantapa by Situ Panchen, c. 18th century
- Title: Mahasiddha

Personal life
- Born: c. 800 Nalanda
- Died: c. 1100
- Partner: Vajrayogini
- Education: Nalanda mahavihara

Religious life
- Religion: Tibetan Buddhism
- Lineage: Chakrasmamvara

Senior posting
- Teacher: Darikapa

Ghaṇṭāpa (Sanskrit: घण्टाप, romanized: Ghaṇṭāpa, lit. 'Bell Master'; c. 800 - 1100 CE), known as the Celibate Monk or the Bellringer, was an Indian Buddhist Mahasiddha of the Vajrayana tradition. Born into a royal family, Ghantapa rejected the throne to become a monk and siddha, later becoming for both his celibacy and lovemaking.

== Life per hagiography ==
Born as the son of a Nalanda king, Ghantapa renounced his royal heritage for the sake of joining the famous Nalanda mahavihara as a Buddhist monk. Tired of the scholastic life, Ghantapa became a wandering yogi, eentually meeting the guru Darikapa and receiving instruction to travel to Pataliputra. There, he lived under a large tree on the edge of the royal city and the forest. The local ruler, King Devapala, challenged that whoever breaks Ghantapa's celibacy shall half his kingdom. A courtesan named Darima relentlessly begged to become a devotee of Ghantapa until he accepted. Darima built a hut for Ghantapa and sent her beautiful daughter to tempt him. The daughter managed to sleep in his hut where the two eventually touched bodies and had tantric sex, birthing a child.

When King Devapala learned the yogi has been seduced, Ghantapa and his lover fled with their child but were intercepted by the King and many citizens. Confronted, Ghantapa threw his child and a jar to the ground, causing the earth goddess to open the ground and a geyser to burst up to catch the infant, the child transforming into a thunderbolt and the jar into a bell. Ghantapa and his lover then flew up into the air, becoming the deities Saṃvara and Vajravārāhī, joined in the loving father-mother union. The bodhisattva Avalokiteśvara appeared and stepped over the geyser, saving everyone from drowning. Hovering over them all as the bellringer, Ghantapa sang a doha:

[...] The sage rejects nothing
Yet the unrealized fool
Five times poisoned
Is lost forever in samsara.

== Legacy ==
Gantapa is also known for his associated with Cakrasaṃvara Tantra, his transmission of the ‘five limbs’ of the Panchakrama Chakrasmamvara lineage from Vajrayogini, and the lu nag dril sum formula of three siddhas.
