= Kankaripa =

Kaṅkārīpa (Sanskrit: कङ्कारिप; c. 800 - 1100 CE) was a Mahasiddha known in the Vajrayana tradition. Born of a common household, he married a woman of his own caste and, after a few years of love, she died. Aggrieved, he lingered at the shmashana cremation grounds until a wandering yogi approached him, teaching Kankaripa how life is impermanent, suffering is the reality for every person in Saṃsāra, and the only instruction he can give is the path to awakening. So the yogi initiated Kankaripa and he spent six years in deep meditation, imagining his deceased wife as a dakini until a clear light dawned within him.
