= Çağan =

Village and municipality in Azerbaijan

Coordinates: 40.7246°N 48.5632°E

Çağan is a village and municipality in the Shamakhi Rayon of Azerbaijan. It has a population of 331. The municipality consists of the villages of Çağan, Birinci Çağan, and İkinci Çağan.
