= Chagan, Kazakhstan =

Chagan Шаған
- Urban-type settlement, closed city
- Location within Kazakhstan
- Coordinates: 50°37′16″N 79°15′9″E
- Country: Kazakhstan
- Region: Abai Region
- Founded: 1950

Population (2015)
  - Total: 0
- Postal code: none

Chagan (Kazakh: Шаған, romanized: Shaghan; formerly Russian: Семипалатинск-4, romanized: Semipalatinsk-4) was an urban-type settlement in the Abai Region. The settlement is included in the city administration of Semey (former Semipalatinsk). The administrative center and the only locality of Chaganskoy village administration. It is located 74 km from the city of Semey on the bank of the Irtysh River. Code KATO - 632863100.

== History ==
Railway station, 80 km north-west of Semey. Founded in 1950, abandoned after the withdrawal of Russian troops in 1995.

Before the collapse of the Soviet Union Chagan was a military base, which was home to 10 to 11 thousand residents, mostly staff located 10 km south-west of the town at a military airfield "Chagan" situated for long-range strategic aviation.

There was a kindergarten, a secondary school and a stadium. In 1995, all military units were withdrawn to Russia; the town passed to the Republic of Kazakhstan, after which the population declined sharply.
