= Birinci Çağan =

- Location within Azerbaijan
- Coordinates: 40°43′25″N 48°33′38″E
- Country: Azerbaijan
- Rayon: Shamakhi
- Municipality: Çağan
- Time zone: UTC+4 (AZT)
  - Summer (DST): UTC+5 (AZT)

Birinci Çağan (also, Bash-Chagan, Chagan, and Chagan Pervoye) is a village in the Shamakhi Rayon of Azerbaijan. The village forms part of the municipality of Çağan.
