= Shagan =

Shagan may refer to:

- Shagan (Irtysh), a river in Kazakhstan
- Shagan (Ural), a river in Kazakhstan and Russia
- Shagan (lake, Abai Region), an artificial lake in Kazakhstan
- Chagan (lake, Kulunda Steppe), a lake in Kazakhstan and Russia
- Şağan (or Shagan), a settlement and municipality in Baku, Azerbaijan
- Sary Shagan, an anti-ballistic missile testing range in Kazakhstan

== People with the surname ==
- Ethan H. Shagan (born 1971), American historian of early modern Britain
- Steve Shagan (1927–2015), American novelist, screenwriter, and television and film producer

== See also ==
- Chagan (disambiguation)
