= İkinci Çağan =

- Location within Azerbaijan
- Coordinates: 40°43′53″N 48°32′54″E
- Country: Azerbaijan
- Rayon: Shamakhi
- Municipality: Çağan
- Time zone: UTC+4 (AZT)
  - Summer (DST): UTC+5 (AZT)

İkinci Çağan (also, Chagan Vtoroy, Chagan Vtoroye, and Chagan-Mimed-Salim) is a village in the Shamakhi Rayon in Azerbaijan. The village now forms part of the municipality of Çağan.
