= Jayananda =

Jayananda is a given name. Notable people with the name include:

- Jayananda Dasa (fl. 1962–1977), American religious figure
- Jayananda Lama (1956–2022), Nepalese folk singer
- Jayananda Singh (born 1999), Indian footballer
- Jayananda Warnaweera (1960–2025), Sri Lankan cricketer
