= Chowgan Castle =

Castle in Yazd Province, Iran

Chowgan castle
- قلعه چوگان

General information
- Type: Castle
- Location: Bafq County, Iran

Chowgan castle (Persian: قلعه چوگان) is a historical castle located in Bafq County in Yazd Province, The longevity of this fortress dates back to the Qajar dynasty.
