= Chaugan =

Term used in Himachal, India, for plains

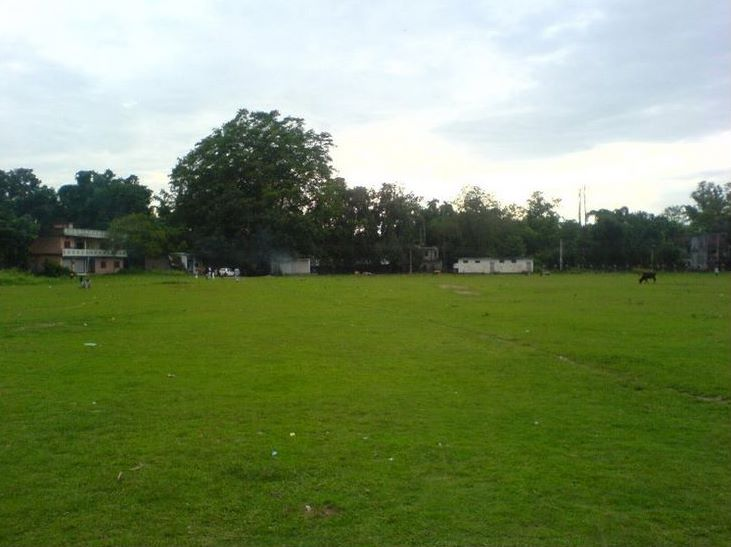
Jaisinghpur's chaugan

Chaugan is the term used in Himachal for plains. The chaugan of Himachal Pradesh are at Chamba district, Sujanpur, and at Jaisinghpur.

== Chaugan (region) ==
Chaugan, which is located at Sujanpur Tihra, is the largest region in Himachal Pradesh in India. It existed at the time of Raja Sansar Chahd, who was the king of Sujanpur Tihra. The fort of Sansar Chand is located about 1/2 km away from Chaugan.

== Chaugan (sport) ==
In the Middle East, Chaugan is a game similar to Golf and Polo. It involves a ball, horses, and sticks (gili). The word can also mean "four corners". In this sense the word probably refers to the playing ground on which the game is played. Qutb-ud-din Aibak, who was a general at Muhammad Ghori's Delhi Sultanate, died as a result of a fall from his horse while playing Chaugan.
