= Bharmour =

Village in Himachal Pradesh, India

- Village
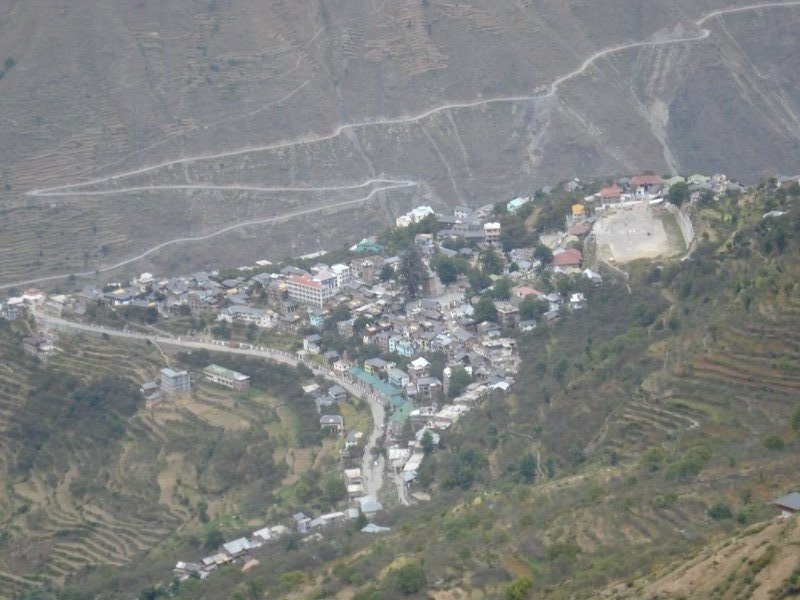
- Bharmour, view from the top

- Location in Himachal Pradesh, India Bharmour (India)
- Coordinates: 32.4428°N 76.5329°E
- Country: India
- State: Himachal Pradesh
- District: Chamba

Population (2011)
  - Total: 1,374

Language
  - Official: Hindi
  - Additional official: Sanskrit
- Time zone: UTC+5:30 (IST)
- Sex ratio: 916 ♂/♀

Bharmour is a village in the Indian state of Himachal Pradesh. Located in Chamba district, it is known for the Chaurasi Temple complex. Bharmour is associated with the historical Brahampura, the capital of Chamba State. Bharmour is also a constituent assembly for the Himachal Pradesh Vidhan Sabha.

== History ==
The region was settled by Kolian tribes around 2nd century BCE. In 6th century AD, King Meru founded the Chamba State and Brahampura served as its capital. In 920 CE, Raja Sahil Varman shifted the capital of the Chamba State to Chamba.

== Geography ==
Bharmour is located about 60kms to the south-east of Chamba.

== Demographics ==
As of 2011 Indian Census, Bharmour had a total population of 1,374, of which 717 were males and 657 were females. Population within the age group of 0 to 6 years was 168. The effective literacy rate of 7+ population of Bharmour was 86.15 %, of which male literacy rate was 92.15% and female literacy rate was 79.73 %. The Scheduled Castes and Scheduled Tribes population was 203 and 961 respectively. Bharmour had 319 households in 2011.

== Notable places ==
=== Chaurasi Temple ===
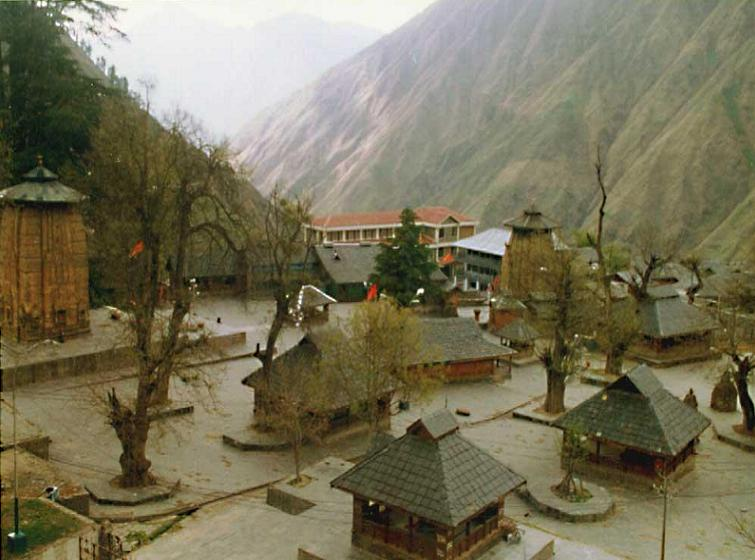
View of Chaurasi Temple

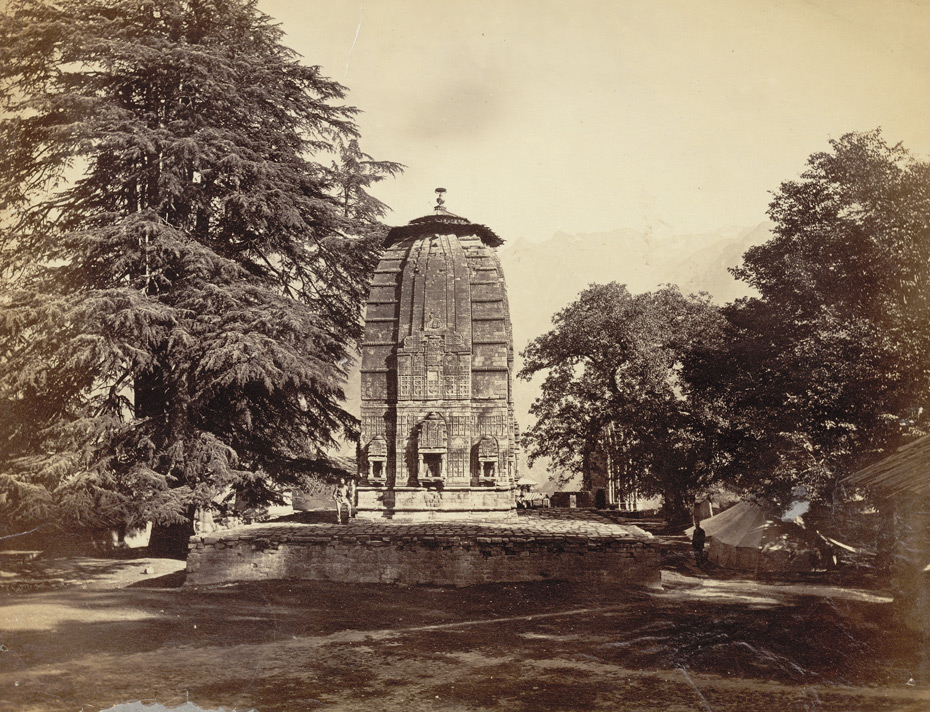
Manimaheshvara Temple, Bharmour, in the 19th century

Chaurasi Temple is located in the centre of Bharmour town. There are 84 shrines built in the periphery of Chaurasi Temple. "Chaurasi" is the Hindi word for the number eighty-four. The temple complex was built approximately the 7th century.

==== Major temples in the complex ====
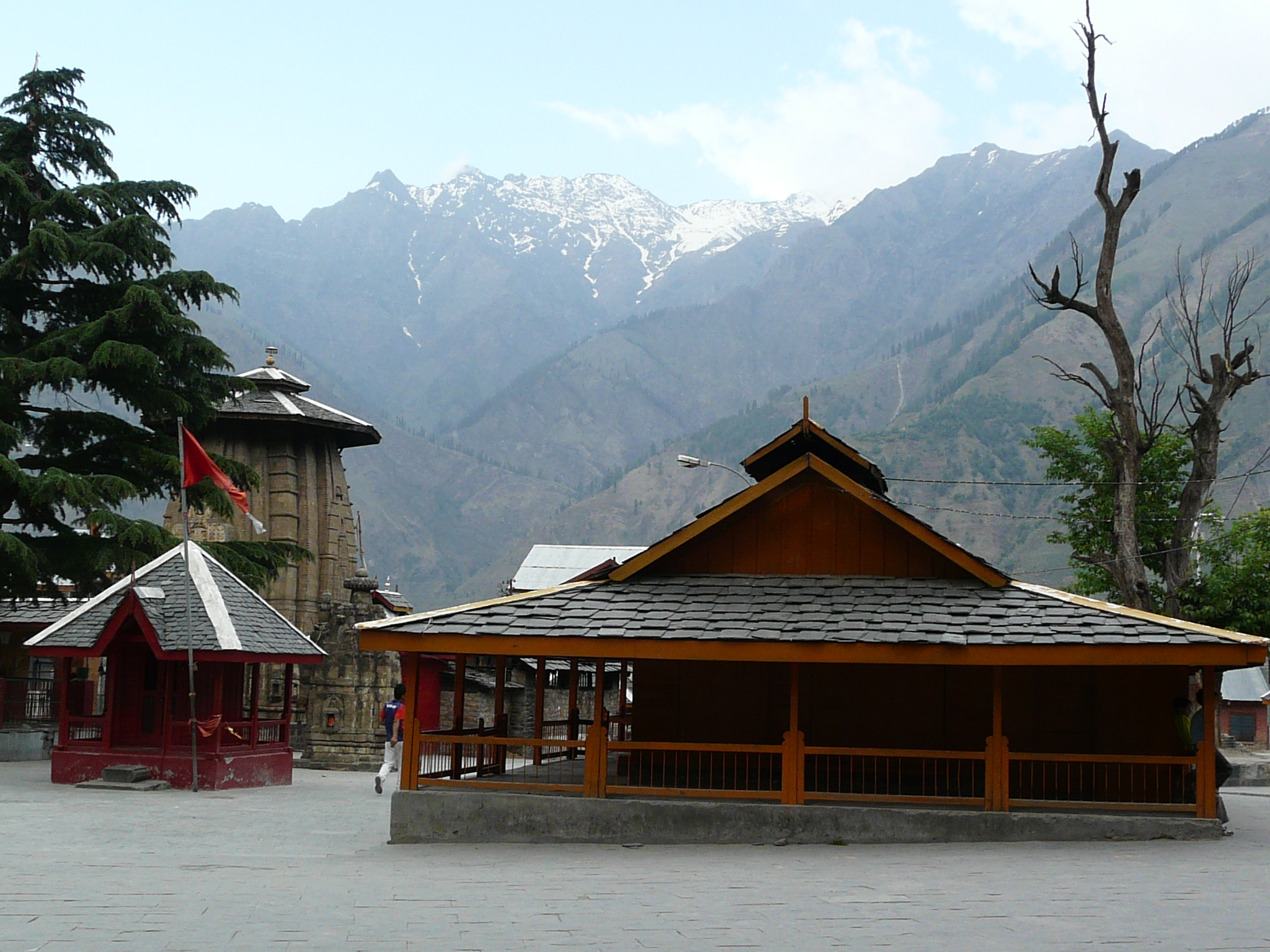
Narasimha Temple area

- Lakshana Devi Temple (Lakhna Devi/Bhadrakali): The temple of Lakshana Devi is the oldest temple at Chaurasi Temple, Bharmour. It is dedicated to Durga in her aspect of four-armed Mahishasuramardini, the slayer of the buffalo-demon Mahishasura. The carvings include themes of Shaivism and Vaishnavism.
- Manimahesh (Shiva) Temple: the Manimahesh Temple which stands in the centre of the Chaurasi Temple, is the main temple, enshrining a huge Shiva linga.
- Narsingh (Narasimha) Temple: Narasimha (Sanskrit: Narsingh) or Nrusimha, also spelled as Narasingh whose name literally translates from Sanskrit as "Man-lion".
- Lord Nandi Bull Temple: the life-size metal bull Nandi, locally known as Nandigan with the broken ear and tail, can be seen standing in a modern shed in front of Manimahesh temple.
- Dharmeshvar Mahadev (Dharamraj) Temple: Dharamraj, known as Dharmeshvar Mahadev, is in the northern corner of Chaurasi
- Ganesh or Ganpati Temple: the Ganesha temple is situated near the entrance of the Chaurasi Temple.
