= Gouki =

Gouki or Gōki or Goki may refer to:

== People ==
- Goki Eda (born 1981) an associate professor at the National University of Singapore
- Goki Kobayashi (小林 豪己; born 1998), Japanese professional boxer
- Goki Koshio (小塩 豪紀; born 1987), Japanese handball player
- Gōki Maeda (前田 公輝; born 1991), Japanese actor
- Goki Tajima (田嶋 剛希; born 1997), Japanese judoka
- Goki Tomozawa (友澤 剛気; born 1991), Japanese former football player
- Goki Uemura (1943–2025), Canadian judoka

== Characters ==
- Akuma (Street Fighter), a character in the Street Fighter video game series known as Gouki in the Japanese versions
- GingaBlue, a character in the television series Seijuu Sentai Gingaman whose real identity is Gouki
- Gouki (Beyblade), a character in Beyblade media
- Gouki, antagonist from the manga and anime series Yu Yu Hakusho
- Gouki Daimonji, a character in Cardfight!! Vanguard
- Kamen Rider Gouki, a character in the television series Kamen Rider Hibiki

== See also ==
- Goki calendar Japanese lunisolar calendar
- Gooki, Iran, a village in Fars Province, Iran
