= Taien calendar =

Chinese lunisolar calendar

The Dayan calendar (大衍暦, Dayan Li), also known as Daien or Daiyan or Taien calendar, was a Chinese lunisolar calendar. It was developed in China; in Japan, it was used from about 764 to 857.

== History ==
The calendar was created in China. It was first used in the 17th year of the Kaigen era during the Tang dynasty.

The Taien-reki system corrected errors in the Genka calendar and Gihō calendar which were used in Japan in the first half of the 8th century. It was the work of Yi Xing, who was a Chinese astronomer.

== See also ==
- Japanese calendar
- Sexagenary cycle
