= Buddhist tantric literature =

Group of Indian and Tibetan texts

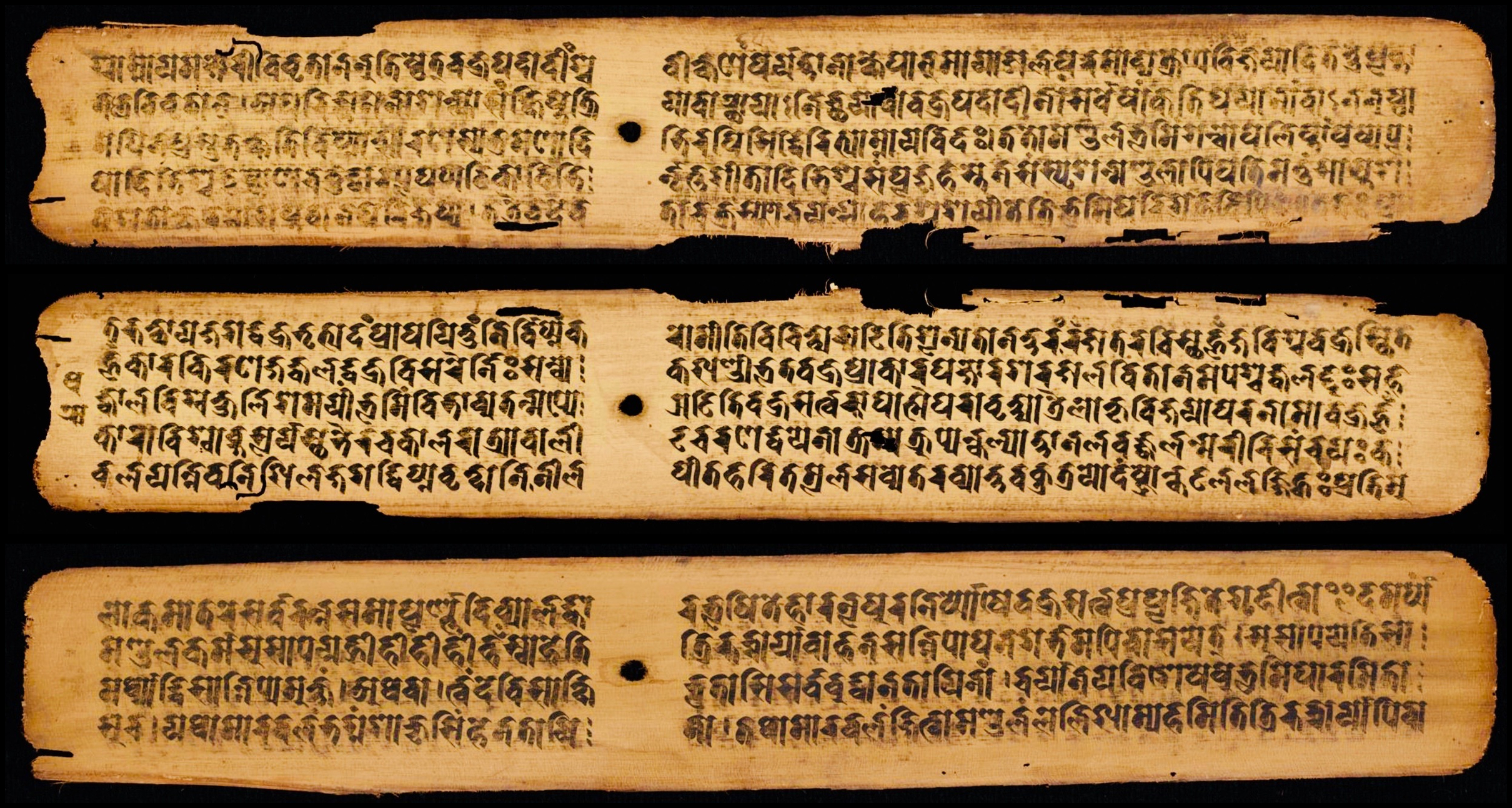
A manuscript of the Vajravali, a tantric commentary by Abhayakaragupta (manuscript c. 11th or 12th century CE, Sanskrit in Nepalaksara script).

Buddhist tantric literature refers to the vast and varied literature of the Vajrayāna (or Mantrayāna) Buddhist traditions. The earliest of these works are a genre of Indian Buddhist tantric scriptures, variously named Tantras, Sūtras and Kalpas, which were composed from the 7th century CE onwards. They are followed by later tantric commentaries (called pañjikās and ṭīkās), original compositions by Vajrayana authors (called prakaraṇas and upadeśas), sādhanas (practice texts), ritual manuals (kalpas or vidhis), collections of tantric songs (dohās) odes (stotra), or hymns, and other related works. Tantric Buddhist literature survives in various languages, including Sanskrit, Tibetan, and Chinese. Most Indian sources were composed in Sanskrit, but numerous tantric works were also composed in other languages like Tibetan and Chinese.

== Overview ==
=== History ===
Buddhist Tantric texts may have begun appearing during the Gupta Period (320–550 CE). However, the earliest known datable Buddhist Tantra is the Awakening of Mahāvairocana Tantra, which was mentioned and collected by the Chinese pilgrim Wu-xing (無行) c. 680 CE.

Wu-xing also reports that at the time he visited India (7th century), the Mantrayāna (“teaching about mantra”, Chinese: zhenyan jiaofa, 真言教法) was already very popular. Amoghavajra (704–774), a scholar translator who traveled to China, reports a canon of eighteen tantras during the 8th century.

Over time the number of texts increased with numerous Tantric scholars writing commentaries and practice manuals. Buddhist Tantric traditions draw on the Mahayana sutras, and older Buddhist esoteric practices like dhāraṇī recitation texts. Furthermore, earlier Buddhist traditions had maintained a collection of scriptures focused on magical practices, called the Vidyādhara Piṭaka (Wizardry Collection) which included various types of rituals and spells (vidyā). In the account of a Buddhist spell master by Yijing, he even mentions erotic practices associated with this collection.

Buddhist tantras were also influenced by non-buddhist traditions, including Śaiva and Śakta sources, the cults of local deities, and rites related to yakshas and nāgas. The Buddhist Yogini tantras contain the most extensive borrowing from Śaiva and Śakta sources. In some cases, whole passages have been copied. This process has been studied by Alexis Sanderson. Scholars like Phyllis Granoff have termed this extensive borrowing of non-buddhist forms "ritual eclecticism". Buddhist Tantric works continued to be produced in India until the 1500s.

Many early Buddhist Tantric texts, later termed “action Tantras” (kriyā tantra), are mostly collections of magical mantras or phrases for mostly worldly ends called mantrakalpas (mantra manuals) and they do not call themselves Tantras. Later Tantric texts from the eighth century onward (termed variously Yogatantra, Mahayoga, and Yoginī Tantras) advocated union with a deity (deity yoga), sacred sounds (mantras), techniques for manipulation of the subtle body and other secret methods with which to achieve swift Buddhahood. Some Tantras contain antinomian and transgressive practices such as ingesting alcohol and other forbidden substances as well as sexual rituals. Some of these later Buddhist Tantras (especially the Yoginītantras) are clearly influenced by Śaiva Vidyāpīṭha scriptures.

Buddhist Tantra quickly spread out of India into nearby countries like Tibet and Nepal in the eighth century, as well as to Southeast Asia and East Asia through overland and maritime trade routes. Buddhist Tantra arrived in China during the Tang dynasty (where it was known as Tangmi) and was brought to Japan by Kukai (774–835), where it is known as Shingon. Tantric texts were brought to Tibet in two historical periods, the eighth century and the 11th century (which are called the "early translations" and "second dissemination" texts). Buddhist tantra remains the main Buddhist tradition in Nepal, Mongolia and Tibet where it is known as Vajrayana.

=== Origin myths ===
Buddhist sources told various myths about the origin of the tantras. One origin myth states that the tantras were initially taught by the Buddha but were hidden away. Then they were rediscovered by Nāgārjuna in an iron stupa in south India. Other origin myths focus around a mythic king of Oḍiyāna named Indrabhūti, who received the tantras with the aid of Vajrapani.

Furthermore, as Gray writes, "there is another major genre of tantric Buddhist origin myths, which we might term “conversion myths” since they feature the founding figure, an awakened buddha, converting Śaiva Hindu deities to Buddhism". These myths were useful in explaining the many Hindu elements which were found in some Buddhist tantric texts. In one such myth told by Śubhakarasiṃha (善无畏, 637–735) and Yixing (一行, 683– 727), Vairocana Buddha turns himself into Mahākāla in order to swallow and subdue Shiva and the ḍākinīs who were killing and eating humans in order to obtain the essence in their hearts. After being subdued, these figures were said to have become Buddhist.

== Texts ==
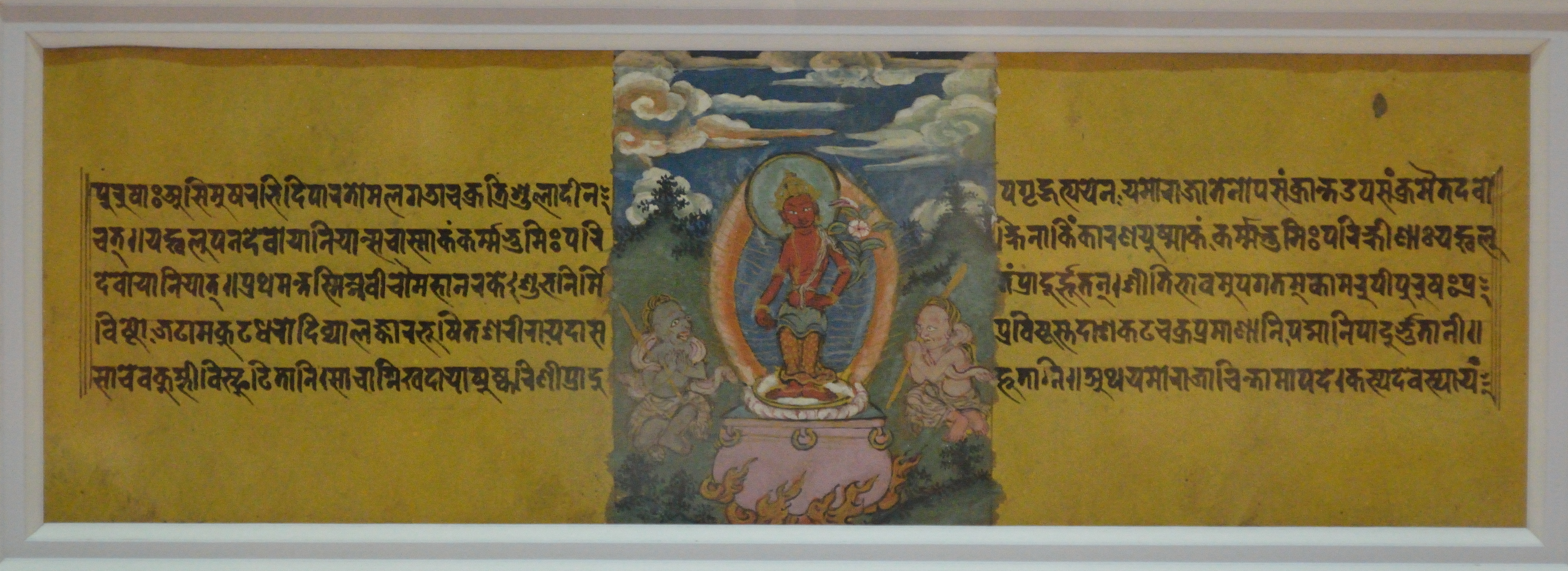
Kāraṇḍavyūha Sūtra manuscript (c. 14th century, Newari) with a miniature illustration of Avalokiteśvara

=== Classes of tantric texts ===
There are various ways to categorize and schematize the various tantric primary sources. The earliest Indian classification scheme is found in the work of the commentator Buddhaguhya (c. 700). He outlined just two types of tantras: outward oriented Kriya tantras (which contain much ritual directed as external objects like a Buddha statue) and the Yoga tantras which focus on inward contemplative practices in which the yogi visualizes themselves as the deity. The commentator Vilāsavajra meanwhile, sometimes added a third category: Carya, which was intermediate between Kriya and Yoga. In another text meanwhile, Vilāsavajra discusses a different third category: Upaya, which referred to more transgressive tantras that made use of sexual yoga.

The Classification of Tantras in Tibetan Buddhism differs by tradition. All traditions agree on three types: Kriyayoga, Caryayoga, and Yogatantra. In the "Ancient" (Nyingma) school, these three "outer tantras" are followed three further "inner tantras": Mahayoga, Anuyoga, and Atiyoga. In the "New Translation" (Sarma) schools, the "higher" classes are called "supreme yoga tantras" (anuttarayogatantra). The Sarma classification systems was constructed by Indo-Tibetan scholastics and date to the mid-12th century based on Indian works.

A fourfold schema can be found in the work of the Indian scholar Śraddhākaravarman, who writes of "four doors" to the Vajratana: Kriyatantra, Caryatantra, Yoga- tantra, and Mahayogatantra. He also mentions a further sub-class of Mahayoga, Niruttarayoga, which refers to Mahayoga tantras with mandalas populated by female deities, i.e., the Yogini tantras. Ratnākaraśānti's (11th century) schema contains the same four latter classes, but adds Niruttarayoga as its own fifth category. Kanha's Yogaratnamala meanwhile, also has four: Kriya, Carya, Yoga, Niruttarayoga. Thus, the Tibetan schema is based on these later Indic classifications schemes.

In Tibetan traditions, the most important tantras are those of the "highest yoga tantra", "Mahayoga" or Atiyoga" classification. There are also various other classes of tantric works, such as hagiographies of great masters (namtars), tantric verse works, songs, meditation manuals, and instructional texts (upadesha). The Nyingma school also has a special category of scripture which were discovered or revealed in Tibet, known as Terma. Some of these are classified as "tantras" but were composed in Tibetan by Tibetans.

Meanwhile, in Shingon Buddhism and Chinese Esoteric Buddhism, these classifications are not used. These traditions mainly rely on the Mahāvairocana Sūtra (Chinese: 大日經; pinyin: Dàrì jīng; rōmaji: Dainichi kyō), the Vajraśekhara Sūtra (Chinese: 金剛頂經; pinyin: Jīngāngdǐng jīng; rōmaji: Kongōchō kyō), and the Susiddhikara Sūtra (Chinese: 蘇悉地羯羅經; pinyin: Sūxīdìjiéluó jīng; rōmaji: Soshitsujikara kyō).

While traditional schemas classify tantric texts based on whether it is focused on "kriya" (ritual action) or "yoga" (contemplative practice), this does not mean that ritual topics are absent in the yoga tantras, which themselves contain extensive sections on ritual. Likewise, texts labeled "kriya tantra" also contain teachings on yoga.

Many tantric Buddhist texts have titles other than "Tantra", including sutra, kalpa, rajñi, stotra, and doha. The Major Buddhist Tantras also accumulated secondary literature, such as 'Explanatory Tantras' (vyākhyātantra), commentaries (pañjikās, ṭīkās etc.) and sadhana literature which outline specific tantric ritual practices and meditations.

Dhāraṇīs are an earlier class of Buddhist texts which are not specifically "tantric" or "Vajrayanist" in nature. They may be found in classic Mahayana sutras like the Lotus Sutra, and thus pre-date the development of Buddhist tantra. Dhāraṇī practices and texts were part of mainstream Mahayana Buddhism well before the rise of Vajrayana, and as such, are not "tantric" works nor specifically connected to esoteric or Mantrayāna Buddhism. However, some tantras and tantric works do make use of dhāraṇīs in a broader tantric context and later canonical collections included numerous dhāraṇīs into the tantra classification. Indeed, some scholars like Koichi Shinohara argue that the Buddhist tantric literature grew out of the earlier Mahayana dhāraṇī texts through a process of gradual expansion and the incorporation of new ritual elements (such as mandalas and visualization practices).

There are between 1500 and 2000 surviving Indian Buddhist Tantric texts in Sanskrit, and over 2000 more Tantras solely survive in translation (mostly Tibetan or Chinese). In the Tibetan canons, there are 450 Tantras in the Kanjur collection and 2400 in the Tengyur.

=== Indian tantras ===
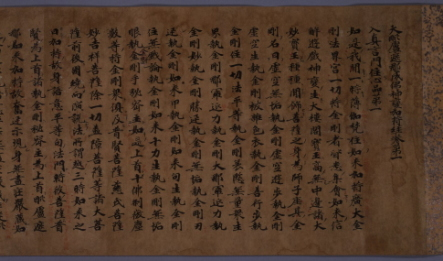
Chinese translation of the Vairocanābhisaṃbodhi (Awakening of Vairocana)

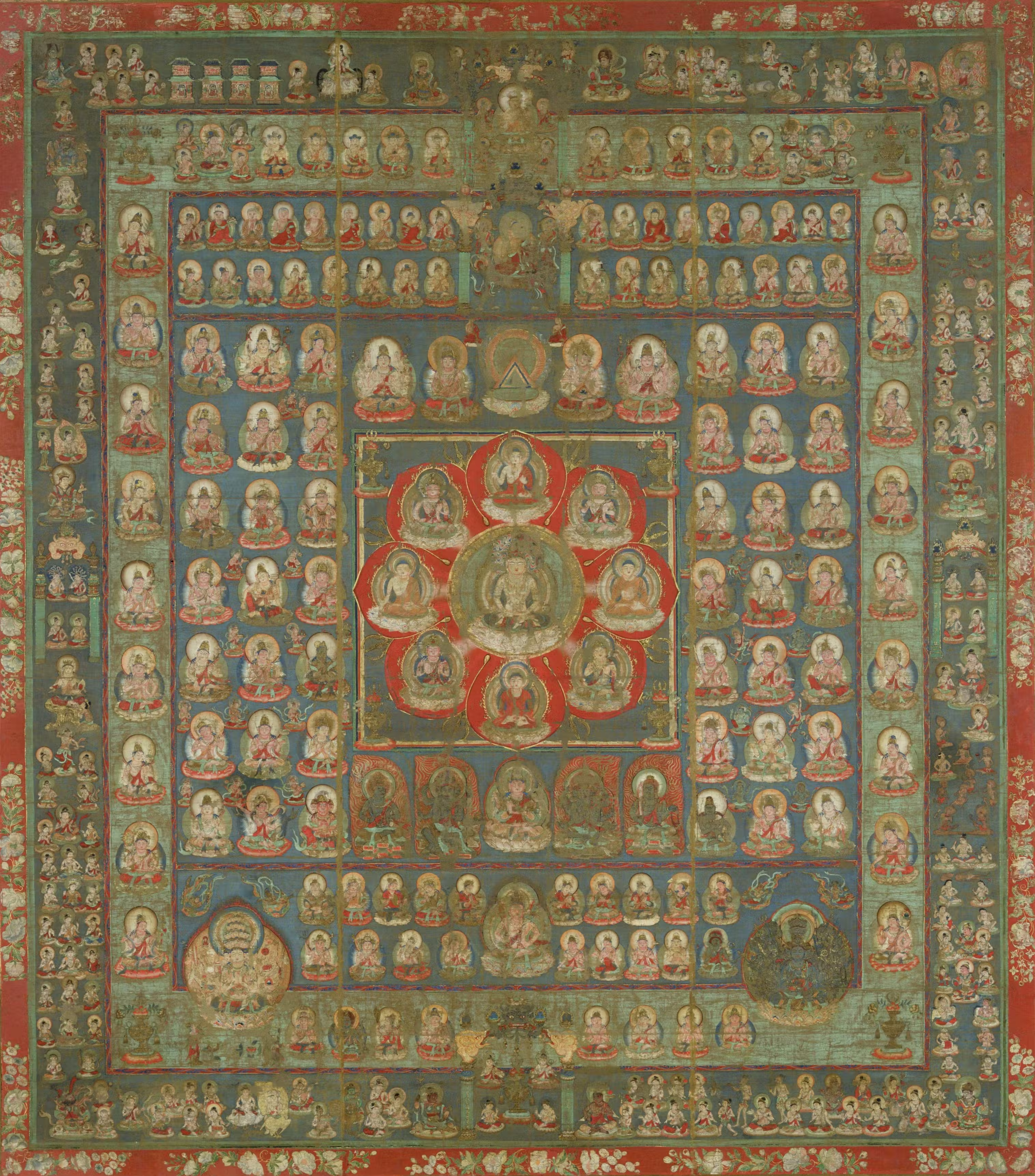
The Garbhadhātu maṇḍala, derived from the teachings of the Mahāvairocana Tantra. Buddha Vairocana is located in the center.

The most important texts of the Vajrayana Buddhist traditions are the "tantras". The term tantra has many meanings, but one of the most common meaning is simply a specific type of divinely revealed text or scripture. In the Buddhist context, tantras were considered to be the words of a Buddha or bodhisattva (buddhavacana).

Unlike Mahayana sutras, tantras are quite technical, outlining the details of rituals, such as how to construct a mandala. They also contain unique tantric terminology and "coded language" (sandhyā-bhāṣa), which is metaphorical and secretive. They often omit important details and misdirect the reader, thus maintaining secrecy and requiring further commentary to be properly understood. Their original language was Sanskrit, but not classical Sanskrit (Pāṇinean) per se, since tantras often include different word forms or grammar associated with regional Middle-Indic languages, like Apabraṃśa. Apabraṃśa is also often used for tantric songs and poems.

Tantric scriptures were also considered to be secret by tantric Buddhist communities, and would only be revealed to disciples which had gone through the necessary initiations. Buddhist tantras promise both the ability to attain worldly magical powers (laukikasiddhi) and the surepeme achievement (lokottarasiddhi) of Buddhahood in one lifetime.

Some of the unique themes and ideas found in the Buddhist Tantras is the revaluation of the body and its use in attaining great bliss (mahasukha), a revaluation of the role of women, yoginīs (female yogis), and female deities. The tantras also contain a revaluation of supposedly negative mental states (like desire and anger) and antinominan behavior (like drinking alcohol, eating meat, living in charnel grounds etc.), which can be used in the service of liberation. This is manifested in the promotion of tantric fierce deities. As the Hevajra Tantra says "the world is bound by passion, also by passion it is released". Some tantras, especially those of the Yoginītantra genre, have many erotic and sexual elements. The Guhyasamāja tantra, Hevajra, Caṇḍamahāroṣaṇa, Saṃvarodaya, and Sampuṭikātantrarāja, all open as follows: “Thus I have heard: at one time the Bhagavān resided in the vulvas of the women who are the vajras of the body, speech and mind of all the Tathāgatas” (evaṃ mayā śrutam ekasmin samaye bhagavān sarvva-tathāgata-kāya-vāk-citta-vajra-yonī-bhāgeṣu vijahāra).

Regarding their philosophical view, the Buddhist tantras generally follow the view of the Mahāyāna sutras, especially the theories of emptiness, buddha-nature, and luminosity. According to the tantras, to reach Buddhahood, one needs to recognize the true nature of one's mind, the buddha-nature, which is a non-dual empty luminosity (prabhāsvara) which is pure, blissful, and free of all concepts. The true nature is the same in Buddhas and sentient beings, and is thus the ultimate "continuum" (tantra). The Guhyasamāja Tantra describes the ultimate nature of mind thus: "Devoid of all existents, free of the aggregates, the sense objects and media, and subject and object, one’s mind, being identical to the selflessness of dharmas, is originally unarisen and has emptiness as its nature." This ultimate nature can be accessed through skillful means, especially the contemplative tantric techniques taught in the tantras.

When it comes to practical content, tantras contain numerous explanations of yogic practice and ritual actions. Common topics related to spiritual practice include: how to make mandalas, how to perform ritual initiations (abhisheka), explanation of mantras, fire ritual (homa), special observances (carya), descriptions of tantric feasts (ganacakra), descriptions of tantric deities, deity yoga, subtle body based practices (of the perfection stage) and teachings on the yoginis.

==== List of Indian Buddhist tantras ====
The following is a list of some major Buddhist Tantras from the classic period of Indian Buddhist tantrism as well as other tantric scriptures like sutras and dharanis. The list is organized according to the traditional classification used in the Tibetan canon.

===== Action tantra (Kriyātantra) =====
The scriptures in this category are considered to emphasize ritual action (kriyā), preparation of ritual spaces, textual recitation / chanting (of mantras, dhāraṇīs, vidyās, and other texts), and the external worship of deities. Key Action tantras include:

- The Heart Sutra
- The Dhāraṇī of Vaiḍūryaprabha
- Mañjuśrīmūlakalpa (Root Manual of the Rites of Mañjuśrī), an early mantra-kalpa (compendium of mantras, compiled in stages beginning in the seventh century)
- Suvarṇaprabhāsottamasūtra (Golden Light Sutra)
- Mahāmāyūrī-vidyārājñī (The Queen of Incantations: The Great Peahen), one of the five texts in the Pañcarakṣā scriptural collection
- The Supreme Accomplishment of Invincible Averting, Sitātapatrā Born from the Uṣṇīṣa of the Tathāgata, which contains a protective spell (vidyā)
- Mañjuśrīnāmāṣṭaśatakam (The Hundred and Eight Names of Mañjuśrī)
- The Bhūtaḍāmara Tantra (c. 7th century), an esoteric manual on magic and exorcism focused on Vajrapāṇi as Bhūtaḍāmara (“Tamer of Spirits”)
- The Aparimitāyurjñāna Sūtra
- Amoghapāśa-kalparāja-sūtra (The Noble Sovereign Ritual of Amoghapāśa), the source of the mantra of light
- The Dhāraṇī of the Eleven Faced Avalokiteśvara (Avalokiteśvaraikādaśamukhadhāraṇī)
- Nīlakaṇṭhadhāraṇī
- Tārā Tantra, or Sarvatathāgatamātṛtārāviśvakarmabhavanāmatantra (Tantra Which is the Source for All the Functions of Tārā, Mother of All the Tathagatas)
- Tārādevīnāmāṣṭaśataka (The Hundred and Eight Names of Tārā)
- Subāhuparipṛcchātantra (The Tantra of Subāhu’s Questions) (mid-sixth to mid-seventh centuries)

===== Conduct tantras (Caryātantra) =====
Scriptures in this category are seen as containing equal ritual and meditation elements. They mostly focus on Vairocana, Vajrapāṇi and Acala. Some key scriptures:

- Vairocanābhisaṃbodhi Tantra (Awakening of Great Vairocana, terminus ante quem c. 7th century)
- Acalamahākrodharājasya sarvatathāgatasya balāparimitavīravinayasvākhyāto nāma kalpaḥ (The Practice Described as the Taming of the Great Wrathful King Acala)
- Vajrapāṇyabhiṣeka-mahātantra (Vajrapāṇi Empowerment Tantra, c. early 7th century)
- Bhagavannīlāmbaradharavajrapāṇi Tantra (The Tantra of the Blue-Clad Blessed Vajrapāṇi)

===== Yoga tantras =====
These tantras focus on meditation, i.e. yoga. However, unlike the Anuttara- or Mahāyoga tantras, these scriptures do not contain much wrathful, antinomian or sexual elements, and instead focus on themes of ritual purity, mandalic buddhafields, and "peaceful" deities and Buddhas like Vairocana Buddha and Vajrasattva. Mantras, mandalas and mudras are key elements of the practices taught in these tantras. Some key Yoga tantras are:

- Sarvatathāgatatattvasaṃgraha sutra (Compendium of the Reality of All Tathāgatas, c. 7th century)
- Vajraśekhara Sūtra (Adamantine Peak, 8th century), a collection of tantric texts.
- Susiddhikāra-sūtra (mid-sixth to mid-seventh centuries)
- Sarvarahasya-nāma-tantrarāja (Universal Secret Sovereign Tantra, c. 8th century)
- Sarvadurgatipariśodhanatejorāja (The Tantra Purifying Evil Destinies, terminus ante quem c. 8th century)
- Prajñāpāramitānayaśatapañcaśatikā (The Principles of the Perfection of Wisdom in 150 Lines, c. 7-8th century)

===== Anuttarayoga, Mahāyoga or Yoginī Tantras =====
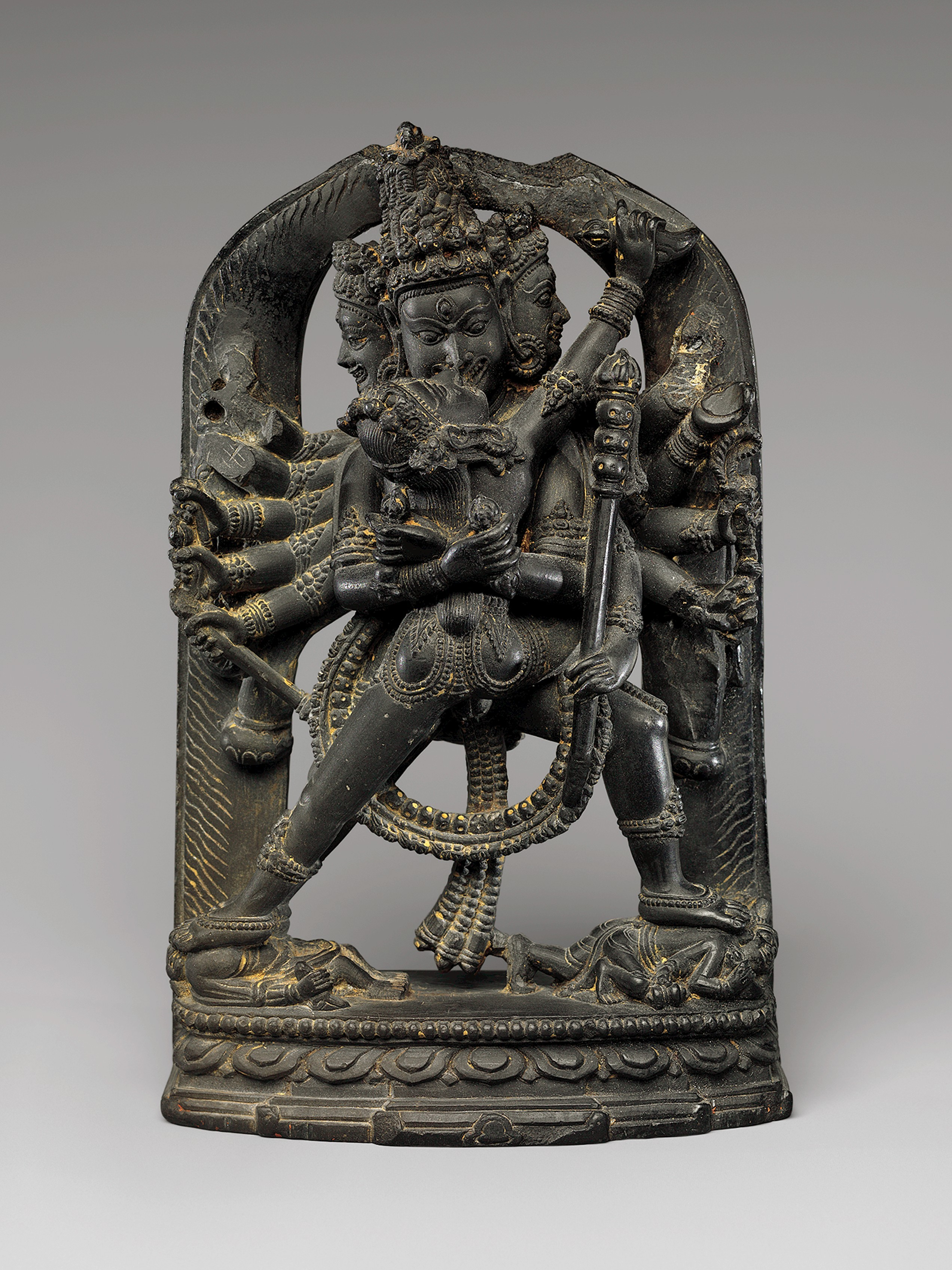
Statue of Saṃvara in union with his consort Vajravarahi (c. 12th century, Bengal). The theme of fierce deities in sexual union is commonly found in the anuttarayoga tantras.

The fourth category of tantric scriptures is considered to be the highest and most powerful class of tantra in Tibetan Buddhism. This view is not shared by other Buddhist Mantrayāna traditions like Shingon. This class of texts is called by different names, including Anuttarayogatantra, Mahāyoga, Niruttarayoga, and Yoginī Tantras. They are also often further divided into different sub-categories, like "father", "mother" and "non-dual" tantras. Japanese scholars like Tsukamoto further classify these into different families, like Akṣobhya-kula, Vairocana-kula, Heruka-kula, Vajra-sūrya-kula, Padmanarteśvara-kula, Paramāśva-kula, and Vajradhara-kula.

These tantras tend to contain more transgressive elements, including sexual themes, sexual yoga (karmamudrā), wrathful deities, charnel ground imagery, the ingestion of taboo substances (blood, meat, alcohol, sexual fluids), tantric feasts, as well as numerous Shaiva and Shakta influences. The deities in these scriptures often (but not always) appear as fierce herukas and erotic dakinis. Some key tantras in this category include:

- Sarvabuddhasamāyoga-dākinījālasaṃvara Tantra (Ḍākinīs’ Network That Unites All Buddhas, early 8th century), one of the first Yoginī Tantras, introduces the practice of gaṇacakra. It has been seen by modern scholars as a "transitional scripture" and a “proto-yoginītantra”.
- Mañjuśrī-nāmasamgīti (Chanting the names of Mañjuśrī, c. 8th century)
- Guhyasamāja Tantra (The Esoteric Community Tantra, c. 8th century)
- Advayasamatāvijaya (Victory of Nondual Equality, c. 8th century), part of the Guhyasamāja tradition.
- The six explanatory tantras (vyākhyātantra) of the Guhyasamāja tradition: The Sandhyāvyākaraṇa (Explanation of the Intention); the Caturdevīparipṛcchā (The Four Goddessesʼ Inquiry); the Vajramālā (Vajra Rosary); the Jñānavajrasamuccaya (Gnosis Vajra Compendium) and its longer version; and the Vajrahṛdayālaṃkāra (Vajra Heart Adornment).
- Catuṣpīṭha (Four Chapters, c. 9th century), the first tantra to teach utkrāntiyoga, or yogic suicide.
- Māyājāla Tantra (The Net of Magical Illusion)
- Guhyagarbha Tantra (The Secret Womb Tantra), the key Mahayoga tantra in the Nyingma tradition
- Cakrasaṃvara Tantra (Supreme Bliss of the Wheels Tantra, c. 8th to 9th century), also called Herukābhidhāna (Discourse of Heruka) or Laghusaṃvara (Small Saṃvara). This tantra has been shown to contain much content borrowed from Śaiva Vidyāpīṭha tantras.
- Other tantras in the Cakrasaṃvara cycle: Herukābhyudaya (Realization of Heruka); Abhidhānottara (The Continuation of the Abhidhāna or Discourse); Caturyoginīsampuṭa (The Union of the Four Yoginīs); Yoginīsaṃcāra (Yoginīsʼ Rotation); Vajraḍāka (Vajraḍāka); and Vārāhyabhyudaya (Realization of Vārāhī).
- Tantras of the last historical phase of the Cakrasaṃvara cycle: The Saṃvarodaya (Emergence of the Supreme Bliss); the Ḍākārṇava (Ocean of Ḍākas); the Vārāhīkalpa (Ritual Practice of Vārāhī); and the Yoginījāla (Net of Yoginīs).
- Mahāmāyā Tantra
- Hevajra Tantra (c. 9th century), an influential tantra which introduced key tantric teachings like the innate (sahaja), the fourfold joy (caturānanda), the subtle body system with four cakras and the three channels (avadhūtī, lalanā, and rasanā), and the inner fire (Caṇḍālī).
- Ḍākinīvajrapañjara (Ḍākinī Vajra Cage), an important tantra in the Hevajra cycle of scriptures.
- Sampuṭodbhava (Emergence from the Union) and the Sampuṭatilaka (Ornament of the Emergence from the Union), part of the Hevajra cycle.
- Other texts of the Hevajra cycle: The Mahāmudrātilaka (Great Seal Ornament); the Jñānagarbha (Womb of Gnosis); the Jñānatilaka (Ornament of Gnosis); and the Tattvapradīpa (Light of Truth).
- Buddhakapāla (Skull of Buddha, c. 9-10th century).
- Namastāraikaviṃśatistotra (Praise to Tārā with Twenty-One Verses of Homage)
- Vajramrta Tantra (Adamantine Nectar, c. 9th century).
- Jñānatilakayoginī Tantra (The Tilaka of Gnosis, a Yoginī Tantra)
- Vajrapãṇyabhiṣeka Tantra
- Kālacakra Tantra (Wheel of Time, c. 11th century).
- Caṇḍamahāroṣaṇa Tantra (Fiery Great Wrathful One, c. 10-11th century Nepal).
- Sampuṭa Tantra (Kiss Tantra)
- Śrīsaṃvarakhasama Tantra (Glorious Sky-like Great Bliss Tantra)
- Vajraḍāka Tantra
- Vārāhyabhibodhana Tantra (Awakening of Varahi)
- Vajrabhairavavidāraṇa Tantra (The Tantra of Vajrabhairava's Destruction)
- Āryatārākurukullākalpa (The Practice Manual of Noble Tārā Kurukullā)
- Mahākāla Tantra
- Tārāyogini Tantra
- Kṛṣnayamāri Tantra
- Raktayamāri Tantra
- Great Vajrabhairava Tantra
- Ekajaṭa Tantra
- Vajrayogini Tantra

=== Other Indian tantric texts ===
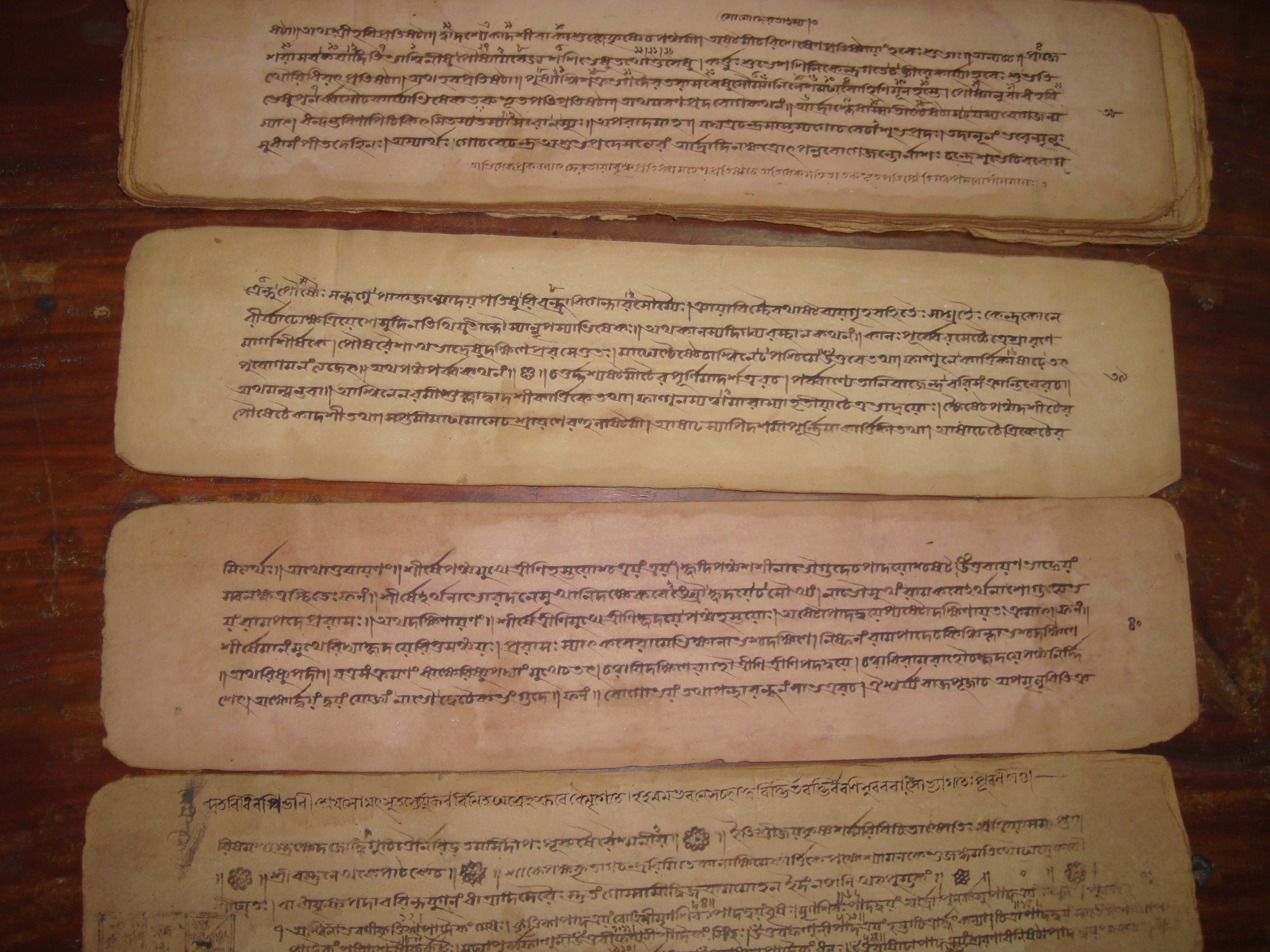
Caryapāda manuscript preserved in the library of Rajshahi College

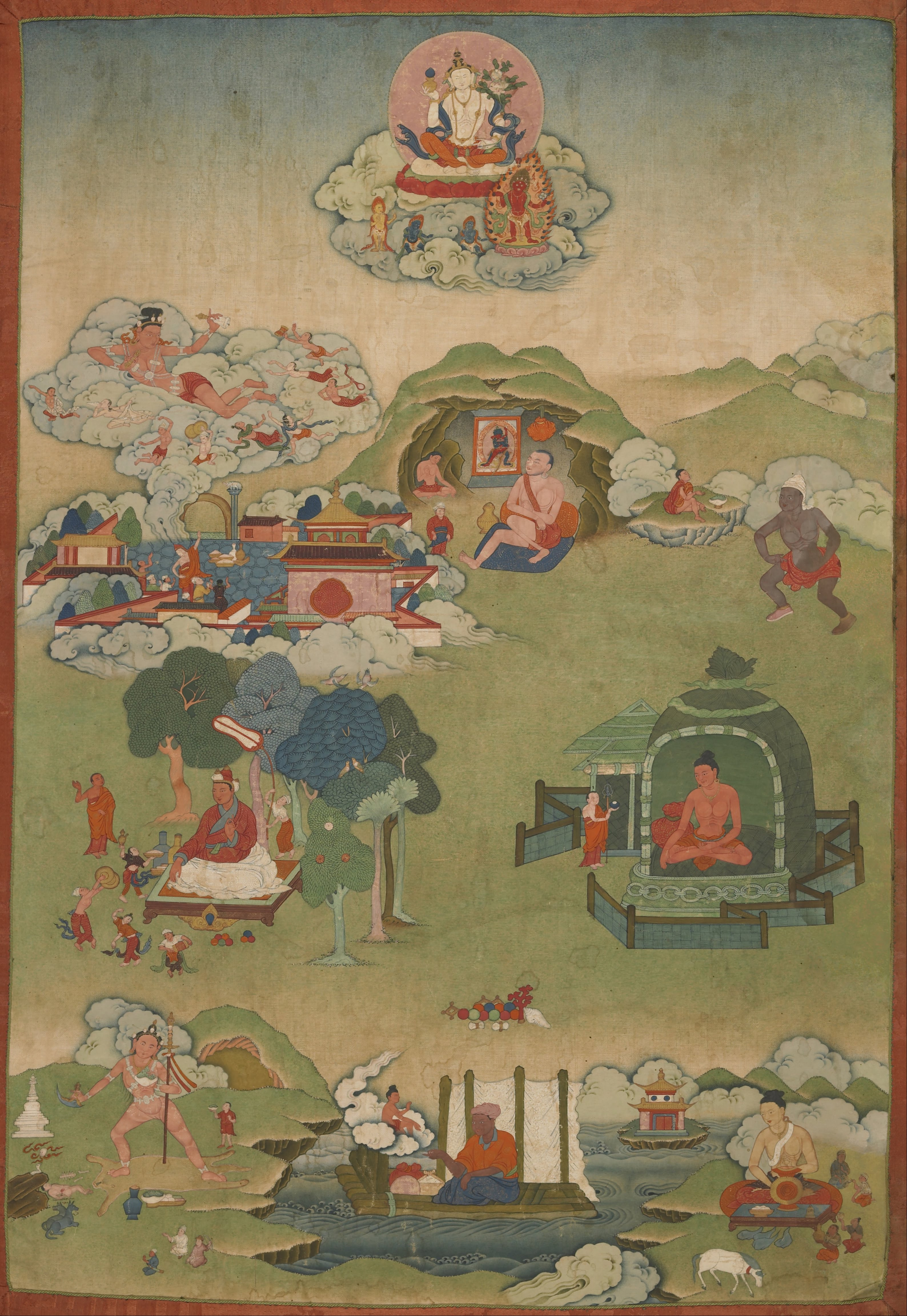
Eight Mahasiddhas with the bodhisattva Samantabhadra (top); 1st row (l->r): Darikapa, Putalipa, Upanaha; 2nd row: Kokilipa and Anangapa; 3rd row: Lakshmikara; Samudra; Vyalipa.

There are various other types of tantric Buddhist texts composed in India. One class of tantric text that are not always considered tantras but have tantric elements in them are several late Prajñāpāramitā sutras which have numerous tantric or Mantrayāna elements. These include: the Adhyardhaśatikā Prajñāpāramitā Sūtra (150 lines), the Heart Sutra (Prajñāpāramitāhṛdaya), the Ekaślokikā prajñāpāramitā, Svalpākṣarā Prajñāpāramitā, Kauśikā Prajñāpāramitā, Saptaślokikā Prajñāpāramitā, the *Prajñāpāramitānāmāṣṭaśataka and the Candragarbha Prajñāpāramitā.

Other "tantric" sutras include the Kāraṇḍavyūha Sūtra, the source of the famous Mani mantra, and the Śūraṅgama Sūtra, which is included in the Chinese Tripitaka's Esoteric Sutra category. The Śūraṅgama text contains indic materials, but may have been compiled or heavily edited in China.

Another class of tantric texts are verses, songs and other original compositions by tantric sages known as mahasiddhas ("greatly accomplished ones"). Their tantric songs, variously called dohā (rhyming couplets), caryāgīti (songs of realization), and vajragīti, were often grouped together into collections, like the proto-Bengali Caryapāda and Saraha's Dohakośa. There are various works on these tantric sages. Sāṅkrtyāyana lists the following important siddhas: Saraha, (Nāgārjuna), (Sabarapa), Luīpa, Dārikāpa, (Vajra-ghaṇṭāpa), Kūrmapā, Jālandharapā, (Kaṃha(pā) Caryapā), Guhyapā (Vijayapa), Tilopa, Naropa. There are longer lists which contain eighty four mahasiddhas in works such as Abhayadatta Śrī's History of the Eighty-four Mahasiddhas (Caturasitisiddha pravrtti).

Another class of verse tantric works are hymns (stotras) to specific deities.

Yet another class of texts are ritual manuals and collections of rites or sādhanas (practices). One example of these kinds of collections is the Sādhanamālā (Garland of Sādhanas) which contains numerous sādhanas composed by various Indian tantric masters. Another example is Abhayakaragupta's Niṣpannayogāvalī, which contains details on 26 different mandalas.

=== Indian Tantric authors ===
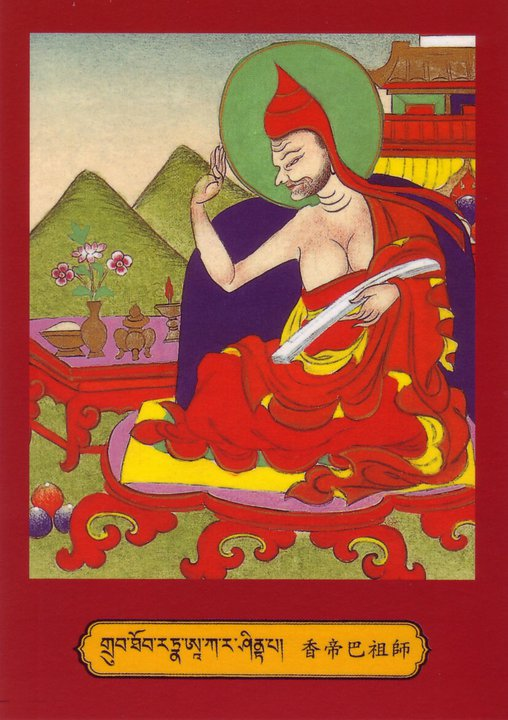
A Tibetan illustration of Ratnākaraśānti (c. 11th century), an influential Buddhist philosopher and tantric scholar practitioner who studied at Vikramashila, a major center of tantric studies.

As Buddhist Tantra became more widely practiced in the middle of the seventh century, pandits (scholars) at mainstream Buddhist institutions like Nālandā, Vikramaśilā and Somapura began to write treatises, commentaries and other works on Vajrayana Buddhism. Other tantric works were written by lay yogis, yoginis, and mahasiddhas which were outside of the traditional monastic institutions. Another important site for the development of Buddhist tantric literature was Kashmir, a major center for tantric practice (both Buddhist and non-buddhist, such as Trika Saiva Tantra).

Benoytosh Bhattacharyya notes that there are two main chronological lists of prominent Indian Tantric authors, the first from Tāranātha's works (c. 1575–1634) and the second from Kazi Dawasamdup's introduction to the Cakrasaṃvara Tantra.

Tāranātha's list:

1. Padmavajra (c.693), author of the Guhyasiddhi
2. Anangavajra (c.705), author of the Prajñopāyaviniścayasiddhi
3. Indrabhūti (c.717), author of the Jñānasiddhi
4. Bhagavatī Lakṣmī (c.729) or Lakṣmīṃkarā, female author of the Advayasiddhi and the *Sahaja-siddhipaddhati
5. Lilavajra (c.741)
6. Darikapa (c.753)
7. Sahajayoginī (c.765)
8. Ḍombi Heruka or Ḍombipa (c.777)

Kazi Dawasamdup's list:

1. Saraha, also known as Rāhula (c. 633), a famous author of esoteric dohas
2. Ārya Nāgārjuna, a tantric commentator to the Guhyasamāja who authored the Pañcakrama. Not to be confused with the Madhyamaka philosopher of the same name.
3. Śabaripa (c.657)
4. Luipa (c.669)
5. Vajraghaṇṭā (c.681)
6. Kācchapa (c.693)
7. Jalandharipa (c.705), wrote a commentary to the Hevajra tantra
8. Kr̥ṣṇācārya (c.717)
9. Guhya (c.729)
10. Vijayapa (c.741)
11. Tilopa
12. Nāropā

Other important Indian tantric authors include:

- Buddhaguhya, wrote a commentary on the Mahavairocana Tantra
- Mañjuśrīmitra (8th century), an important author on non-conceptual meditation which is a precursor to later Tibetan Dzogchen texts. He wrote The Transcendent State of Bodhicitta (Tibetan: Byang chub sems bsgom pa), considered a key work of early Dzogchen Semde literature.
- Vimalamitra (8th century), wrote commentaries on the Guhyagarbha tantra and is also associated with translations of Dzogchen Semde texts
- Padmasambhava (8th century), wrote a commentary on the 13th chapter of the Guhyagarbha tantra, a work on Mahayoga, and Garland of Views, a doxographic work.
- Śāntarakṣita (725–788), whose authorship of the Tantric work Tattvasiddhi is attributed by various authors, but this is debated by scholars such as Ernst Steinkellner.
- Vilāsavajra, 8-9th century author of the Namamantrarthavalokini, a commentary on the Mañjuśrīnāmasamgīti.
- Jñānapāda, also known as Buddhajñāna, Buddhaśrījñāna, *Buddhajñānapāda, *Śrījñānapāda (fl. c. 770–820 CE). He was a very influential tantric author and a commentator to the Guhyasamājatantra. A key work of his is the Mukhāgama, a collection of his teachings and the Ātmasādhanāvatāra, a major tantric treatise.
- Virūpa, a famed yogin and author. He is likely the author of the Amṛtasiddhi, the source of the earliest system of Hatha yoga
- Āryadeva, author of the Lamp that Integrates the Practices (Caryāmelāpakapradīpa), a commentary on the Guhyasamāja Tantra. Not to be confused with the Madhyamaka philosopher of the same name.
- Candrakīrti, 9th century author of the Pradīpodyotananāmaṭīkā, an extensive Guhyasamāja commentary. He is not to be confused with the Madhyamaka philosopher of the same name.
- Sakyamitra, commentator on the Guhyasamāja Tantra
- Nagabodhi, commentator on the Guhyasamāja Tantra
- Ānandagarbha, author of the Vajrajvālodayā, a sādhanā manual
- Bhavyakīrti, 10th century author of a commentary on the Cakrasaṃvara Tantra, the Śrīcakrasamvarapañjikā-śūramanojñā-nāma.
- Sraddhakaravarman, commentator on the Guhyasamāja
- Devapāla, a 9th emperor of the Palas, and author of Śrīcakrasaṃvara-sādhana-sarva-śula-nāma-ṭīkā, a large Cakrasamvāratantra commentary.
- Bhavabhaṭṭa, 10th century author of the Śrīcakrasaṁvarapañjikā, a Cakrasamvāratantra commentary
- Jayabhadra, Cakrasamvāratantra commentator
- Durjayacandra, Cakrasamvāratantra commentator
- Vajrapani, Cakrasamvāratantra commentator
- Tathagataraksita, Cakrasamvāratantra commentator
- Bhavabadra, Cakrasamvāratantra commentator
- Viravajra, Cakrasamvāratantra commentator
- Manibhadra, Cakrasamvāratantra commentator
- Śraddhākaravarman, a Guhyasamāja commentator and author of Yogānattaratantrārthāvatārasaṃgraha
- Prasantajnana, Guhyasamāja commentator
- Vimalagupta, Guhyasamāja commentator
- Cilupa, Guhyasamāja commentator
- Vajrahasa, Guhyasamāja commentator
- Kāṇha, author of the Yogaratnamālā on the Hevajra Tantra.
- Bhadrapāda, author of the Śrīhevajravyākhyākhyāvivaraṇa, on the Hevajra Tantra
- Vajragarbha, author of the Ṣaṭsāhasrikā-Hevajra-ṭīkā
- Ratnakīrti, 11th century
- Ratnākaraśānti (i.e. Santipa), wrote the Muktāvalī, a commentary on the Hevajra and the Hevajrasādhanopāyikā
- Vāgīśvarakīrti, a well known tantric author who was colleague of Ratnākaraśānti at Vikramaśīla
- Maitrīpāda (c. 1007–1085), a.k.a. Advayavajra, author of several influential works on meditation
- Pundarika (11th-century), a commentator on the Kalachakra who wrote the Vimalaprabhā (Stainless Light)
- Sucandra, wrote a Kalachakra commentary in sixty thousand stanzas
- Hevajratantra-Yogaratnamālā, a Hevajra commentary by Kr̥ṣṇavajrapāda (11th century)
- Abhayākaragupta, 11th-early 12th century CE, wrote numerous tantric texts like Vajrāvali and Kālacakrāvatāra.
- Dīpaṅkaraśrījñāna, also known as Atīśa (c. 982–1054), who was influential in the transmission of Buddhism to Tibet. He most famous for his Bodhipathapradīpa.

=== East Asian tantric literature ===
Tantric Buddhism arrived in China during the Tang dynasty, when numerous esoteric works were translated into Chinese. During this era, three great tantric masters (vajracharyas) came from India to China: Śubhakarasiṃha (637–735), Vajrabodhi (671–741) and Amoghavajra (705–774). They worked on translations of classic tantras like the Vairocanābhisaṃbodhi Sūtra and the Vajrasekhara Sutra, and also composed practice manuals and commentaries in Chinese. They are considered to be the founding patriarchs of Chinese Esoteric Buddhism and their writings are central to the East Asian Mantrayāna traditions.

The tradition was passed on from later figures like Huiguo to various Japanese Buddhist disciples who founded the Mantrayāna lineages in Japan. One important figure is Kūkai (774–835), the founder of the Shingon school. Kūkai's numerous works and commentaries on tantric practice are foundational texts for the Shingon tradition. One of the most important works of Kūkai is his magnum opus, the Jūjū shinron (Treatise on Ten Levels of Mind), along with its summary, the Hizō hōyaku (Precious Key to the Secret Treasury).

The Tendai school meanwhile also maintains its own collection of Mantrayāna texts, commentaries and practice manuals, composed by traditional figures like Saicho, Ennin and Annen. The original works of Annen (841–889?) are particularly important for Tendai esotericism, especially his Shingonshū kyōjigi (On the Meaning of Teachings and Times in Esoteric Buddhism) and the Taizōkongō bodaishingi ryaku mondōshō (Abbreviated Discussion on the Meaning of Bodhicitta according to the Garbha and Vajra realms)

=== Tibetan tantric literature ===
As Vajrayana Buddhism developed in Tibet (beginning in the 8th century CE), Tibetan Buddhists also began to compose Vajrayana scriptures, commentaries and other works. Eventually, a vast literature of original Tibetan Vajrayana compositions developed. There are many types of indigenous Tibetan tantric literature. Each school of Tibetan Buddhism maintains their own collections of texts composed by the lineage masters of their tradition and considered to be canonical by their sect. These include commentarial works, original treatises, meditation manuals, sadhanas, ritual texts, poems and hymns, as well as new revelations (such as treasure texts and "pure vision" texts).

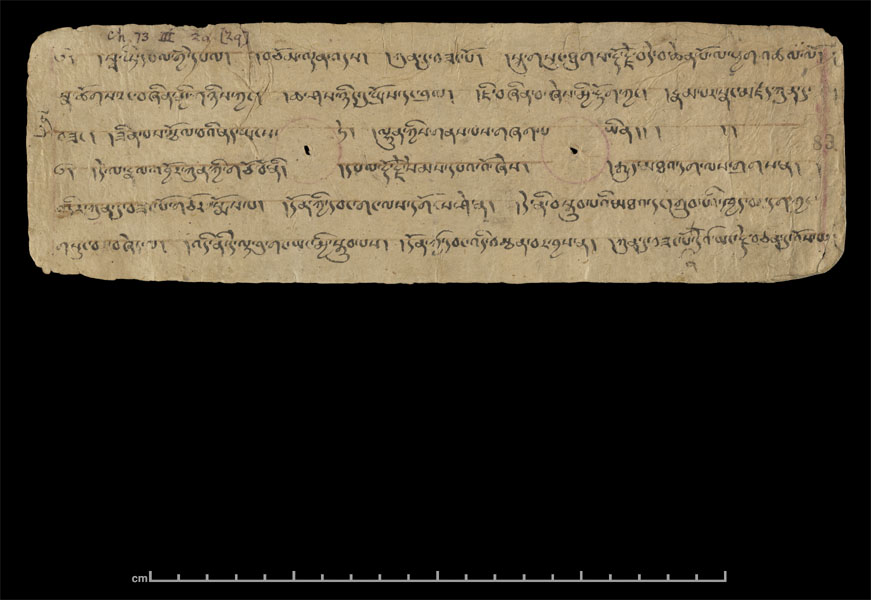
Part of the early Dzogchen 'Semde' text called The Cuckoo of Rigpa, found at Dunhuang.

The Nyingma school for example, maintains a large collection of texts which are part of their "Dzogchen" (Great Perfection) tradition. This class of tantric Buddhist texts is divided into three divisions: the "Mind Series" (Semde, the earliest Dzogchen texts, c. 9th century), which includes tantras like the Kulayarāja Tantra (All Creating King), the "Space Series" (Longde, c. 11th–14th centuries), and the "Esoteric Instructions" series (Menngagde, c. 11th–14th centuries), which include the Seventeen Tantras and the Vima Nyingthig. The Nyingma school also maintains other collections of texts called "Terma" (Treasure Texts). These texts were revealed by "treasure revealers" (tertons) at different times in Tibetan history. Examples include the Bardo Thödol (the "Tibetan Book of the Dead"), the Longchen Nyingthig, Dudjom Tersar and the Yuthok Nyingthig.

The Kagyu school on the other hand maintains several collections of tantric texts which are unique to their school. These include the Collected works of Milarepa (Mila Gnubum, which includes his many songs), the Collected works of Gampopa (Dagpo Kabum, including Jewel Ornament of Liberation), and, for the Karma Kagyu school, the works of lineage masters like the Karmapas. The Kagyu tradition emphasizes the esoteric practice of Mahamudra, and as such, they also maintain many collections of texts that focus on this method. The seventh Karmapa Chödrak Gyatso (1454- 1506) collected many Indian Mahamudra sources into the three volume collection called The Indian Mahāmudrā Treatises (Tib. Phyag rgya chen po 'i rgya gzhung).

In the Gelug school, the tantric works of the founder Tsongkhapa and his direct disciples are generally seen as foundational texts. The Sakya school and the Jonang school likewise maintain collections of the tantric works of their founding figures, such as Sakya Pandita and Dolpopa respectively.

== See also ==
- Buddhist texts – Historic literature and religious texts of Buddhism
- Sanskrit Buddhist literature
- Sanskrit literature – Literature of Sanskrit language
