= Goki calendar =

Japanese lunisolar calendar

The Goki calendar (五紀暦, Goki-reki), also known as Wuji li, was a Japanese lunisolar calendar (genka reki). It was developed in China; and it was used in Japan in the mid-9th century.

== History ==
The Goki-reki system corrected errors in the Taien calendar which was used in Japan in the first half of the 9th century. The corrections were the work of Akasuga Manomaro.

== See also ==
- Japanese calendar
- Sexagenary cycle
