= Susiddhikara Sūtra =

The Susiddhikara-sūtra is a Buddhist sutra of the esoteric or Vajrayana tradition, and is often included with two other tantric texts: the Mahāvairocana-sūtra and the Vajraśekhara-sūtra. In the Tendai tradition the Susiddhikara-sūtra is called the soshitsujikara-kyō (蘇悉地羯羅経) and is thought to unify the other two. Although there is no extant Sanskrit language version of the text, it was translated and preserved into Chinese in 726 by one Śubhākarasiṃha. It has also been translated into Tibetan.

The Chinese version is composed in 3 fascicles, and begins with a series of questions and answers regarding utilizing tantra effectively, while the remaining chapters address these questions, along with providing classifications of tantric rites, and deities.
