= Liang Lingzan =

Chinese engineer and astronomer

Liang Lingzan (simplified Chinese: 梁令瓒; traditional Chinese: 梁令瓚; pinyin: Liáng Lìngzàn; Wade–Giles: Liang Ling-Tsan) was a Chinese artist, astronomer, inventor, mechanical engineer and politician of the Kaiyuan era during the Tang dynasty. He invented a mechanized water clock with the Tantric monk and mathematician Yi Xing (Chinese: 一行; pinyin: Yī Xíng; Wade–Giles: I-Hsing). It was actually an astronomical instrument that served as a clock, made of bronze in the capital of Chang'an in the 720s. It was described by a contemporary text this way:

[It] was made in the image of the round heavens and on it were shown the lunar mansions in their order, the equator and the degrees of the heavenly circumference. Water, flowing into scoops, turned a wheel automatically, rotating it one complete revolution in one day and night. Besides this, there were two rings fitted around the celestial sphere outside, having the sun and moon threaded on them, and these were made to move in circling orbit ... And they made a wooden casing the surface of which represented the horizon, since the instrument was half sunk in it. It permitted the exact determinations of the time of dawns and dusks, full and new moons, tarrying and hurrying. Moreover, there were two wooden jacks standing on the horizon surface, having one a bell and the other a drum in front of it, the bell being struck automatically to indicate the hours, and the drum being beaten automatically to indicate the quarters. All these motions were brought about by machinery within the casing, each depending on wheels and shafts, hooks, pins and interlocking rods, stopping devices and locks checking mutually.

In addition to being a mechanical engineer and government official, Lingzan was also an active scholar and artist. He wrote The Five-Planet and Twenty-eight Constellation Deities (Chinese: 五星二十八宿神形; pinyin: wǔxīng èrshíbāxiù shénxíng), of which a Song dynasty copy resides in the collection of the Osaka City Art Museum.

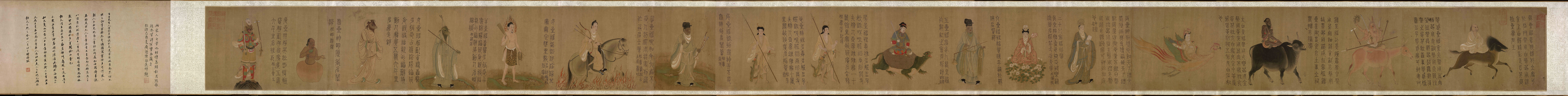
Part of the Five Stars and Twenty-Eight Mansions, by Liang Lingzan (梁令瓒), .
