= Yi Xing =

8th-century Buddhist monk and astronomer

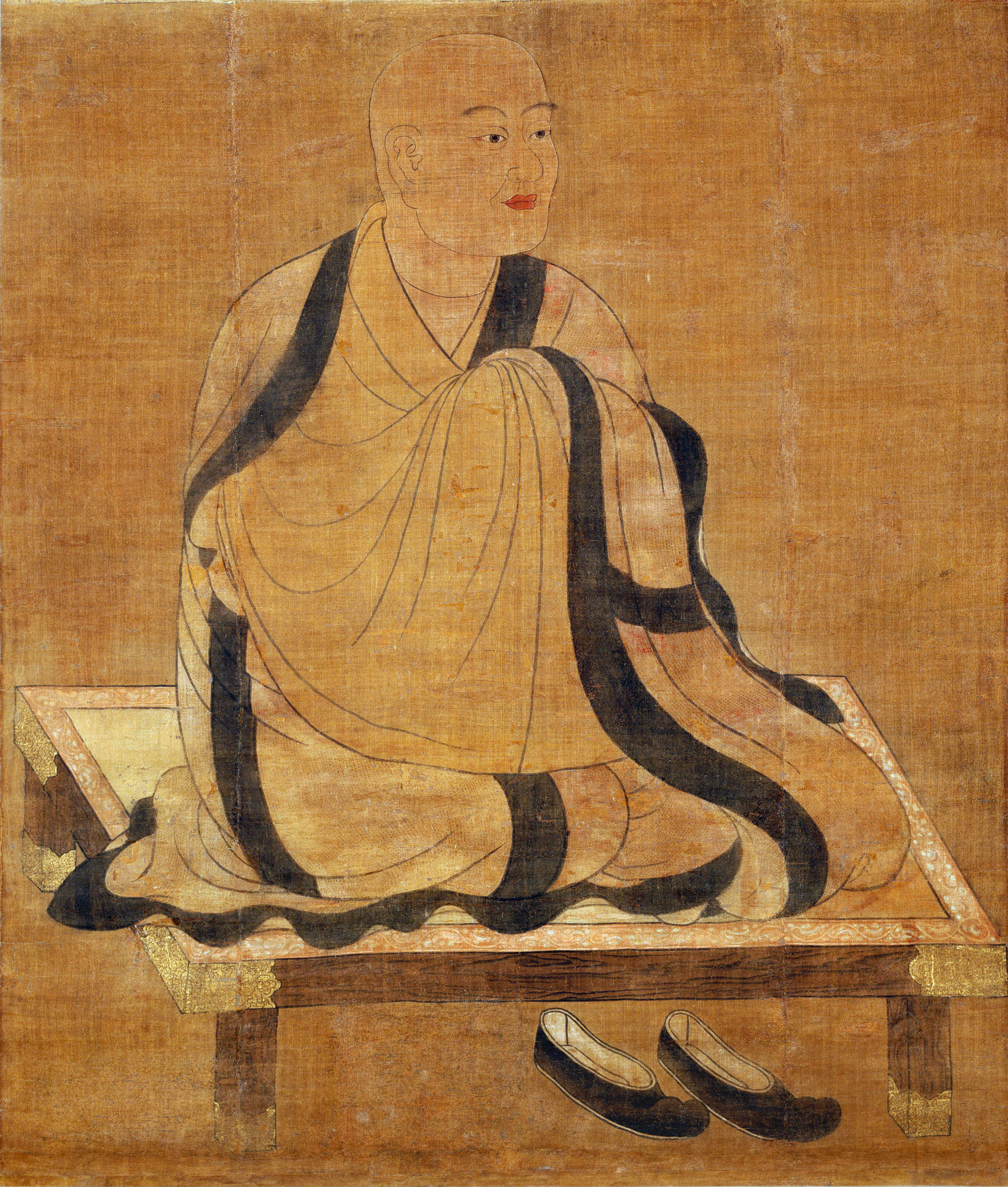
Painting of Yi Xing from the Shingon Hassozō, a series of scrolls depicting the first eight patriarchs of the Shingon school of Buddhism. Japan, Kamakura Period (13th-14th century)

Yixing (Chinese: 一行; pinyin: Yīxíng; Wade–Giles: I-Hsing, 683–727) was a Buddhist monk of the Tang dynasty, recognized for his accomplishments as an astronomer, a reformer of the calendar system, a specialist in the Yijing (易經), and a distinguished Buddhist figure with expertise in Esoteric Buddhism.

In the realm of secular affairs, Yixing gained prominence for his reforms to the imperial calendar and his construction of a celestial globe featuring a liquid-driven escapement, the first in a long tradition of Chinese astronomical clockworks. Within Buddhist circles, he is particularly remembered for his contributions to the translation of the Mahāvairocana-sūtra and for authoring the authoritative commentary on that scripture, the Darijing shu 大日經疏 (T 1796). Due to his significant activities in both religious and secular spheres, a legendary portrayal of Yixing as a master astrologer and practitioner of astral magic developed during the late Tang period, leading to the attribution of several astrological works to him.

== Life ==
Originally named Zhang Sui (張遂), Yixing (一行), was born in Changle, Weizhou (modern Nanle in Hebei) though other sources suggest his birthplace was Julu, present-day Pingxiang, Hebei. A great-grandson of the Tang dynasty statesman Zhang Gongjin (張公謹; 584–632), Yixing came from a distinguished family, possibly influencing his later connection to the Tang court. His early intelligence was recognized in the Jiu Tang shu, which records his precocious mastery of classical texts, particularly in astronomy, calendrical science, and traditional Chinese philosophy. After the deaths of his parents at age 21, Yixing renounced secular life and was ordained as a Buddhist monk. He trained under several masters, including Hongjing and Facheng, and later under Puji at Mount Song, receiving transmission within the Northern Chan lineage. His deep cultivation of "single-practice samādhi" (一行三昧) led to his monastic name, and there is evidence suggesting he was also a disciple of Shenxiu. Throughout his early career, Yixing displayed exceptional devotion to the study of the Vinaya, and he composed a now-lost treatise on Vinaya essentials.

During the early eighth century, Yixing avoided political entanglement with powerful figures such as Wu Sansi, choosing instead a life of itinerancy, seeking Buddhist instruction throughout the southern regions. He studied the "Indian Vinaya" under Wuzhen at Mount Dangyang and received additional teachings from the monk Daoyi. In 717, Emperor Xuanzong personally summoned Yixing to the capital, where he became an esteemed religious advisor, frequently consulted on matters of governance and the welfare of the people. Yixing spent his final years primarily in Chang'an and Luoyang, focusing on religious activities. In 727, after a period of illness during which extensive merit-making ceremonies were performed for his recovery, Yixing died while traveling with the emperor. Xuanzong composed the inscription for his memorial stele, and posthumously conferred upon him the title Meditation Master Dahui (大慧禪師).

Yixing’s most significant contributions during his later life centered around his involvement in the translation and interpretation of Esoteric Buddhist texts. He collaborated with the Indian master Śubhakarasiṃha in translating the Mahāvairocana-sūtra, working primarily as an editor and recorder rather than as a direct translator, suggesting limited proficiency in Sanskrit. The surviving Chinese translation condenses the much larger Sanskrit original. Yixing also compiled an influential commentary on the Mahāvairocana-sūtra, preserving Śubhakarasiṃha’s oral teachings while incorporating his own notes and references to Chinese Buddhist sources. Two versions of this commentary survive, the Dari jing shu (大日經疏) and the Dari jing yishi (大日經義釋). The work reflects a synthesis of Esoteric Buddhist thought with elements of Huayan philosophy and cites seminal texts such as Nāgārjuna’s Madhyamaka-śāstra and the Da zhidu lun.

In addition to his work with Śubhakarasiṃha, Yixing is also reported to have studied under Vajrabodhi, from whom he received the Vajraśekhara abhiṣeka initiation and whom he assisted in translation efforts. His literary contributions extend beyond Esoteric Buddhism; the Jiu Tang shu lists a lost work titled Shishi xilu (釋氏系錄), which appears to have covered a wide range of monastic regulations and practices. Yixing's legacy, while celebrated for his astronomical and calendrical reforms in secular histories, is equally significant in the Buddhist tradition for his pioneering role in the early transmission of Esoteric Buddhism to China.

=== Legends ===
Yixing’s prominence gave rise to many legendary narratives about him. Japanese sources recount that when Yixing’s mother was pregnant, a halo of white light appeared on her forehead, later transferring to the newborn Yixing. Stories portraying him as an extraordinary figure also circulated in Tang dynasty literature, indicating his influence beyond Buddhist circles. Notably, texts like the Kaitian chuanxin ji, Minghuang zalu buyi, and Youyang zazu record anecdotes of Yixing appearing as a spirit and bearing the Daoist title "Heavenly Master." Moreover, the Jiu Tang shu describes Yixing’s encounter with a Daoist named Yin Chong, from whom he borrowed the Taixuan jing. Demonstrating rapid mastery of its profound teachings, Yixing impressed Yin Chong by producing new scholarly works. Such tales, while celebrating Yixing’s intellect, are likely hagiographical embellishments intended to bolster his reputation.

Another account details Yixing’s search for instruction in the Yijing’s number theory, eventually leading him to Guoqing Temple on Mount Tiantai. According to legend, he was foretold by a monk within the temple and miraculously admitted when the waters outside reversed their flow, symbolizing his destined arrival. Although framed within Buddhist texts like the Song Gaoseng zhuan, this story is more connected to mathematical traditions than Buddhist practice. In the late Tang, as foreign astrology gained prominence and astral magic merged into both Buddhism and Daoism, Yixing’s image evolved further. He became associated with esoteric rites involving stellar deities, such as summoning the gods of the 28 lunar stations, as recorded in the Qiyao xingchen bie xingfa. These accounts, blending elements of Mantrayāna and astrology, reflect a mythologized view of Yixing shaped by the cultural and religious currents of the time.

== Astronomical work ==
=== Astrogeodetic survey ===
In the early 8th century, the Tang court put Yi Xing in charge of an astrogeodetic survey. This survey had many purposes. It was established in order to obtain new astronomical data that would aid in the prediction of solar eclipses. The survey was also initiated so that flaws in the calendar system could be corrected and a new, updated calendar installed in its place.

The survey was also essential in determining the arc measurement, i.e., the length of meridian arc-although Yi Xing, who did not know the Earth was spherical, did not conceptualize his measurements in these terms. This would resolve the confusion created by the earlier practice of using the difference between shadow lengths of the sun observed at the same time at two places to determine the ground distance between them.

Yi Xing had thirteen test sites established throughout the empire, extending from Jiaozhou in Vietnam — at latitude 17°N — to the region immediately south of Lake Baikal — latitude 50°N. There were three observations done for each site, one for the height of polaris, one for the shadow lengths of summer, and one for the shadow lengths of winter. The latitudes were determined from this data, while the Tang calculation for the length of one degree of meridian was fairly accurate compared to modern calculations. Yi Xing understood the variations in the length of a degree of meridian, and criticized earlier scholars who permanently fixed an estimate for shadow lengths for the duration of the entire year.

=== The escapement and celestial globe ===
Yi Xing was famed for his genius, known to have calculated the number of possible positions on a go board game (though without a symbol for zero as he had difficulties expressing the number). He, along with his associate, the mechanical engineer and politician Liang Lingzan, is best known for applying the earliest-known escapement mechanism to a water-powered celestial globe. However, Yi Xing's mechanical achievements were built upon the knowledge and efforts of previous Chinese mechanical engineers, such as the statesman and master of gear systems Zhang Heng (78–139) of the Han dynasty, the mechanical engineer Ma Jun (200–265) of the Three Kingdoms, and the Daoist Li Lan (c. 450) of the Southern and Northern Dynasties period.

It was the earlier Chinese inventor Zhang Heng during the Han dynasty who was the first to apply hydraulic power (i.e. a waterwheel and water clock) in mechanically-driving and rotating his equatorial armillary sphere. The arrangement followed the model of a water-wheel using the drip of a clepsydra (see water clock), which ultimately exerted force on a lug to rotate toothed-gears on a polar-axis shaft. With this, the slow computational movement rotated the armillary sphere according to the recorded movements of the planets and stars. Yi Xing also owed much to the scholarly followers of Ma Jun, who had employed horizontal jack-wheels and other mechanical toys worked by waterwheels. The Daoist Li Lan was an expert at working with water clocks, creating steelyard balances for weighing water that was used in the tank of the clepsydra, providing more inspiration for Yi Xing. Like the earlier water-power employed by Zhang Heng and the later escapement mechanism in the astronomical clock tower engineered and erected by Su Song (1020–1101), Yi Xing's celestial globe employed water-power in order for it to rotate and function properly.

The British biochemist, historian, and sinologist Joseph Needham states (Wade–Giles spelling):

When the first escapement came, in +725 (AD), I-Hsing and Liang Ling-tsan arranged for two jacks to strike the hours, standing on the horizon surface of their sphere or globe.

In regards to mercury instead of water (as noted in the quote above), the first to apply liquid mercury for motive power of an armillary sphere was Zhang Sixun in 979 AD (because mercury would not freeze during winter). During his age, the Song dynasty (960–1279) era historical text of the Song Shi mentions Yi Xing and the reason why his armillary sphere did not survive the ages after the Tang (Wade–Giles spelling):

A jade balancing mechanism (yu heng)(ie. the escapement) is erected behind (lit. outside) a curtain, holding and resisting (chhih o) the main scoops (shu tou). Water pours down rotating the wheel (chu shui chi lun). Lower, there is a cog-wheel (chi lun) with 43 (teeth). There are also hooks, pins, and interlocking rods one holding another (kou chien chiao tsho hsiang chhih). Each (wheel) moves the next without reliance on any human force. The fastest wheel turns round each day through 2928 teeth (chhih), the slowest one moves by 1 tooth in every 5 days. Such a great difference is there between the speed of the wheels, yet all of them depend on one single driving mechanism. In precision, the engine can be compared with Nature itself (lit. the maker of all things; tsao wu che). As for the rest, it is much the same as the apparatus made (long ago) by I-Hsing. But that old design employed mainly bronze and iron, which corroded and rusted so that the machine ceased to be able to move automatically. The modern plan substitutes hard wood for these parts, as beautiful as jade...

Earlier Tang era historical texts of the 9th century have this to say of Yi Xing's work in astronomical instruments in the 8th century (Wade–Giles spelling):

One (of these) was made in the image of the round heavens (yuan thien chih hsiang) and on it were shown the lunar mansions (hsiu) in their order, the equator and the degrees of the heavenly circumference. Water, flowing (into scoops), turned a wheel automatically (chu shui chi lun, ling chhi tzu chuan), rotating it (the sphere) one complete revolution in one day and night. Besides this, there were two rings (lit. wheels) fitted round the celestial (sphere) outside, having the sun and moon threaded on them, and there were made to move in circling orbit (ling te yun hsing). Each day as the celestial (sphere) turned one revolution westwards, the sun made its way one degree eastwards, and the moon 13 and 7/19 degrees (eastwards). After 29 and a fraction rotations (of the celestial sphere) the sun and moon met. After it made 365 rotations the sun accomplished its complete circuit. And they made a wooden casing the surface of which represented the horizon, since the instrument was half sunk in it. This permitted the exact determinations of the times of dawns and dusks, full and new moons, tarrying and hurrying. Moreover there were two wooden jacks standing on the horizon surface, having one a bell and the other a drum in front of it, the bell being struck automatically to indicate the hours, and the drum being beaten automatically to indicate the quarters.

All these motions were brought about (by machinery) within the casing, each depending on wheels and shafts (lun chu), hooks, pins and interlocking rods (kou chien chiao tsho), coupling devices and locks checking mutually (kuan so hsiang chhih)(ie. the escapement). Since (the clock) showed good agreement with the Tao of Heaven, everyone at that time praised its ingenuity. When it was all completed (in +725) it was called the 'Water-Driven Spherical Bird's-Eye-View Map of the Heavens (Shui Yun Hun Thien Fu Shih Thu) or 'Celestial Sphere Model Water-Engine' and was set up in front of the Wu Chheng Hall (of the Palace) to be seen by the multitude of officials. Candidates in the imperial examinations (in +730) were asked to write an essay on the new armillary (clock). But not very long afterwards the mechanism of bronze and iron began to corrode and rust, so that the instrument could no longer rotate automatically. It was therefore relegated to the (museum of the) College of All Sages (Chi Hsien Yuan) and went out of use.

== Buddhist scholarship ==
Yi Xing wrote a commentary on the Mahavairocana Tantra. This work had a strong influence on the Japanese monk Kūkai and was key in his establishment of Shingon Buddhism.

== In his honor ==
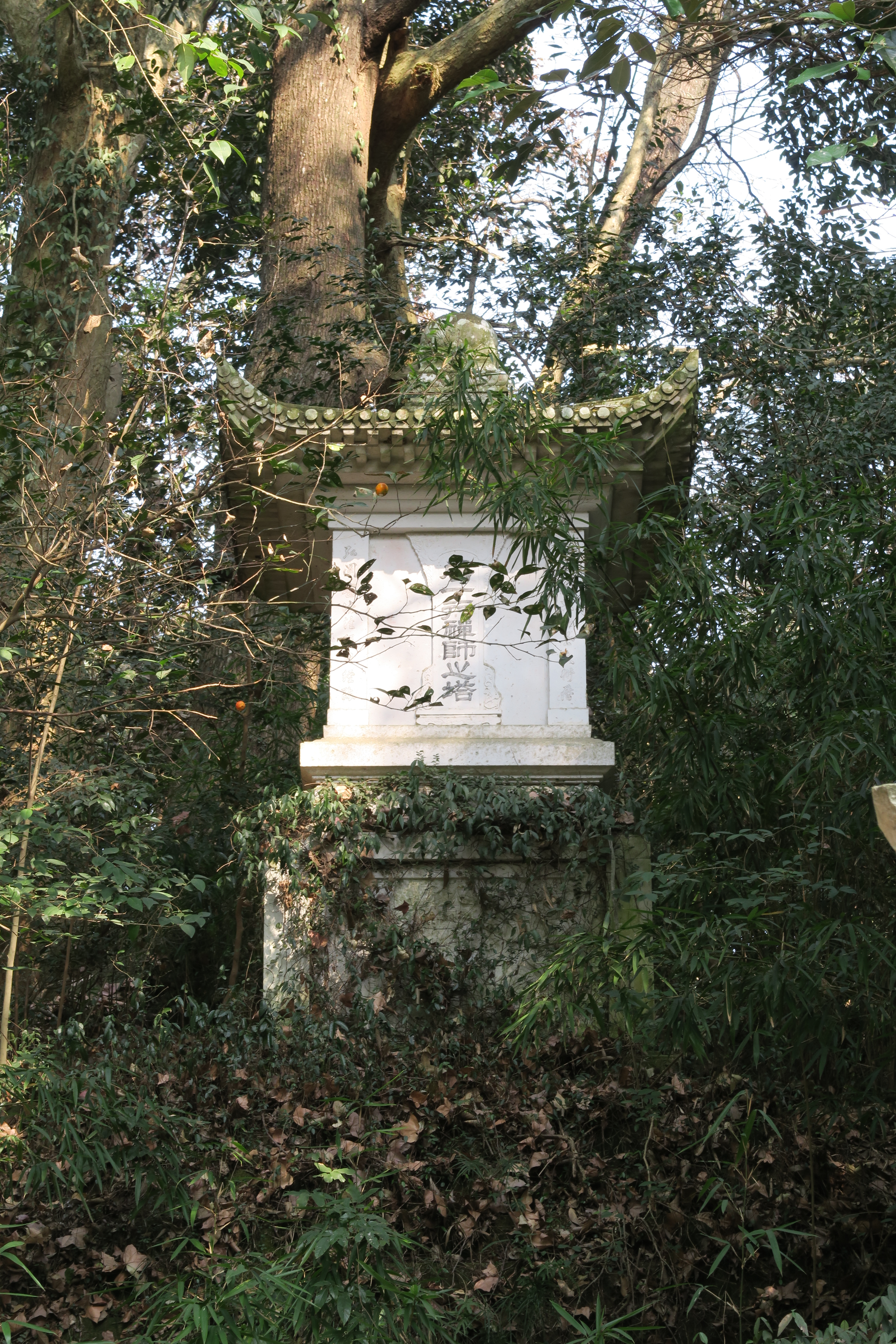
Memorial Pagoda of Monk Yi Xing

At the Tiantai-Buddhist Guoqing Temple of Mount Tiantai in Zhejiang Province, there is a Chinese pagoda erected directly outside the temple known as the Memorial Pagoda of Monk Yi Xing. His tomb is also located on Mount Tiantai.

== See also ==
- List of Chinese people
- List of inventors
- List of mechanical engineers
- Verge escapement
- Villard de Honnecourt
