= Gihō calendar =

Japanese lunisolar calendar

The Gihō calendar (儀鳳暦, Gihō-reki), also known as Yi-feng li, was a Japanese lunisolar calendar (genka reki).

== History ==
The calendar was created in China. It was first used in the Rintoku era during the Tang dynasty.

The Gihō-reki system was brought from Korea to Japan between 676 and 678, during the Asuka period of Japanese history. This calendar corrected errors in the Genka calendar which was also developed in China. For a short time, both Genka and Gihō calendars were in use.

== See also ==
- Japanese calendar
- Sexagenary cycle
