= Buddhaguhya =

Vajrayana Buddhist scholar-monk

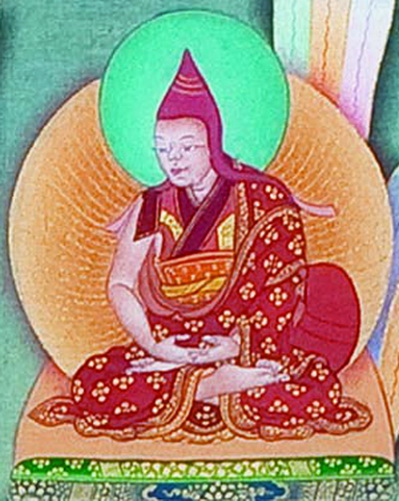
Buddhaguhya

Buddhaguhya (also known as Buddhagupta) (fl. c.700 CE) was a Vajrayana Buddhist scholar-monk. Throughout his career he taught at multiple locations including the monastery of Nālandā and Vārāṇasī, and spent time in meditation near Mount Kailash. Vimalamitra was one of his students.

A major commentary by Buddhaguhya of the Mahavairocana Tantra was written in 760 and is preserved in Tibetan. Hodge translates it into English alongside the text itself. Apart from his commentary on the Maha-Vairocana-Abhisambodhi Tantra, little is known of Buddhaguhya.

== Life ==
The details of Buddhaguhya's life start to emerge in the thirteenth and fourteenth centuries, hundreds of years after his death and therefore cannot be historically verified. This was mainly detailed in the hagiographical writings of Tibetan authors like Longchenpa, Chomden Rigpe Raldri, Buton Rinchen Drub and Taranatha.

Taranatha claimed that Buddhaguhya was born near the city of Varanasi while Dudjom Jikdrel Dorje states he was born in Central India. Buddhaguhya was the son of a King and belonged to the kshatriya caste. The King's wish was for his son to become a religious teacher so he asked Buddhaguhya to meditate on the Bodhisattva, Mañjuśrī. He initially took to this practice but later began to doubt himself causing bad omens to occur.

Taking his father's permission, he travelled to eastern India where he was ordained as a scholar at Nalanda monastery. There is a lack of clarity in the Tibetan sources as to exactly which scholars Buddhaguhya studied under. The Nyingma tradition also holds that he travelled to Uddiyana as well. During his time of study, he mastered the tantras and achieved the position of royal chaplain as well.

As per Taranatha, Buddhaguhya travelled with another monk called Buddhaśānta to Mount Potalaka in Tamil Nadu, the supposed residence of the bodhisattva, Avalokiteśvara. Once they reached the top of the mountain, they saw only a stone image of Avalokiteśvara. Disappointed, as they descended the mountain, the deity Tara is said to have appeared before them in the form of an old woman and instructed the pair of them to practice meditation in Mount Kailash. Buddhaguhya however became jealous of Buddhaśānta's clairvoyance and instead travelled to Varanasi where he spent several years teaching. During this period, he had a vision of Mañjuśrī who also asked him to practice meditation in Mount Kailash.

After travelling through the Himalayas, he settled at a rookery near the mountain and began his practice. This attracted the attention of Tibetan royalty who subsequently sent several envoys to try and convince Buddhaguhya to teach in Tibet. This included requests from Trisong Detsen, the emperor of Tibet at the time. Buddhaguhya rejected these requests but instead taught the envoys and initiated them into the Vajradhātu maṇḍala. He also sent them commentaries and his own writings including the Epistle to the Ruler, his Subjects, and the Clergy of Tibet.

Some sources detail that after his period of practice at Mount Kailash, Buddhaguhya returned to India to continue his teaching until his death.
