= Goki Tomozawa =

Japanese footballer

Personal information
- Full name: Goki Tomozawa
- Date of birth: February 14, 1991 (age 35)
- Place of birth: Kanagawa, Japan
- Height: 1.71 m (5 ft 7 1/2 in)
- Position: Forward

Youth career
- 2009–2012: Hosei University

Senior career*
Years	Team	Apps	(Gls)
2013–2015	YSCC Yokohama	93	(9)
Total		93	(9)
- * Club domestic league appearances and goals

Goki Tomozawa (友澤 剛気, Tomozawa Goki; born February 14, 1991) is a former Japanese football player. Takaki Tomozawa is his brother.

== Playing career ==
Goki Tomozawa played for YSCC Yokohama from 2013 to 2015.
