= Vairocanābhisaṃbodhi Sūtra =

Vajrayana Buddhist text

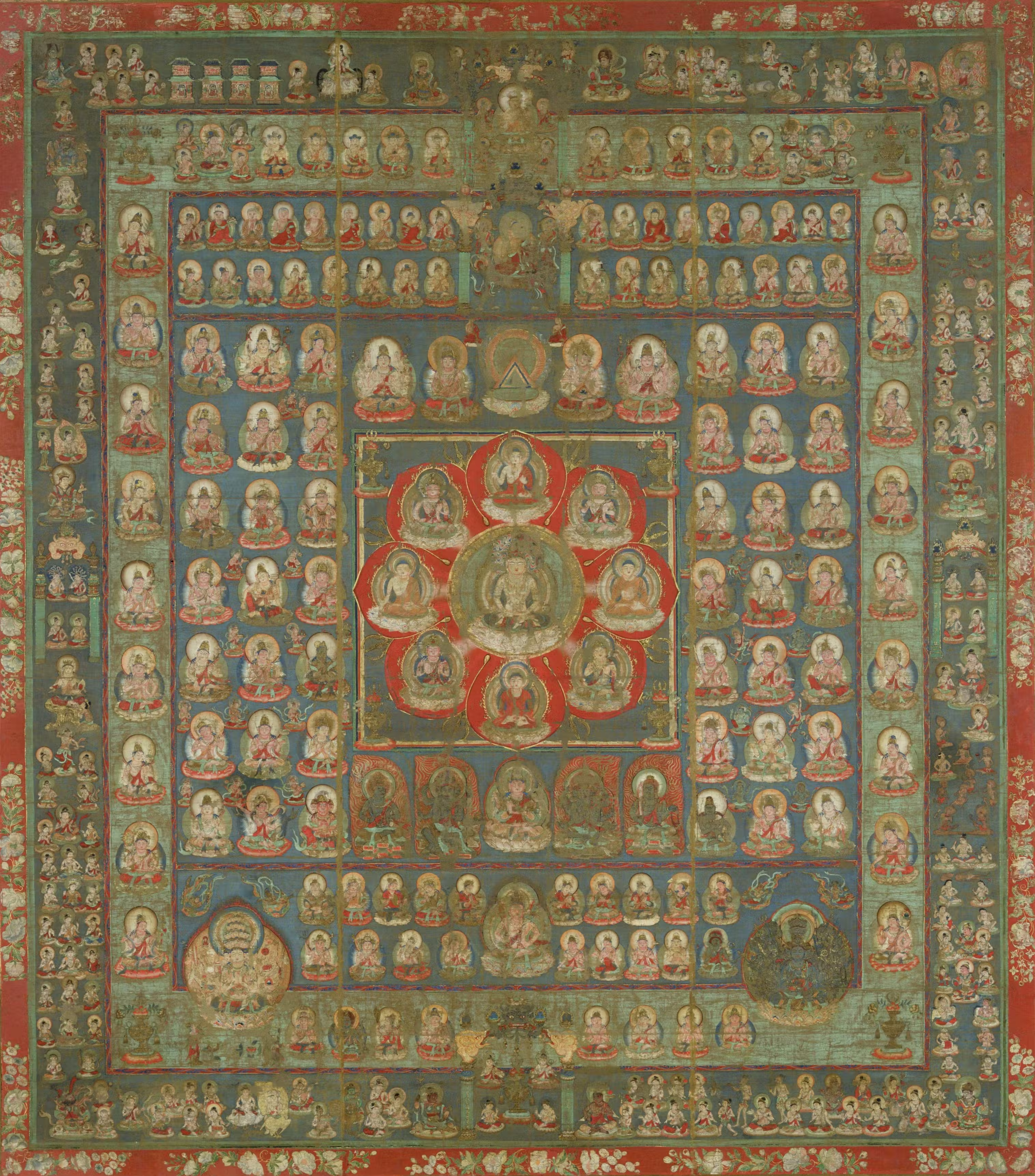
The Garbhadhātu maṇḍala as used in Śubhakarasiṃha's teachings from the Mahāvairocana Tantra. Vairocana is located in the center.

The Vairocanābhisaṃbodhi Sūtra (Vairocana’s Awakening Sutra, Sanskrit: 𑀯𑁃𑀭𑁄𑀘𑀦𑀸𑀪𑀺𑀲𑀁𑀩𑁄𑀥𑀺𑀲𑀽𑀢𑁆𑀭), also known as the Mahāvairocana Tantra (Sanskrit: 𑀫𑀳𑀸𑀯𑁃𑀭𑁄𑀘𑀦𑀢𑀦𑁆; traditional Chinese: 大毘盧遮那成佛神變加持經; ; pinyin: Dà Pílúzhēnà Chéngfó Shénbiàn Jiāchí Jīng; also known as 大日經 Da Ri Jing) is an important Vajrayana Buddhist text composed before 674 CE. The Indian tantric master Buddhaguhya (fl. c.700 CE) classified the text as a caryātantra, and in Tibetan Buddhism it is still considered to be a member of the carya classification. In Japan where it is known as the Mahāvairocana Sūtra (Daibirushana jōbutsu jinpen kajikyō), it is one of two central texts in the Shingon school, along with the Vajrasekhara Sutra. Both are also part of the Tendai school.

Though the text is often called a tantra by later figures (including later Indian commentators), the scripture does not call itself a tantra.

== Composition & history ==
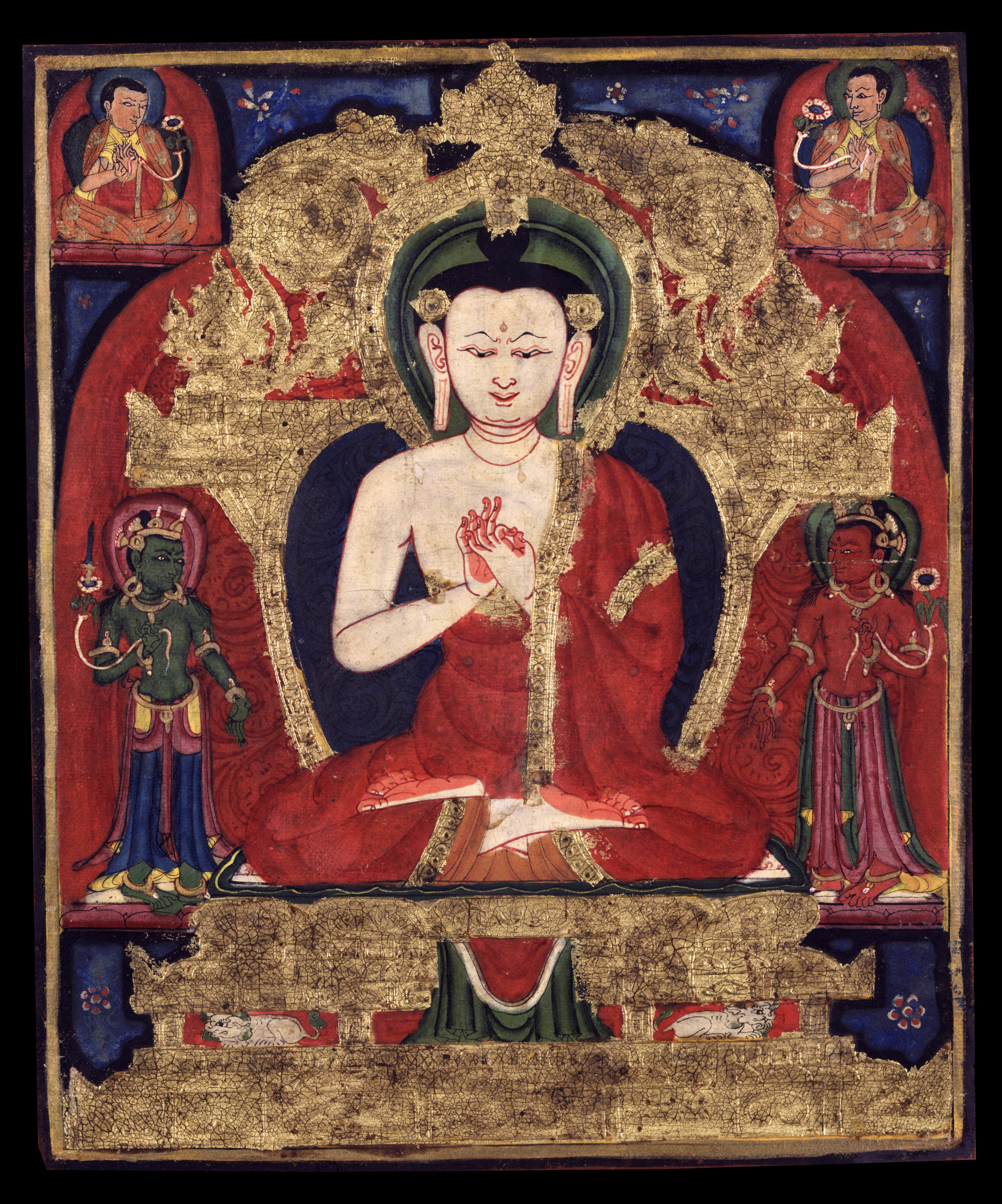
Tibetan representation of Buddha Vairocana, featuring several of his defining characteristics, including his white color, the teaching gesture (dharmacakramudra), and sitting on an elaborate lion throne.

The Mahāvairocana Tantra is the first true Buddhist tantra, the earliest comprehensive manual of tantric Buddhism. It was probably composed in the middle of the 7th century, in all probability in north-eastern India at Nālandā. Evidence to support the text's composition in Nalanda include the fact that many of the Buddhist scholars involved in the transmission of the text resided in Nalanda including Buddhaguhya, Śubhakarasiṃha, Chandrakirti, Naropa and Abhayakaragupta amongst others. The description of plants and trees in the MVT also matches those found in the region surrounding Nalanda in North-East India. The Vairocanābhisaṃbodhi Sūtra also circulated in the monastic university of Vikramashila where it was cited in the works of Atiśa, Ratnākaraśānti and Jñanasrimitra.

The longer title of the scripture is Mahāvairocanābhisaṃbodhi-vikurvitādhiṣṭhāna-vaipulyasūtrendrarāja-nāma-dharmaparyāya (The Section of the Dharma Called “Mahāvairocana’s Superior Perfect Enlightenment and His Empowerment of Supernatural Transformations,” the King of the Foremost Extensive Sutras).

According to Rolf Giebel, "the Chinese translation was produced in seven fascicles by Śubhākarasiṃha (637–735) and his Chinese disciple Yixing (683–727) in 724–5, apparently on the basis of a manuscript sent to China some decades earlier by the Chinese monk Wuxing, who died in India in 674."

The Mahāvairocana Tantra was later translated into Tibetan sometime before 812 by Śīlendrabodhi and Kawa Paltsek.

The Sanskrit text of the Mahāvairocana Tantra is lost, but it survives in Chinese and Tibetan translations. The Chinese translation has preserved the original Sanskrit mantras in the Siddhaṃ script. There are translations from both into English. (see below).

A major commentary by Buddhaguhya was written in about 760 and is preserved in Tibetan. Hodge translates it into English alongside the text itself. Four originally Sanskrit commentaries on the Vairocanābhisaṃbodhi have survived, two by Śubhākarasiṃha (extant in Chinese) and two by Buddhaguhya (extant in Tibetan).

In East Asian Esoteric Buddhism, the most widely used commentary is the Pronunciations Basic Meaning: Commentary on the Mahāvairocana-abhisaṃbodhi-tantra (大毘盧遮那成佛經疏, T 1796.39.579a-649c), usually called by the abbreviated name, the Dainichi kyō. It was written by Yixing, and was mostly based on the teachings given by Śubhakarasiṃha (637-735 CE). This commentary is key in both Tendai and Shingon.

Kūkai learned of the Mahāvairocana Tantra in 796, and travelled to China in 804 to receive instruction in it.

== Contents ==
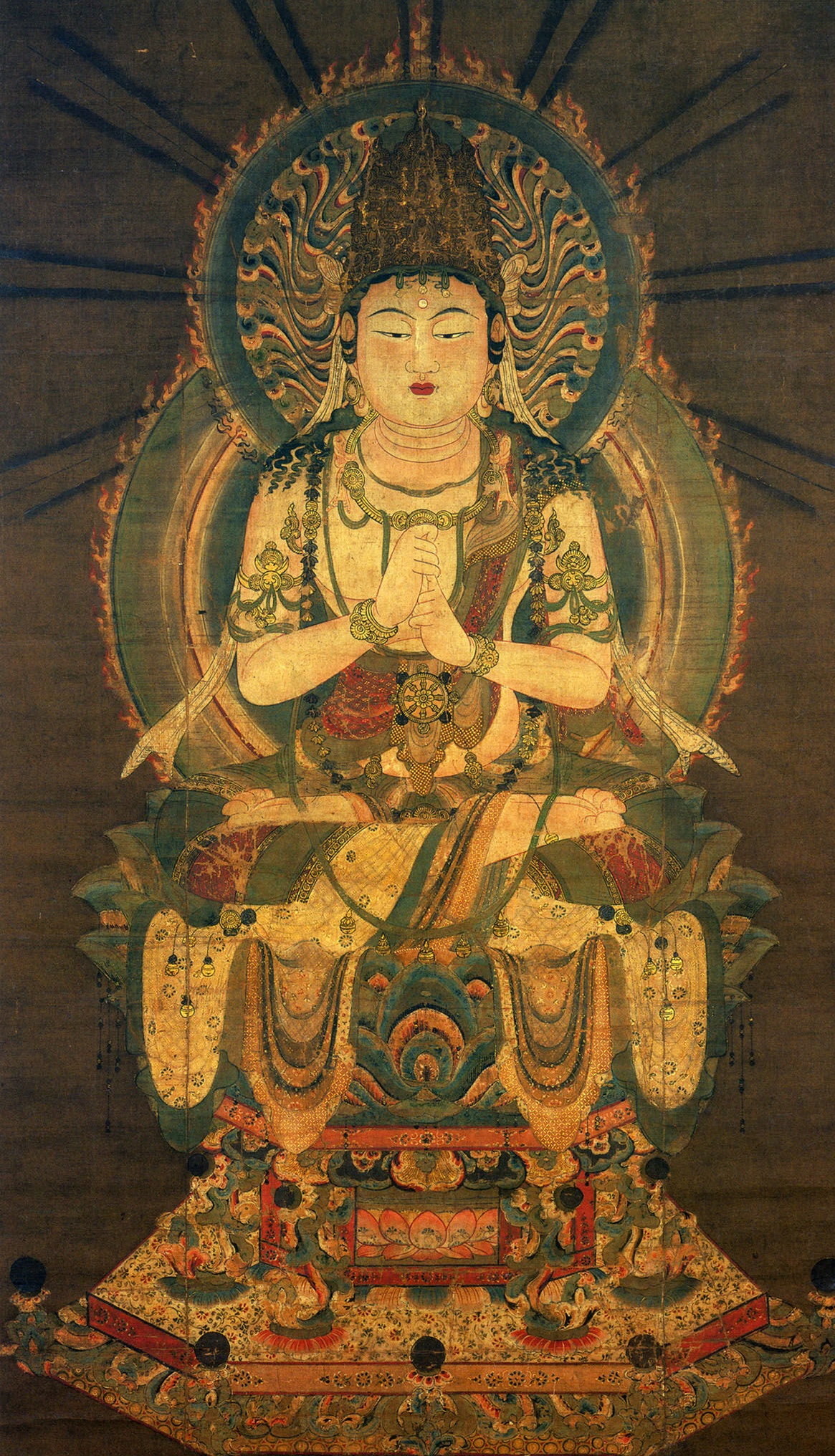
12th century painting of Mahāvairocana, Heian period, collecting in Nezu Museum

The Mahāvairocana Tantra consists of three primary mandalas corresponding to the body, speech and mind of Mahāvairocana, as well as preliminary practices and initiation rituals. According to Buddhaguhya’s Piṇḍārtha (a summary of the main points of the tantra) the Mahāvairocana Tantra system of practice is in three stages: preliminary, application, and accomplishment. Attached here and there are doctrinal passages, and sadhana practices which relate back to the main mandalas.

The following outline is based on Hodge's translation of the Tibetan version of the Sutra. The Chinese version has differences in the order of the chapters.

=== Chapters ===
- I: The sutra begins in a timeless setting of Mahavairocana Buddha's palace (symbolizing all of existence), with a dialogue between Mahavairocana Buddha and his disciple Vajrasattva. In chapter one, Mahavairocana Buddha expounds the Dharma to a great host of bodhisattvas, with emphasis on the relationship between form and emptiness.
- II-VI: Three chapters on the mandala of the Body Mystery with detailed instruction on the laying out of the mandala and the abhiṣekha ritual. This mandala is also known as the Mandala of the Womb Realm (Sanskrit : Garbhakosha).
- VII-IX: Three miscellaneous chapters originally at the end of the text. They are at the end in the Chinese version.
- X-XII: Three chapters on the mandala of the Speech Mystery. Includes a series of glosses on meditating using the letters of the alphabet in various combinations.
- XII-XVIv Five chapters on the mandala of the Mind Mystery.
- XVII: A stand alone chapter that may once have circulated separately.
- XVIII-XIX: A further chapter regarding meditating on the letters of the alphabet which involves placing them around the body while visualising oneself as the Buddha.
- XX: A standalone chapter address to bodhisattvas.
- XXI-XXV: Four chapters on the 100 syllable meditation.
- XXVI-XXX: Five miscellaneous chapters including the six homa rites.

=== Esoteric precepts ===
Chapter 2 of the sutra also contains four precepts, called the samaya, that form the basic precepts esoteric Buddhist practitioners must follow:

- Not to abandon the true Dharma;
- Not to deviate from one's own enlightened mind;
- Not to be reserved in sharing with others the Buddhist teachings;
- Not to bring harm to any sentient beings.

=== Shingon lineage ===
The Mahavairocana Tantra does not trace its lineage to Shakyamuni Buddha, the founder of Buddhism. Instead it comes directly from Mahavairocana. So, according to the Shingon tradition, the transmission lineage begins with Vajrasattva and continues eventually to Kūkai:

- Vajrasattva, the disciple of Mahavairocana Buddha in this sutra
- Nagarjuna received the text of the Mahāvairocana Tantra directly from Vajrasattva inside an iron stupa in South India
- Nagabodhi, Nagarjuna's disciple
- Vajrabodhi, an Indian monk famous for translating esoteric rituals into Chinese language
- Amoghavajra, Vajrabodhi's famous disciple, and expert in esoteric practices
- Huiguo, a Chinese esoteric master
- Kūkai, founder of Shingon Buddhism in Japan.

== Understanding of enlightenment ==
Within the vision of the Mahavairocana Sutra, the state of bodhi ("awakening, enlightenment") is seen as naturally inherent to the mind—the mind's natural and pure state (as in Dzogchen and Tathagatagarbha)—and is viewed as the perceptual sphere of non-duality, where all false distinctions between a perceiving subject and perceived objects are lifted and the true state of things (non-duality) is revealed. This is also the understanding of Enlightenment found in Yogacara Buddhism. To achieve this vision of non-duality, it is necessary to recognise one's own mind. Writing on the Mahavairocana Sutra, Buddhist scholar and translator of that scripture, Stephen Hodge, comments:

... when the MVT [i.e. Mahavairocana Tantra] speaks of knowing your mind as it truly is, it means that you are to know the inherent natural state of the mind by eliminating the split into a perceiving subject and perceived objects which normally occurs in the world and is wrongly thought to be real. This also corresponds to the Yogacara definition ... that emptiness (sunyata) is the absence of this imaginary split. ... We may further elucidate the meaning of Perfect Enlightenment and hence of the intrinsic nature of the mind by correlating terms [which Buddhist commentator on the Mahavairocana Sutra,] Buddhaguhya, treats as synonyms. For example, he defines emptiness (sunyata) as suchness (tathata) and says that suchness is the intrinsic nature (svabhava) of the mind which is Enlightenment (bodhi-citta). Moreover, he frequently uses the terms suchness (tathata) and Suchness-Awareness (tathata-jnana) interchangeably. But since Awareness (jnana) is non-dual, Suchness-Awareness is not so much the Awareness of Suchness, but the Awareness which is Suchness. In other words, the term Suchness-Awareness is functionally equivalent to Enlightenment. Finally, it must not be forgotten that this Suchness-Awareness or Perfect Enlightenment is Mahavairocana [the Primal Buddha, uncreated and forever existent]. In other words, the mind in its intrinsic nature is Mahavairocana, whom one "becomes" (or vice-versa) when one is perfectly enlightened.

The text also speaks of how all things can be accomplished once 'non-dual union with emptiness' is attained.

Yet ultimately even emptiness needs to be transcended, to the extent that it is not a vacuous emptiness, but the expanse of the mind of Buddha, Buddhic Awareness and Buddha-realms, all of which know of no beginning and no arising - as Stephen Hodge points out:

Finally, though one has realized the true emptiness of the individual and phenomena, one does not yet realize that the natural state of mind is the Tathagata's inherent Awareness and that it is the all-pervasive Body of Vairocana with all the manifested Buddha realms. Therefore one must transcend even emptiness with the emptiness of emptiness, when it is seen that the mind is primordially unborn and unarisen.

The sutra later reinforces the notion that Emptiness is not mere inert nothingness but is precisely the unlocalised locus where Vairocana resides. Vajrapani salutes the Buddha Vairocana with the following words:

I salute you who are bodhicitta [Awakened Mind]!

I salute you who are the source of Enlightenment! [...]

I bow to you who reside in emptiness!'

Emptiness in Buddhist discourse usually means the flow of causation and result - the arising of causes and conditions - but in this scripture, Mahavairocana Buddha declares himself to be separate from all causes and conditions and without defect - truly mighty:

I who am mighty have been renowned as the Great Hero. I directly realized that there is no arising, and abandoned the perceptual range of words; I became free from all faults, and separated from causes and conditions.

== Popular culture ==
The title of Chinese writer and film director Xu Haofeng's 徐浩峰 (b.1973) novel 《大日坛城》 Da ri tan cheng (published in 2010) refers to the Mahāvairocana Tantra.

== Bibliography ==
- Abé, Ryuichi (1999). The Weaving of Mantra: Kukai and the Construction of Esoteric Buddhist Discourse. New York, NY: Columbia University Press, ISBN 0-231-11286-6.
- Giebel, Rolf, transl. (2006), The Vairocanābhisaṃbodhi Sutra, Numata Center for Buddhist Translation and Research, Berkeley, ISBN 978-1-886439-32-0.
- Hodge, Stephen, transl. (2003). The mahā-vairocana-abhisaṃbodhi tantra: with Buddhaguhya’s commentary, London: RoutledgeCurzon, ISBN 978-1138980150.
- Hodge, Stephen (1994). "Considerations of the dating and geographical origins of the Mahavairocanabhisambodhi-sutra", The Buddhist forum, volume III; ed by T. Skorupski, pp. 57 – 83
- Snellgrove, David (2002). Indo-Tibetan Buddhism : Indian Buddhists and their Tibetan Successors, Boston: Shambala.
- Tajima, R. (1936; reprint : 1992), Étude sur le Mahāvairocana-sūtra (Dainichikyō), Paris: Adrien-Maisonneuve.
- Wayman, A and Tajima, R. (1998). The Enlightenment of Vairocana, Delhi: Motilal Banarsidass.
- Yamamoto, Chikyo. (1990). Mahāvairocana-Sūtra : translated into English from Ta-p’I-lu-che-na ch’eng-fo shen-pien chia-ch’ih ching, the Chinese version of Śubhakarasiṃha and I-hsing (AD 725) New Delhi: International Academy of Indian Culture.
- Yamasaki, T. (1988). Shingon: Japanese Esoteric Buddhism, Fresno, CA: Shingon Buddhist International Institute.
