= Śubhakarasiṃha =

Indian Buddhist monk and translator

Śubhakarasiṇha
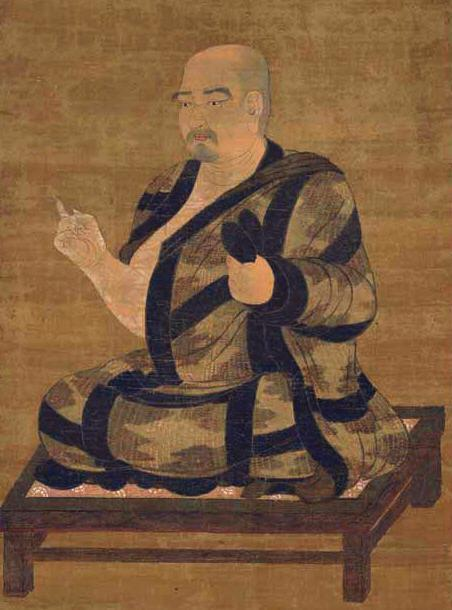
- Painting of Śubhakarasiṇha. Japan, Kamakura period (14th century)

Personal life
- Born: c. 637 CE
- Died: c. 735 CE
- Education: Nalanda

Religious life
- Religion: Buddhism
- School: Vajrayana

Senior posting
- Teacher: Dharmagupta

Śubhakarasiṇha (637–735 CE) (traditional Chinese: 善無畏; ; pinyin: Shànwúwèi; Japanese pronunciation: Zenmui; Korean: 선무외; romaja: Seonmuoe; Vietnamese: Thiện Vô Uý) was an eminent Indian Buddhist monk and translator of Esoteric Buddhist texts.

He originally studied in Nalanda monastery and later arrived in the Chinese capital Chang'an (now Xi'an) in 716 CE and translated the Mahāvairocana Abhisaṃbodhi Tantra, better known as the Mahāvairocana Sūtra. Four years later another master, Vajrabodhi (670–741 CE), and his pupil Amoghavajra (705–775 CE), would arrive and proceeded to translate other scriptures, thus establishing a second esoteric tradition. Along with these other masters, Śubhakarasiṃha was responsible for bringing Esoteric Buddhism to the height of its popularity in China.

== Biography ==
=== Origins ===
There are differing views regarding Śubhakarasiṇha's place of origin. According to Chinese sources, Śubhakarasiṇha was born in India as the oldest son of Buddhakara (Fo-shou Wang). Li Hua's Shan-wu-wei-hsing-chuang states that his family originated in Magadha in the statement: "[Śubhakarasiṇha] was a man of Magadha in Middle India, having resided at the monastery of Nalanda of the city Rājagrha.” His funeral stele also refers to him as "Late Tripiṭaka Upādhyāya Śubhakarasiṇha from Central India, Who Passed Away in the Great Shengshan Monastery in the Eastern Capital of the Great Tang" (大唐東都大聖善寺故中天竺國善無畏三藏和尚碑銘并序). Other scholars state that he was from Odisha and that his ancestors have arrived there following unrest in their original homeland in Central India. A theory has been put forward that Śubhakarasiṇha may have been an ancestor of the Bhauma-Kara dynasty, which ruled in Odisha between the 8th and 10th centuries, and whose kings included people named Śubhakara.

=== India ===
According to his biography, Śubhakarasiṇha ascended to the throne as king when he was thirteen years old. Although emerging victorious from a power struggle with his older brothers, he turned over his position to his oldest brother and entered the monastic life. He became well known for his supernatural abilities and finally settled in Nālandā where he met the master Dharmagupta. After being instructed by him and gaining the title of Tripiṭaka (Buddhist doctor), Śubhakarasiṇha became a travelling teacher and was then told by Dharmagupta to go further east to China.

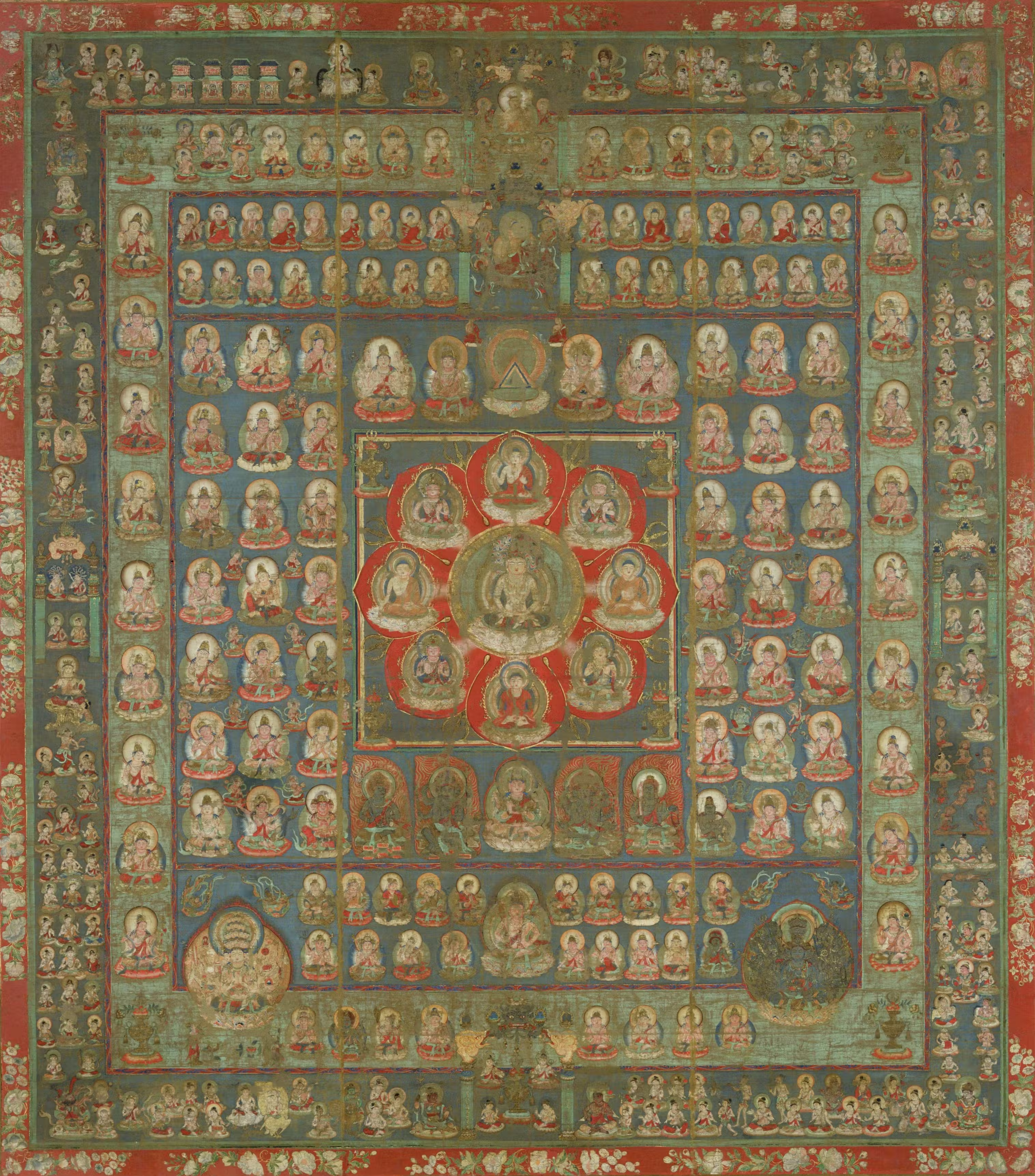
The Garbhadhātu maṇḍala used in Śubhakarasiṇha's teachings from the Mahāvairocana Tantra. Vairocana is located in the center.

=== Turk Shahis ===
While travelling to China, he went through the territory of the Turk Shahi kingdom around modern-day Kaśmīra and Afghanistan. Here he preached Buddhism to the Turks and this event was recorded in his stone stele inscription which was erected by his disciple, Li Hua:

Having passed by Kaśmīra, he (Śubhakarasiṇha) came across a river at night. As he tried to cross, there was no boat or bridge. Then he floated up into the air and got to the other side. A wealthy man asked him (to stay). Then, the Arhat came down and said to him: I am a saint of Hinayāna and you, High Priest, are a Bödhisattva who have entered the first bhumi. Then he gave his seat to the Arhat to venerate him. As he (Śubhakarasiṇha) offered him a splendid robe, the Arhat ascended into the sky and disappeared. Then he came to Uddiyana. There was a white mouse which was spinning the wheel and gathering donations everyday. As he lectured on vinaya in the court of the Turkish ruler, the Turkish queen requested him to teach the Law to her. While he sat quietly under the tree and med-itated, phrases of the Law appeared in the air in golden letters, which floated in the air in rows. When a courtier of the Turks rubbed her breast, milk flew into the air in three lines and poured into his mouth. He then joined his hands together in a dignified manner and said: This is my mother in a previous life. Someone cheated him (Śubhakarasiṇha) and, wielding a sword, cut him three times. But there was no wound on his body. The man with the sword only heard a metallic clank. Then he reached a big lake at the foot of Snowy Mountain.

=== China ===
Due to unstable conditions in Central India, Śubhakarasiṇha reached Chang’an in China via Tibet. When Śubhakarasiṇha arrived in China, he was already eighty years old and was carrying with him a variety of different manuscripts although the catalogue of what texts he brought with him has been lost. Upon his arrival, he became well known for his supposed supernatural abilities and became favoured by Emperor Xuanzong of the Tang dynasty. It was during this time that he translated several works of Esoteric Buddhism including the Mahāvairocana Abhisaṃbodhi Tantra. Emperor Xuanzong first invited him to Xingfu si but later reassigned him to Ximing si. From this point onwards he assembled a group of assistants to help him with the translations of the manuscripts that he brought with him. The Chinese hagiographies also praise his metallurgical skills and craftsmanship and state that he designed and modelled many Buddhist images and stupas.

According to Robert Sharf, Chán Master Yi Xing (Chinese: 一行禅師) was the most eminent of his students. Yixing belonged to the northern school of Chán Buddhism, but this was not seen by Chinese Buddhist culture as being fundamentally different from the esoteric teachings of Śubhakarasiṇha. Around the turn of the eighth century, the northern school was known for its esoteric practices of dhāraṇīs and mantras. Śubhakarasiṇha died in 735 CE and was posthumously bestowed with the title of "Court Director of State Ceremonial" (Honglu qing 鴻臚卿). He was buried in 740 CE in the hills nearby to Longmen Caves and the site of his burial became a place of reverence for at least 250 years after his death.

== Siddhis ==
After his death, many Chinese hagiographical sources on Śubhakarasiṇha's life began to place an emphasis on the supernatural feats or Siddhis that he was said to have performed during his lifetime. These include stories and legends of defeating monsters, dragons, serpents among others. Some of these stories also promoted his rainmaking abilities. One of these stories states:

Once there was a great drought in the summer and […] the officers showed him the implements used in making rain: banners, standards, conch-shells, and cymbals were all available. Śubhakarasiṇha laughed and said: “Those things can’t make rain. Have them removed quickly!” He filled a bowl with water, stirring it meanwhile with a small knife and reciting a Sanskrit dhāraṇī of several hundred syllables. Soon, an object, like a dragon, about the size of a finger and red in color, lifted its head above the surface of water, but dived back to the bottom of the bowl again. […] After a while, a white smoke rose from the bowl and went straight up into the air for several feet, and was slowly dissipated. Śubhakarasiṇha told Lishi [i.e. the eunuch who conveyed the Emperor’s request for rain praying]: “Hurry back to the palace. It is going to rain!” […] The Emperor later welcomed Śubhakarasiṇha with his head bending to the ground and thanked him repeatedly.

Other stories also detail how he used his siddhis to save the lives of other people:

He then found accommodation on a merchant ship […] The merchant’s lives were once in danger when they encountered pirates. Filled with compassion for his comrades, Śubhakarasiṇha silently whispered a dhāraṇī. Seven koṭis of deities appeared in full glory, and finally the pirates were destroyed by other bandits who appeared. These bandits then confessed their sin and became his disciples.

== In Shingon Buddhism ==
Śubhakarasiṇha was the first patriarch of the Shingon teachings in China. Following Śubhakarasiṇha, the lineage is traced to his student Chán Master Yixing, then to Huiguo (惠果), and finally to Kūkai (Japanese: 空海), who brought the teachings of Śubhakarasiṇha and his translation of the Mahāvairocana Abhisaṃbodhi Tantra to Japan.

== Works ==
A total of sixteen translations have been attributed to Śubhakarasiṃha. These texts range from initiation manuals as well as ritual manuals. Some examples of works he has translated include:

- Vairocanābhisaṃbodhi Sūtra
- Tattvasaṃgraha Tantra
- Susiddhikara Sūtra
- Uṣṇīṣa Vijaya Dhāraṇī Sūtra
