= Goki Eda =

Japanese researcher

- Born: Japan
- Education: Worcester Polytechnic Institute (M.Sc.), Rutgers University (Ph.D.)
- Known for: Research on Two-dimensional materials, Excitons
- Scientific career
- Fields: Materials Science, Physics, Chemistry
- Workplaces: National University of Singapore

Goki Eda (born February 25, 1981) is an associate professor at the National University of Singapore (NUS), where he holds positions in both the Department of Physics and the Department of Chemistry. Eda is a Newton International Fellow of the Royal Society in the UK.

== Research and contributions ==
Eda's research focuses on two-dimensional (2D) materials. His work spans several interdisciplinary fields, including condensed matter physics, materials chemistry, and quantum photonics.

One of his contributions is the study of excitons in 2D semiconductors. Additionally, Eda's research has explored the electrical control of magnetism in van der Waals ferromagnetic semiconductors.

== Awards and recognitions ==
- President's Science and Technology Young Scientist Award (2015)
- University Young Researcher Award (2015)
- Newton International Fellowship - Royal Society
- Materials Research Society (MRS) Young Investigator Award
- IEEE Nanotechnology Early Career Award
