= Genka calendar =

Japanese lunisolar calendar used from 604 to 680

The Genka calendar (元嘉暦, Genka-reki), also known as Yuan-chia li, was a Japanese lunisolar calendar (genka reki). It was used from 604 to 680.

== History ==
The calendar was created in 425 during the time of China's Southern and Northern Dynasties. It is named after (the translation of) the era in Chinese history.

The Genka-reki system was brought to Japan from Korea by a Buddhist monk. The earliest record of this calendar in Japan is in the 10th month of the 10th year of the reign of Empress Suiko (602), during the Asuka period of Japanese history.

Dates in the Nihon Shoki before the late 7th century were likely recorded using the Genka calendar system.

== See also ==
- Japanese calendar
- Sexagenary cycle
