= Pawo Tsuglag Threngwa =

Tibetan historian and Buddhist monk (1504–1566)

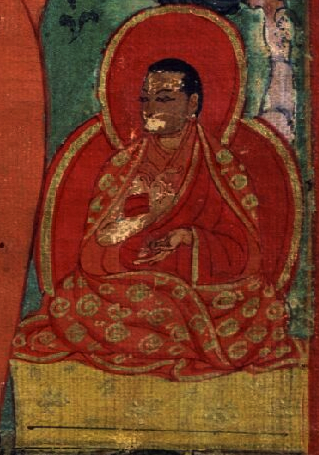

Personal life
- Born: 1504, the wood-mouse year of the eighth sexagenary cycle; father, Lama Dar (bla ma dar); mother, Lamnye Dolma (lam rnyed sgol ma). Ganggyu in Nyêtang (snye thang gi sgangs rgyud)
- Died: 1566, at dawn on the sixteenth day of the tenth month of the year of fire-tiger of the ninth sexagenary cycle (age 63)
- Notable work(s): mkhas pa'i dga' ston; a religious history of the Kagyu tradition, the Scholars Feast (chos 'byung khas pa'i dga' ston); works on history, medicine, astrology, general Buddhism
- Other names: Tsuglag Trengwa, Tsuklak Trengwa (dpa' bo 02 gtsug lag phreng ba)

Religious life
- Religion: Tibetan Buddhism
- School: Karma Kagyu
- Lineage: Nenang Pawo
- Dharma names: Pel Tsuklak Trengwa (dpal gtsug lag phreng ba)
- Monastic name: Mipam Chokyi Gyatso (mi pham chos kyi rgya mtsho)
- Profession: Historian
- Ordination: Vows of upasaka (dge bsnyen), primary monk (rab byung), and novice monk (dge tsul) at age 9; Full ordination (dge slong) at age 23
- Consecration: Enthroned to seat of the lineage, Lhodrak Drowolung Sekhar Gutok (Lhodrolung) Monastery

Senior posting
- Teacher: Dakpo Chokle Namgyel (dwags po phyogs las rnam rgyal, 1456–1539)
- Period in office: 1508–66
- Predecessor: First Pawo, Chowang Lhundrub (dpa' bo 01 chos dbang lhun grub, 1440/1455–1503)
- Reincarnation: First Pawo, Chowang Lhundrub (dpa' bo 01 chos dbang lhun grub, 1440/1455–1503)
- Students: Wangchuk Dorje, 9th Karmapa Lama, 5th Zhamar Konchok Yenlag, and 3rd Tsurpu Gyeltsab, Drakpa Peljor (mtshur phu rgyal tshab 03 grags pa dpal 'byor, 1519–1549)

Pawo Tsuglag Threngwa (Tibetan: དཔའ་བོ་གཙུག་ལག་ཕྲེང་བ།, Wylie: dpa' bo gtsug lag phreng ba) (1504–1566), the second Nenang Pawo, was a Tibetan historian of the Karma Kagyu. He was a disciple of Mikyö Dorje, 8th Karmapa Lama. He was the author of the famous mkhas pa'i dga' ston, A Scholar's Feast, addressing history of Buddhism in India and its spread in Tibet, as well as the history of Tibet.

Of Tsuklak Trengwa's many students, his chief disciples included the Ninth Karmapa Wangchuk Dorje, the Fifth Zhamar Konchok Yenlag, and the Third Tsurpu Gyeltsab, Drakpa Peljor (mtshur phu rgyal tshab 03 grags pa dpal 'byor, 1519–1549).

In 1565, a year before his death, he wrote a detailed commentary of the Bodhisattvacaryāvatāra (Wylie: gtsug lag ’grel chen).

His dharma histories were cited by the 4th Drikung Chetsang, Tenzin Peme Gyaltsen (1770–1826) in The Golden Garland of the Throne Lineage (Denrab Chöjung Serthreng, gdan rabs chos byung gser phreng).

== Works ==
- The Chojung Khepai Gaton, or Scholars Feast (chos 'byung khas pa'i dga' ston), a renowned Tibetan religious history of Buddhism in India and its diffusion in Tibet, with particular emphasis on the Karma Kagyu tradition.
- Works on history, medicine, astrology, general Buddhism
- Works in Worldcat
