= Tiphupa =

Tiphupa was an Indian Buddhist teacher from the 11th and 12th century who was considered to be the rebirth of Darma Dode, son and student of Tibetan lama Marpa Lotsawa. When young Darma Dode died in an accident his father with the special abilities of a realized lama, managed to prolong his son's life for a while. It was enough time for Marpa to teach him how to transfer his consciousness into a dead body – in this case the body of a dead pigeon. Following the detailed instructions of the teacher, the pigeon flew to India and died next to a sixteen-year-old boy who had recently lost his life. Transferring again his consciousness, this time to the young boy's body, gave life to the Indian teacher Tiphupa (from Ti Phu – pigeon). When the boy returned home it was evident that Tiphupa was very different from who he had been before. He kept taking care of his aging parents as a normal son and they considered him as a guru. Tiphupa intensively practiced the methods taught by Marpa and others, and methods he received in India from Naropa’s students and other masters with the result that he reached realization as a mahasiddha. He became a famous teacher himself and gave numerous teachings to Milarepa’s student Rechungpa. Probably the most important of them for the future of the Kagyu lineage was the "nine-fold cycle of the bodiless Dakinis".

== Literature ==
- The Life of Marpa the Translator. By Nalanda Translation Committee, Shambhala Publications, Inc. 1982. ISBN 1-57062-087-3, ISBN 1-56957-112-0
- Андросов В.П., Леонтьева Е.В. (2009). Марпа и история Карма Кагью. Жизнеописание Марпы переводчика в историческом контексте школы Карма Кагью. Россия: Открытый Мир. p. 512. ISBN 978-5-9743-0134-6.
