= Mahamudra =

Union of wisdom and emptiness

Seal design with the word Mahāmudrā ("great seal") in Mongolian 'Phags-pa script

Mahāmudrā (Sanskrit: महामुद्रा, Tibetan: ཕྱག་ཆེན་, Wylie: phyag chen, THL: chag-chen, contraction of Tibetan: ཕྱག་རྒྱ་ཆེན་པོ་, Wylie: phyag rgya chen po, THL: chag-gya chen-po) literally means "great seal" or "great imprint" and refers to the notion that "all phenomena inevitably are stamped by the fact of wisdom and emptiness inseparable". Mahāmudrā is a multivalent term of great importance in later Indian Buddhism and Tibetan Buddhism which "also occurs occasionally in Hindu and East Asian Buddhist esotericism."

The name also refers to a body of teachings representing the culmination of all the practices of the New Translation schools of Tibetan Buddhism, who believe it to be the quintessential message of all of their sacred texts. The practice of Mahāmudrā is also known as the teaching called "Sahajayoga" or "Co-emergence Yoga". In Tibetan Buddhism, particularly the Kagyu school, Sahaja Mahāmudrā is sometimes seen as a different Buddhist vehicle (yana), the "Sahajayana" (Tibetan: lhen chig kye pa), also known as the vehicle of self-liberation.

Jamgon Kongtrul, a Tibetan self-styled nonsectarian (THL: ri-mé) scholar, characterizes mahāmudrā as the path to realizing the "mind as it is" (Wylie: sems nyid) which also stands at the core of all Kagyu paths. He states, "In general, Mahāmudrā and everything below it are the ‘mind path’ " (Wylie: sems lam) Mahāmudrā traditionally refers to the quintessence of mind itself and the practice of meditation in relation to a true understanding of it.

== History ==
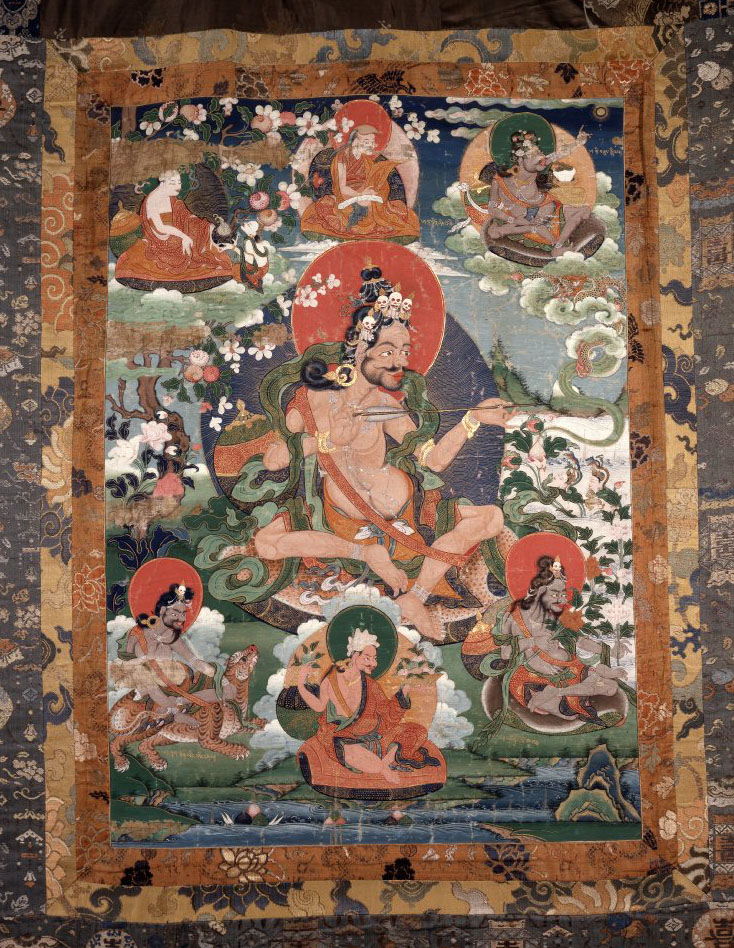
A scroll painting of Saraha, surrounded by other Mahāsiddhas, probably 18th century and now in the British Museum

The usage and meaning of the term mahāmudrā evolved over the course of hundreds of years of Indian and Tibetan history, and as a result, the term may refer variously to "a ritual hand-gesture, one of a sequence of 'seals' in Tantric practice, the nature of reality as emptiness, a meditation procedure focusing on the nature of Mind, an innate blissful gnosis cognizing emptiness nondually, or the supreme attainment of buddhahood at the culmination of the Tantric path."

According to Jamgon Kongtrul, the Indian theoretical sources of the mahāmudrā tradition are Yogacara and tathagatagarbha (buddha-nature) texts such as the Saṃdhinirmocana Sūtra and the Mahāyānottaratantraśāstra. The actual practice and lineage of mahāmudrā can be traced back to wandering mahasiddhas (great adepts) during the Indian Pala Dynasty (760-1142), beginning with the 8th century siddha Saraha.

Saraha's Dohas (songs or poems in rhyming couplets) are the earliest mahāmudrā literature extant, and promote some of the unique features of mahāmudrā such as the importance of pointing-out instruction by a guru, the non-dual nature of mind, and the negation of conventional means of achieving enlightenment such as samatha-vipasyana meditation, monasticism, rituals, tantric practices and doctrinal study in favor of more the direct methods of mahāmudrā 'non-meditation' and 'non-action'. These teachings also became the wellspring for the body of instructions eventually known as the mind teachings of Tibet associated with mahāmudrā of the Kagyu lineages. Later Indian and Tibetan masters such as Padmavajra, Tilopa, and Gampopa incorporated mahāmudrā into tantric, monastic and traditional meditative frameworks.

=== Etymology ===
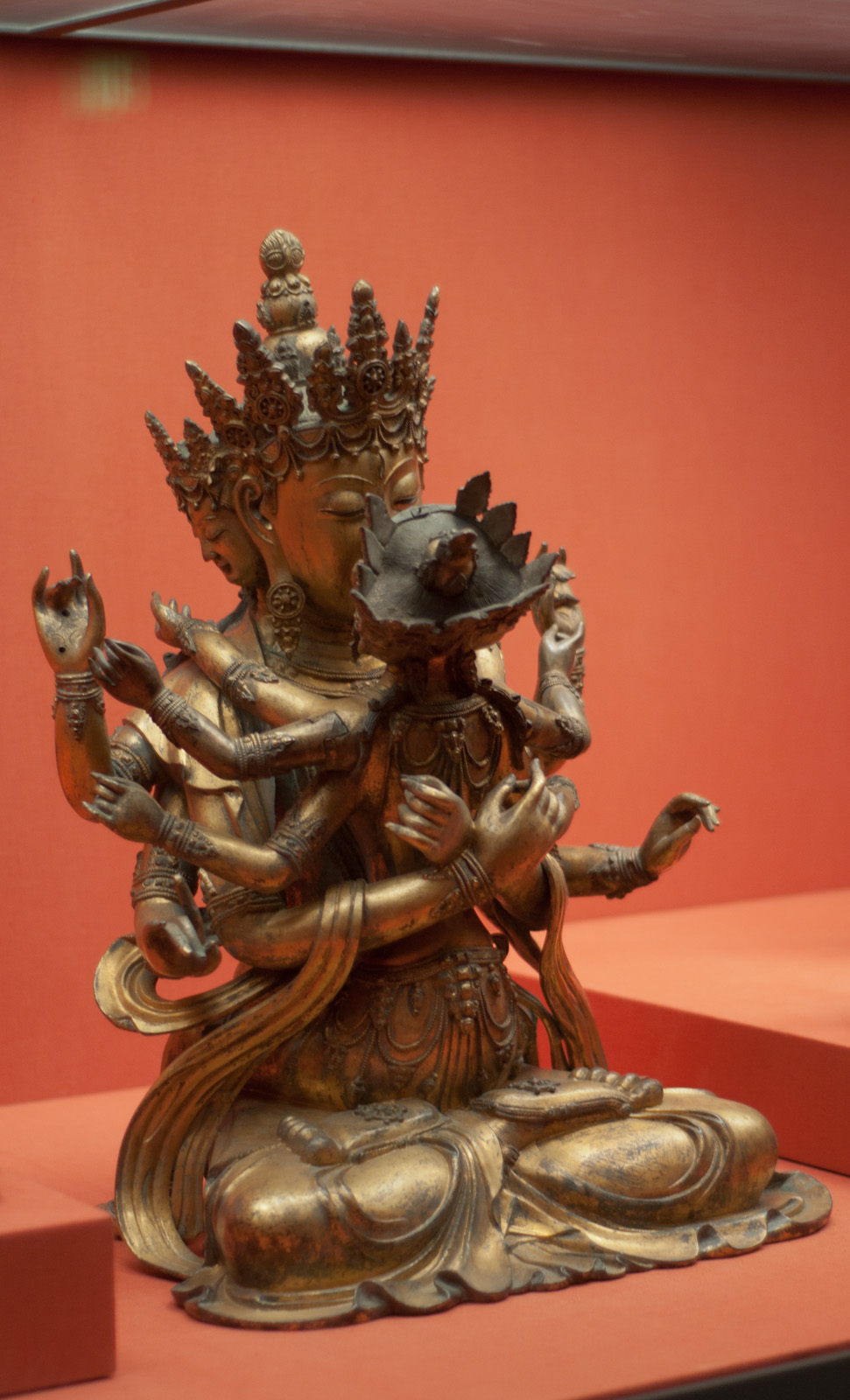
Statue of the Guhyasamāja deity in union with consort (his "mahāmudrā") performing various mudrās (ritual hand gestures).

It has been speculated that the first use of the term was in the c. 7th century Mañjuśrīmūlakalpa, in which it refers to a hand gesture.

The term is mentioned with increasing frequency as various Buddhist tantras developed further, particularly in the Yogatantras, where it appears in Tattvasaṁgraha (Compendium of Reality) and the Vajraśekhara (Vajra-peak). In these sources, "mahāmudrā" also denotes a hand gesture, now linked to three other hand mudrās—the action (karma), pledge (samaya), and dharma mudrās—but also involves "mantra recitations and visualizations that symbolize and help to effect one's complete identification with a deity's divine form or awakening Mind (bodhicitta)."

In Mahāyoga tantras such as the Guhyasamāja tantra, mahāmudrā "has multiple meanings, including a contemplation-recitation conducive to the adamantine body, speech, and Mind of the tathāgatas; and the object—emptiness—through realization of which 'all is accomplished,'" and it is also used as a synonym for awakened Mind, which is said to be "primordially unborn, empty, unarisen, nonexistent, devoid of self, naturally luminous, and immaculate like the sky."

The idea of "mahāmudrā" emerges as a central Buddhist concept in the Anuttarayoga Tantras (also known as Yoginītantras) like the Hevajra, Cakrasaṁvara, and Kālacakra.

According to Roger Jackson, in these tantras, mahāmudrā has multiple referents. It can refer to completion stage practices which work with forces in the subtle body (sūkṣma śarīra) to produce a divine form and "a luminous, blissful, nonconceptual gnosis." In this context, it is seen as the highest practice which transcends and perfects all previous ones and leads to a direct realization of the nature of mind. In the context of sexual yoga, mahāmudrā can also refers to a yogi's female consort. Furthermore, the term mahāmudrā can also refer to the ultimate truth and the ultimate realization (mahāmudrā-siddhī) in Buddhist tantra. As such, it is the "great seal" which marks all phenomena, i.e. Suchness (tathata), emptiness, the "unchanging bliss beyond object and subject, shape, thought, or expression".

The tantric scholar Aryadeva summarises the meaning of mahāmudrā as: "the discussion of how to attain mahāmudrā entails methods for meditating on Mind itself as something having voidness as its nature".

According to Reginald Ray, the term Mudrā denotes that in an adept's experience of reality, each phenomenon appears vividly, while the term Mahā ("great") refers to the fact that it is beyond concept, imagination, and projection.

== Indian sources ==
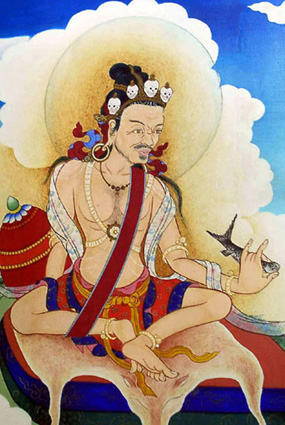
Tilopa

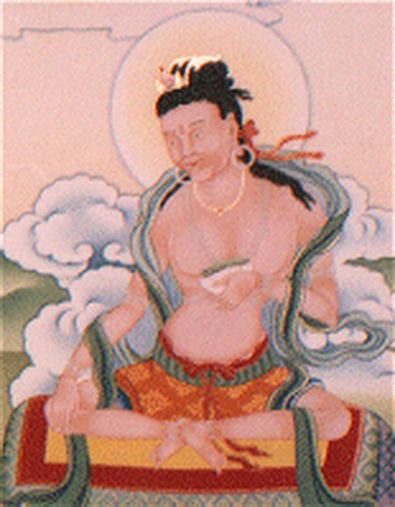
Maitripa

All of the various Tibetan mahāmudrā lineages originated with the Mahasiddhas of medieval India (c. 8th to 12th centuries). The earliest figure is the tenth century poet yogi Saraha, and his student Nagarjuna (this tantric figure not to be confused with the earlier philosopher Nagarjuna). Saraha's collections of poems and songs, mostly composed in the apabhramsa language are the earliest Indian sources for mahāmudrā teachings, aside from the Buddhist tantras.

Other influential Indian mahasiddhas include Tilopa, his student Naropa and Naropa's consort Niguma. Tilopa's Ganges Mahāmudrā song is a widely taught short mahāmudrā text. Niguma is an important source for the Shangpa Kagyu lineage.

Tilopa's pupil Maitripa (c. 1007–1085) became the principal master of mahāmudrā in India during his time and most lineages of mahāmudrā are traced from Maitripa. Maitripa was a very influential figure of the eleventh century, a scholar and tantrika who widely taught the Ratnagotravibhāga, a text which is widely seen as bridging the sutric Mahayana and Anuttarayogatantra views. He composed commentaries on the buddhist dohas, and his works include a collection of 26 texts on "non-conceptual realization" (amanasikara), which are a key Indian source of mahāmudrā teachings that blend sutra and tantra, and teach an instantaneous approach to awakening.

One of Maitripa's students was the Kadam scholar Atisha, who taught mahāmudrā to his pupil Dromtönpa (1004–63) who decided not to make mahāmudrā a part of the Kadam tradition. Another pupil of Maitripa, Marpa Lotsawa, also introduced mahāmudrā to Tibet and his disciple Milarepa is also a central figure of this lineage. Another important figure in the introduction of mahāmudrā to the area is Vajrapani, yet another student of Maitripa. His student, Asu, also was a teacher of Rechungpa (1084-1161), one of Milarepa's pupils.

Gampopa, a key figure of the Kagyu school, refers to three important cycles of Indian texts which discuss Mahāmudrā as his main sources:

- "The Seven [or eight] Siddhiḥ Texts" (Saptasiddhiḥ, Tib. Grub pa sde bdun), which include Padmavajra's Guhyasiddhi and Indrabhuti's Jñanasiddhi.
- "The Cycle of Six Heart Texts" or "Six works on essential meaning" (Snying po skor drug), including Saraha's Dohakosha and Nagarjunagarbha's Caturmudraniscaya.
- Maitripa's "Cycle of Teachings on Non-Cognition" (Yid la mi byed pa 'i chos skor).

This classification existed since the time of Butön Rinchen Drup (1290-1364).

Indian sources of mahāmudrā were later compiled by the seventh Karmapa Chödrak Gyatso (1454-1506) into a three-volume compilation entitled The Indian Mahāmudrā Treatises (Tib. Phyag rgya chen po 'i rgya gzhung). This compilation includes the above three collections, along with the Anavilatantra and texts that teach a non-tantric "instantaneous"approach to the practice by an Indian master named Śākyaśribhadra.

== Tibetan traditions ==
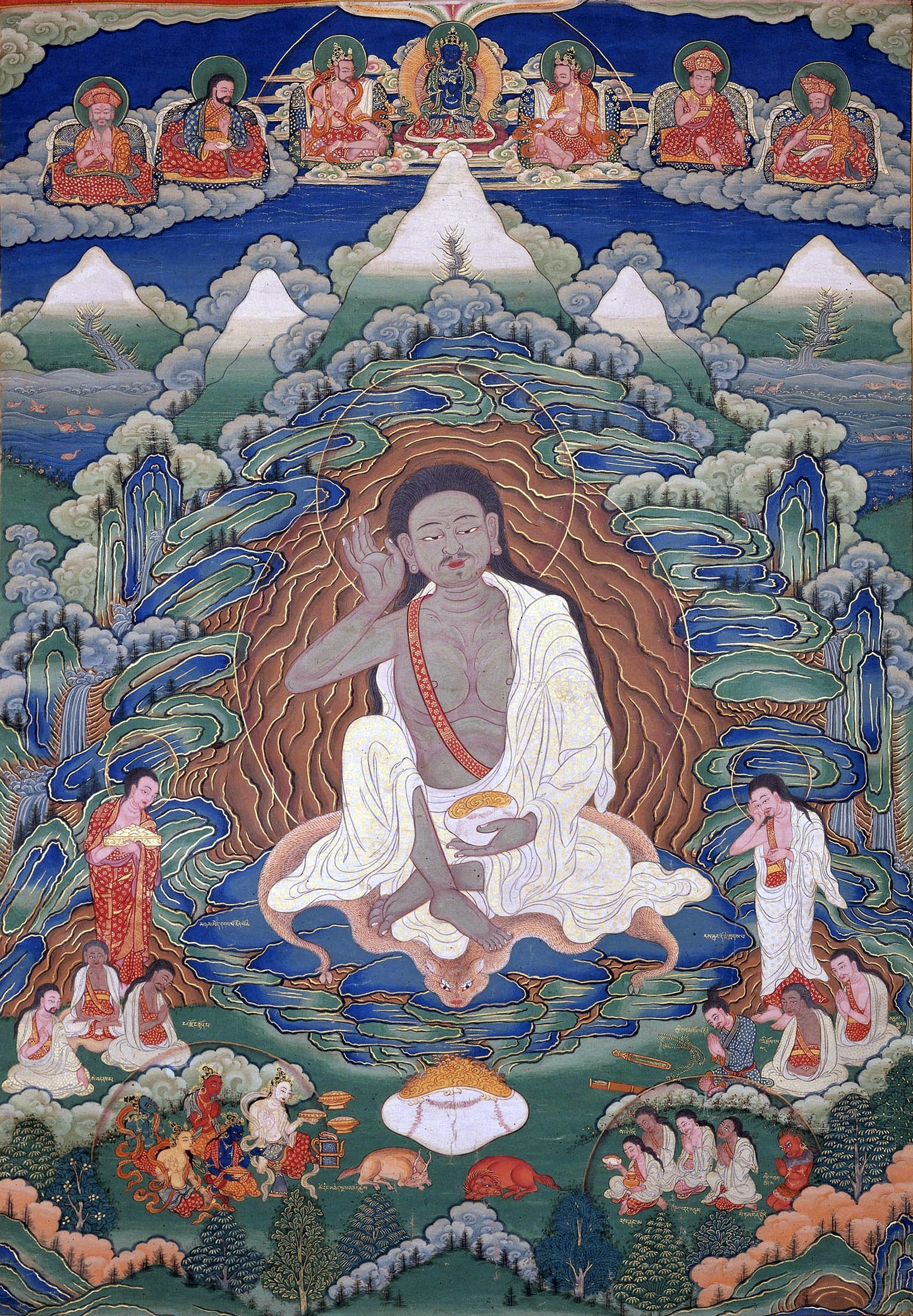
Painted thanka of Milarepa (1052-1135), Late 19th-early 20th Century, Dhodeydrag Gonpa, Thimphu, Bhutan

Mahāmudrā is most well known as a teaching within the Kagyu school of Tibetan Buddhism. However the Gelug and Sakya schools also practice mahāmudrā. The Nyingma school and Bon practise Dzogchen, a cognate but distinct method of direct introduction to the principle of śūnyatā. Nyingma students may also receive supplemental training in mahāmudrā, and the Palyul Nyingma lineage preserves a lineage of the "Union of mahāmudrā and Ati Yoga" originated by Karma Chagme.

=== Kagyu tradition ===
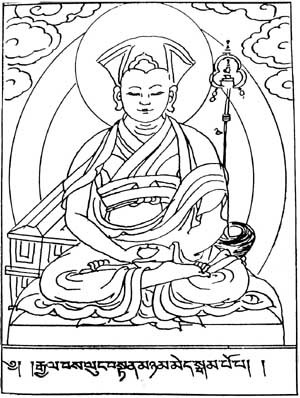
Gampopa (1079–1153), Kagyu founder

Gampopa Sönam Rinchen (1079-1153), a Kadam monk who was a student of the lay tantric yogi Milarepa, is a key figure in the Kagyu tradition. He is responsible for much of the development of Kagyu monastic institutions and for recording the teachings of the lineage in writing. He synthesized the Mahayana Kadam teachings with the tantric teachings he received from Milarepa and developed a unique system of mahāmudrā which he often taught without tantric empowerment, relying instead on guru yoga.

Mahāmudrā is defined by Gampopa as "the realization of the natural state as awareness-emptiness, absolutely clear and transparent, without root". Gampopa also states that mahāmudrā is "the paramita of wisdom, beyond thought and expression." Gampopa taught mahāmudrā in a five part system to his disciples, one of his most well known disciples, Phagmo Drupa (1110-1170) became a very successful teacher who continued to teach this five part system and eight "junior" kagyu lineages are traced to him. This "Five-Part Mahāmudrā" system became one of the main ways that Mahāmudrā was transmitted in Kagyu lineages after Gampopa.

The tradition which follows Gampopa is called Dakpo Kagyu. A key Mahāmudrā author of this tradition is Dakpo Tashi Namgyal, well known for his Mahāmudrā: The Moonlight. Karma Kagyu Karmapas like the ninth Karmapa Wangchuk Dorje also composed important Mahāmudrā texts. A development of these later mahāmudrā writers is the integration of the common Mahayana teachings on samatha and vipasyana as preliminaries to the practice of mahāmudrā.

==== Three types of teaching ====
The Kagyu lineage divides the mahāmudrā teachings into three types, "sutra mahāmudrā," "tantra mahāmudrā," and "essence mahāmudrā," in a formulation that appears to originate with Jamgon Kongtrul. Sutra mahāmudrā, as the name suggests, draws its philosophical view and meditation techniques from the sutrayana tradition. Tantric mahāmudrā employs such tantric techniques as tummo, dream yoga, and ösel, three of the Six Yogas of Naropa. Essence mahāmudrā is based on the direct instruction of a qualified lama, known as pointing-out instruction.

==== As a path beyond sutra and tantra ====
Kagyu lineage figures such as Gampopa presented a form of mahāmudrā that was said to transcend the vehicles of sutrayana and vajrayana. According to Karl Brunnhölzl, Gampopa saw Mahāmudrā as a third path that was neither sutra nor tantra which he called "the path of prajña" and "the path of suchness," and which "relies on blessing and is for those who are intelligent and of sharp faculties." Brunnhölzl adds that for Gampopa, the mahāmudrā path of "taking direct perceptions as the path" relies on introduction by a genuine guru to the luminous dharmakaya and thus:

Through having been taught an unmistaken instruction of definitive meaning like that, one then takes native mind as the path, without separating the triad of view, conduct, and meditation in terms of this connate mind about which one has gained certainty within oneself.

Gampopa also stated that mahāmudrā was "the highest path that actually transcends both sutra and tantra." Brunnhölzl further states that "In practice, most of Gampopa's preserved teachings consist primarily of sutra-based instructions and then conclude with Mahāmudrā, either not teaching the path of mantra at all or mentioning it only in passing."

The Kagyu tradition bases their mahāmudrā teachings on the works of Indian mahasiddhas like Saraha and Maitripa. According to Klaus-Dieter Mathes,

Later Bka´ brgyud pas defended their not specifically Tantric or sūtra mahāmudrā tradition by adducing Indian sources such as the Tattvadaśakaṭīkā or the Tattvāvatāra. These belong to a genre of literature which the Seventh Karmapa Chos grags rgya mtsho (1454–1506) called "Indian mahāmudrā-Works" (phyag chen rgya gzhung).

Mathes investigated the practice described in these mahāmudrā works and found that it is not necessarily Tantric. In Saraha's dohās, it is simply the realization of Mind's co-emergent nature with the help of a genuine guru. Maitrīpa (ca. 1007–1085) uses the term Mahāmudrā for precisely such an approach, thus employing an originally Tantric term for something that is not a specifically Tantric practice. It is thus legitimate for later Kagyupas to speak of Saraha's mahāmudrā tradition as being originally independent of the Sūtras and the Tantras. For Maitrīpa, the direct realization of emptiness (or the co-emergent) is the bridging link between the Sūtras and the Tantras, and it is thanks to this bridge that mahāmudrā can be linked to the Sūtras and the Tantras. In the Sūtras it takes the form of the practice of non-abiding and becoming mentally disengaged, while in the Tantras it occupies a special position among the four mudrās.

The Kagyu teachings of mahāmudrā became a point of controversy. The possibility of sudden liberating realization and the practice of mahāmudrā without the need for tantric initiation was seen as contrary to the teachings of the Buddhist tantras and as being just a form of Chinese Chan (Zen) by certain critics. However, Dakpo Tashi Namgyal explicitly reaffirms that a tantric empowerment is not, in and of itself, a requirement for the path of liberation. He writes, "(Gampopa) did not make the esoteric empowerment a prerequisite for receiving the Mahāmudrā teachings. He spoke about the method of directly guiding the disciple toward the intrinsic reality of the mind [...] if one follows venerable Gampopa’s system in elucidating Mahāmudrā alone, it is not necessary [...]" In addition, he notes certain "[...] followers of this meditative order (who later) adapted Mahāmudrā to the practice of esoteric tantra", which typically relies on empowerments.

==== Kagyu lineages ====
Khedrup Gelek Pelzang, 1st Panchen Lama identified a number of mahāmudrā lineages, according to their main practices for achieving mahāmudrā. In his teachings on the First Panchen Lama's root text and auto-commentary the 14th Dalai Lama delineated the Kagyu practice lineages as follows:

- The Karma Kagyu "Simultaneously Arising as Merged" tradition - This is the tradition introduced by Gampopa with a main practice of the Six Yogas of Naropa.
- The Shangpa Kagyu "Amulet Box" tradition - This tradition came from Khyungpo Naljor and its main practice is the Six yogas of Niguma.
- The Drikung Kagyu "Possessing Five" tradition - Jigten Gonpo founded the school and mahāmudrā lineage whose main practice is known as the fivefold mahāmudrā consisting of refuge and bodhicitta, deity yoga, guru yoga, mahamudra meditation, and dedication of merit.
- The Drukpa lineage "Six Spheres of Equal Taste" tradition - Tsangpa Gyare founded this tradition which encompasses a range of practices, including the Six Yogas of Naropa.
- The Dagpo Kagyu "Four Syllables" tradition - This is the tradition that derives from Maitripa. The four syllables are a-ma-na-si which make up the Sanskrit word meaning 'not to take to mind' and passed through the Dagpo Kagyu branches, i.e. any that descend from the teachings of Tilopa rather than those of Niguma, which in practice means all but the Shangpa Kagyu.

=== Sakya tradition ===
Following the great Sakya exegete and philosopher Sakya pandita (1182-1251), mahāmudrā in the Sakya school is seen as the highest tantric realization, which means that mahāmudrā practice is only taken on after having been initiated into tantric practice and practicing the creation and completion stages of deity yoga. In his "A Clear Differentiation of the Three Codes" (Sdom gsum rab dbye), Sakya Pandita criticized the non-tantric "sutra" mahamudra approaches of the Kagyu teachers such as Gampopa who taught mahāmudrā to those who had not received tantric initiations and based themselves on the Uttaratantrasastra. He argued that the term mahāmudrā does not occur in the sutras, only in the highest class of tantras and that only through tantric initiation does mahāmudrā arise: "Our own Great Seal consists of Gnosis risen from initiation." According to Sakya Pandita, through the four empowerments or initiations given by a qualified guru, most practitioners will experience a likeness of true mahāmudrā, though a few rare individuals experience true mahāmudrā. Through the practice of the creation and completion stages of tantra, the tantrika develops this partial understanding of bliss and emptiness into a completely non-dual gnosis, the real Mahamudra, which corresponds to the attainment of the Path of Seeing, the first Bodhisattva bhumi.

In Sakya, this insight known as mahāmudrā is described variously as "the unity of lucidity and emptiness, the unity of awareness and emptiness, the unity of bliss and emptiness" and also "the natural reality (chos nyid gnyug ma) which is emptiness possessing the excellence of all aspects."

=== Gelug tradition ===
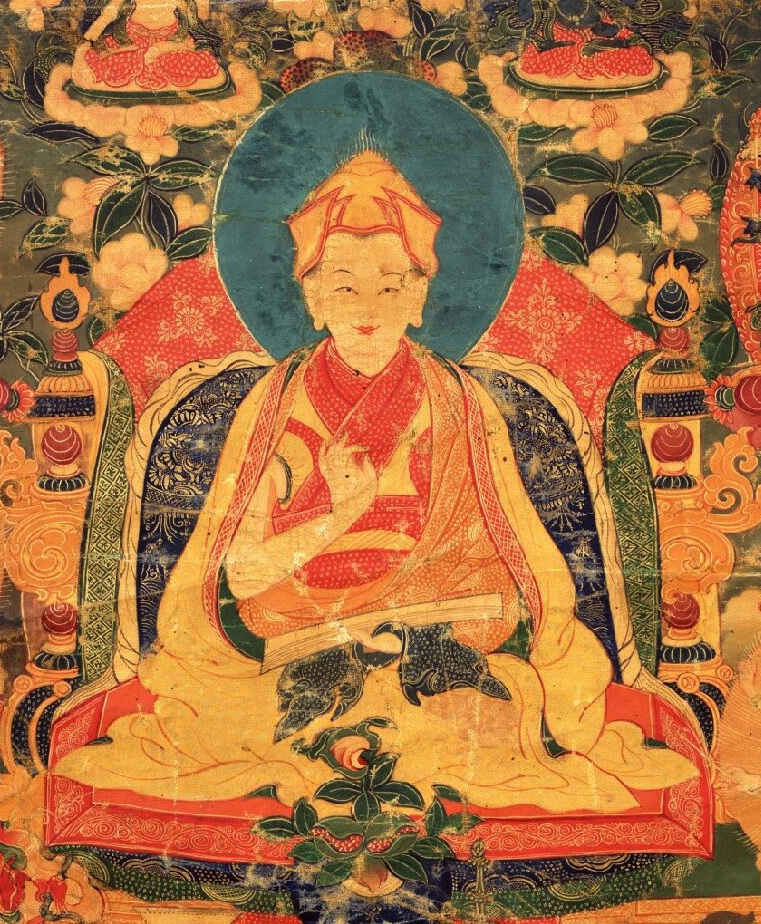
The 4th Panchen Lama, Lobsang Chökyi Gyaltsen

The Gelug school's mahamudra tradition is traditionally traced back to the school's founder Je Tsongkhapa (1357-1419), who was said to have received oral transmission from Manjushri, and it is also traced to the Indian masters like Saraha through the Drikung Kagyu master Chennga Chokyi Gyalpo who transmitted Kagyu Mahamudra teachings (probably the five-fold Mahamudra) to Tsongkhapa. Jagchen Jampa Pal (1310-1391), a holder of the 'jag pa tradition of the Shangpa teachings, was also one of the teachers of Tsongkhapa.

However, a specifically "Gelug" Mahamudra system was only recorded at the time of Lobsang Chökyi Gyaltsen, 4th Panchen Lama (sometimes named the "1st Panchen Lama", 1570–1662), who wrote a root Mahamudra text on the "Highway of the Conquerors: Root Verses for the Precious Geden [Gelug] Kagyu [Oral] Transmission of Mahāmudrā" (dGe-ldan bka'-brgyud rin-po-che'i phyag-chen rtsa-ba rgyal-ba'i gzhung-lam) and its auto commentary (the Yang gsal sgron me, "Lamp re-illuminating Mahamudra"), which is still widely taught and commented upon. Before this work, Gelug writings on Mahamudra tended to follow orthodox Kagyu teachings. This text and its auto commentary have become a central work on Mahamudra in the Gelug school. The current 14th Dalai Lama and Lama Thubten Yeshe are some of the modern Gelug figures which have written commentaries on this key Gelug Mahamudra text.

The Panchen Lama Chökyi Gyaltsen, himself was influenced by Kagyu teachings, and wished to imitate great siddhas like Milarepa and Sabaripa. He names various Mahamudra and Dzogchen lineages in his text, and comes to the conclusion that "their definitive meanings are all seen to come to the same intended point." Chökyi Gyaltsen also sides with the Kagyu school against Sakya, arguing that there is a sutra level of Mahamudra. However, in his account, sutra Mahamudra is particularly associated with a gradual path and his presentation of insight practice (vipasyana) is uniquely Gelug.

Yongdzin Yeshe Gyaltsen (also known as Khachen Yeshe Gyaltsen, tutor of the 8th Dalai Lama, 1713–1793) composed a commentary on Chökyi Gyaltsen's Mahamudra text, entitled "The Lamp of the Clear and Excellent Path of the Oral Tradition Lineage" (Yongs-'dzin ye shes rgyal mtshan). He also comments on Mahamudra in the context of Lama Chopa Guru Yoga.

Tibetan teacher Thubten Yeshe explains: "Mahāmudrā means absolute seal, totality, unchangeability. Sealing something implies that you cannot destroy it. Mahāmudrā was not created or invented by anybody; therefore it cannot be destroyed. It is absolute reality".

== Practices and methods ==
A common schema used in the Kagyu school is that of Ground (buddha-nature, emptiness), Path (practice) and Fruition mahāmudrā (Buddhahood). The advice and guidance of a qualified teacher (lama) or guru is considered to be very important in developing faith and interest in the Dharma as well as in learning and practicing mahāmudrā meditation. Most often mahāmudrā (particularly essence mahāmudrā) is preceded by meeting with a teacher and receiving pointing-out instruction. Some parts of the transmission are done verbally and through empowerments and "reading transmissions." A mahāmudrā student typically goes through various tantric practices before undertaking the "formless" practices described below; the latter are classified as part of "essence mahāmudrā."

Ngondro are the preliminary practices common to both Mahāmudrā and Dzogchen traditions and include practices such as contemplating the "four thoughts that turn the mind", prostrations, and guru yoga. According to one scholar, most people have difficulty beginning directly with formless practices and lose enthusiasm doing so, so the tantric practices work as a complement to the formless ones. Others develop a sincere and strong interest in the mahāmudrā teachings on the nature of mind, but find themselves quite resistant to the path of tantra and its empowerments. Regardless of how one proceeds, it is regarded to be of great benefit to study and practice in reliance upon the lineage’s treasured quintessential instructions.

Another way to divide the practice of mahāmudrā is between the tantric mahāmudrā practices and the sutra practices. Tantric mahāmudrā practices involves practicing deity yoga with a yidam as well as subtle body practices like the six yogas of Naropa and can only be done after empowerment. After the preliminary practices, the Kagyu school's sutra mahāmudrā practice is often divided into the ordinary or essential meditation practices and the extraordinary meditation practices. The ordinary practices are samatha (calming) and vipasyana (special insight). The extraordinary practices include "formless" practices like 'one taste yoga' and 'non-meditation'. The tradition also culminates with certain special enlightenment and post-enlightenment practices.

According to Reginald Ray, the "formless" practices, also called "Essence mahamudra," is when "one engages directly in practices of abandoning discursive thinking and resting the mind in the clear, luminous awareness that is mahamudra." The reason that preparatory practices and "form" practices like deity yoga and vipasyana are needed is because formless practices are quite difficult and subtle, and most practitioners are not able to enter into the simple essence of mind successfully without considerable mental preparation.

=== Four yogas and five paths ===
In the Dagpo Kagyu tradition as presented by Dagpo Tashi Namgyal, Mahāmudrā is divided into four distinct phases known as the four yogas of mahāmudrā (S. catvāri mahāmudrā yoga, Tibetan: ཕྱག་རྒྱ་ཆེན་པོའི་རྣལ་འབྱོར་བཞི།, Wylie: phyag rgya chen po'i rnal 'byor bzhi). They are as follows:

1. one-pointedness (S. ekāgra, T. རྩེ་གཅིག་ rtse gcig);
2. simplicity (S. niṣprapānca, T. སྤྲོས་བྲལ་ spros bral), "free from complexity" or "not elaborate;"
3. one taste (S. samarasa, T. རོ་གཅིག་ ro gcig);
4. non-meditation (S. abhāvanā, T. སྒོམ་མེད་ sgom med), the state of not holding to either an object of meditation nor to a meditator. Nothing further needs to be 'meditated upon' or 'cultivated' at this stage.

These stages parallel the four yogas of Dzogchen semde. The four yogas of mahāmudrā have been correlated with the Mahāyāna five paths (S. pañcamārga), according to Tsele Natsok Rangdrol (Lamp of Mahāmudrā):

- Outer and inner preliminary practices: the path of accumulation
- One-pointedness: the path of application
- Simplicity: the path of seeing and most of the path of meditation (bhūmis one through six)
- One taste: the last part of the path of meditation, most of the path of no-more-learning (bhūmis seven through nine)
- Nonmeditation: the last part of the path of no-more learning (tenth bhūmi) and buddhahood (bhūmis eleven through thirteen)

Dakpo Tashi Namgyal meanwhile in his Moonlight of Mahāmudrā correlates them as follows:

- Outer and inner preliminary practices and one-pointedness: the path of accumulation
- Simplicity: the path of application
- One taste: the paths of meditation & no-more-learning
- Nonmeditation: the path of no more learning & buddhahood.

According to Je Gyare as reported by Dakpo Tashi Namgyal (Moonlight of Mahāmudrā):

- One-pointedness: paths of accumulation and application
- Simplicity: path of seeing (first bhūmi)
- One taste: paths of meditation and part of the path no-more-learning (bhūmis two through eight)
- Nonmeditation: rest of path of no-more-learning, buddhahood (bhūmis nine through thirteen)

According to Drelpa Dönsal as reported by Dakpo Tashi Namgyal (Moonlight of Mahāmudrā):

- One-pointedness: paths of accumulation and application
- Simplicity: path of seeing (first bhūmi)
- One taste: paths of meditation and no-more-learning (bhūmis two through ten)
- Nonmeditation: buddhahood (bhūmis eleven through thirteen)

=== Ordinary meditation practices ===
As in most Buddhist schools of meditation, the basic meditative practice of mahāmudrā is divided into two approaches: śamatha ("tranquility","calm abiding") and vipaśyanā ("special insight"). This division is contained in the instructions given by Wangchuk Dorje, the ninth Karmapa, in a series of texts he composed; these epitomize teachings given on mahāmudrā practice.

==== Śamatha ====
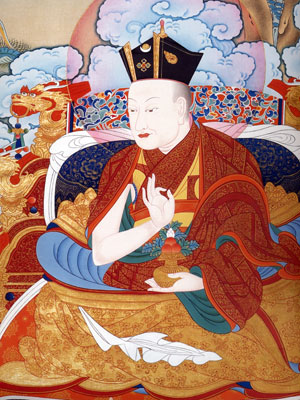
Wangchuk Dorje (1556–1603), 9th Karmapa, composed various influential texts on Mahamudra.

Often associated with the yoga of one-pointedness, mahāmudrā śamatha contains instructions on ways to sit with proper posture, called the seven point posture of Vairocana. The mahāmudrā shamatha teachings also include instructions on how to work with a mind that is beset with various impediments to focusing, such as raising the gaze when one feels dull or sleepy, and lowering it again when one feels overly excited. Two types of mahāmudrā śamatha are generally taught: śamatha with support and śamatha without support.

Mahāmudrā śamatha with support involves the use of an object of attention to which the meditator continually returns his or her attention. Wangchuk Dorje mentions that one can use a wide variety of supports, visual objects like a candle flame, but also sounds, a smell, etc.

One of the main techniques involved in Mahāmudrā śamatha with support is mindfulness of breathing (Sanskrit: ānāpānasmṛti; Pali: ānāpānasati). Mindfulness of breathing practice is considered to be a profound means of calming the mind to prepare it for the stages that follow. For the Kagyupa, in the context of mahāmudrā, mindfulness of breathing is thought to be the ideal way for the meditator to transition into taking the mind itself as the object of meditation and generating vipaśyanā on that basis. The contemporary Kagyu/Nyingma master Chogyam Trungpa, expressing the Kagyu Mahāmudrā view, wrote, "your breathing is the closest you can come to a picture of your mind. It is the portrait of your mind in some sense... The traditional recommendation in the lineage of meditators that developed in the Kagyu-Nyingma tradition is based on the idea of mixing mind and breath."

Śamatha without support or objectless meditation refers to resting the mind without the use of a specific focal point or object of concentration. According to Reginald Ray, in this practice "the eyes are open and one gazes straight ahead into space, directing one's mind to nothing at all."

In Gelug sutra mahāmudrā, the śamatha techniques are similar to the Kagyu presentation.

==== Vipaśyanā ====
The detailed instructions for the insight practices are what make Mahāmudrā (and Dzogchen) unique in Tibetan Buddhism. In Mahāmudrā vipaśyanā, Wangchuck Dorje gives ten separate contemplations that are used to disclose the essential mind within; five practices of "looking at" and five of "pointing out" the nature of mind. They all presume some level of stillness cultivated by mahāmudrā shamatha. In retreat, each contemplation would typically be assigned specific time periods.

The five practices for "looking at" the nature of the mind are as follows:

- Looking at the settled mind. One repeatedly looks at the mind's still state, possibly posing questions to arouse awareness, such as "what is its nature? It is perfectly still?"
- Looking at the moving or thinking mind. One tries to closely examine the arising, existence, and ceasing of thoughts, possibly posing oneself questions so as to better understand this process, such as "how does it arise? What is its nature?"
- Looking at the mind reflecting appearances. One looks at the way in which phenomena of the external senses occur in experience. Usually, a visual object is taken as the subject. One repeatedly looks at the object, trying to see just how that appearance arises in the mind, and understand the nature of this process. One possibly asks questions such as "what is their nature? How do they arise, dwell, and disappear? Is their initial appearance different from how they eventually understood?"
- Looking at the mind in relation to the body. One investigates questions such as "what is the mind? What is the body? Is the body our sensations? What is the relation of our sensations to our mental image of our body?"
- Looking at the settled and moving minds together. When the mind is still, one looks at that, and when the mind is in motion, one looks at that. One investigates whether these two stages are the same or different, asking questions such as "if they are the same, what is the commonality? If different, what is the difference?"

The practices for "pointing out the nature of mind" build on these. One now looks again at each of the five, but this time repeatedly asks oneself "What is it?" In these practices, one attempts to recognize and realize the exact nature of, respectively:

- The settled mind,
- The moving or thinking mind,
- The mind reflecting appearances,
- The relation of mind and body,
- The settled and thinking mind together.

The above practices do not have specific "answers"; they serve to provoke one to scrutinize experience more and more closely over time, seeking to understand what is really there.

Gelug sutra Mahāmudrā, as presented by Chökyi Gyaltsen, practices a unique Gelug style of doing vipaśyanā, based primarily on Gelug Madhyamaka. According to Roger Jackson:

In an actual meditation session, this involves, first of all, analyzing whether the meditator who has achieved tranquil equipoise actually can be found in an ultimate sense. Seeking the meditator both within and apart from the various elements, one encounters the meditator nowhere; seeking ultimacy in phenomena (dharmas), one encounters it nowhere. Thus, one comes to abide in a space-like awareness of the void nature of both the person and dharmas. Next (or, alternatively) one examines more carefully whether the mind itself can be found in an ultimate sense: it is discovered to have the conventional nature of a flow of awareness and clarity, but no ultimacy, no true existence. In short, one should recognize that any existent that arises, whether an object of the mind or the mind itself, is merely conceptual, is void and—as Chos rgyan quotes his guru, Sangs rgyas ye shes, as saying—"When . . . you are equipoised one-pointedly on that, marvelous!" (GBZL: 4a; trans. Dalai Lama and Berzin: 100; YSGM: 30b). In the period between meditation sessions (rjes thob), one should see all appearances as deceptive (sgyu ma), as existing differently than they appear, but one must at the same time recognize that their ultimate voidness does not preclude their conventional functioning, any more than conventional functioning gives them true existence.

=== Extraordinary meditation practices ===
The practice of ordinary meditation eventually leads one to the yoga of simplicity, which according to Gampopa, is "understanding the essential state of that awareness [of one-pointedness] as nonarising [emptiness], which transcends conceptual modes of reality and unreality." One sees all phenomena just as they are, non-conceptually, beyond extremes of existence and non-existence.

==== One taste ====
According to Gampopa, the yoga of one taste is "understanding diverse appearances as being one, from the standpoint of their intrinsic nature."

Phagmo Drupa says:

By meditating on the one taste of all things, the meditator will cognize the one taste of all these things. The diversity of appearances and nonappearances, mind and emptiness, emptiness and non-emptiness, Are all of one taste, undifferentiable in their intrinsic emptiness. Understanding and lack of understanding are of one taste; Meditation and nonmeditation are nondifferentiable; Meditation and absence of meditation are unified into one taste; Discrimination and lack of discrimination are one taste In the expanse of reality.

==== Nonmeditation ====
Gampopa states that nonmeditation is "an unceasing realization of the union of appearance and its intrinsic emptiness."

Phagmo Drupa says:

By perfecting this [nonmeditation] stage the meditator attains naked, unsupported awareness. This nondiscriminatory awareness is the meditation! By transcending the duality of meditation and meditator, external and internal realities, the meditating awareness dissolves itself into its luminous clarity. Transcending the intellect, it is without the duality of meditation and post-meditation. Such is the quintessence of mind.

== Main source texts ==
The major source texts for the Indo-Tibetan Mahamudra tradition found in the Tibetan Buddhist canon (editions: D = Derge Kanjur, Q = Qianlong Kanjur, P = Peking Kanjur) include the following:

=== Indian works ===
- The Ratnagotravibhaga and associated commentaries
- Anāvilatantra (The Stainless Tantra) and Kumāracandra's commentary. This is the only tantra which is part of the compilation of Mahamudra works.
- Saraha's Dohas and other poetry (circa 8th century CE).
- Tilopa's (988–1069) Ganges Mahamudra
- "The Seven [or eight] Siddhiḥ Texts" (Saptasiddhiḥ, Tib. Grub pa sde bdun):
  - Padmavajra's Guhyasiddhi (Q306 1, D2217);
  - Anangavajra's Prajñopayaviniscayasiddhi (Q3062, D22 l 8);
  - Indrabhuti's Jñanasiddhi (Q3063, D22 1 9);
  - Laksmi's Advayasiddhi (Q3064, D2220);
  - Ulavajra's Vyaktabhavasiddhi;
  - Darika's Mahaguhyatattvopadesa (Q3065, D222 1);
  - Sahajayogini Cinta's Vyaktabhavanugatatattvasiddhi (Q3066, D2222);
  - Dombhi Heruka's Sahajasiddhi (Q3067, D2223).
- "The Cycle of Six Heart Texts" or "Six works on essential meaning" (Snying po skor drug):
  - Saraha's Dohakosagiti (D 2224, p 3068)
  - Nagarjuna's Caturmudranvaya (D 2225, P 3069)
  - Aryadeva's Cittavaranavisodhana (D 1 804, P 2669)
  - Divakaracandra's Prajñajñanaprakasa (D 2226, P 3070)
  - Sahajavajra's Sthitisamasa (D 2227, P 307 1)
  - Kotali's Acintyakramopadesa (D 2228, P 3072).
- Maitripa's cycle of [26] texts on non-conceptual realization (amanasikara).

=== Tibetan works ===
- Milarepa's The Hundred Thousand Songs
- Gampopa (1079–1153) – Numerous texts of the Dags po 'i bka ' 'bum (Manifold Sayings of Dagpo)
- Phagmo Drupa (1110–1170) – Verses on the Fivefold Path
- Jigten Sumgon (1143–1217) –The Source of the Jewels of Experience and Realization, The Ocean-Like Instruction on the Five Parts and Song of the Five Profound Paths of Mahamudra
- Rangjung Dorje, 3rd Karmapa Lama (1284–1339) – Aspiration Prayer of Mahāmudrā
- Khedrup Gelek Pelzang, 1st Panchen Lama (1385–1438 CE) – A Root Text for the Precious Gelug/Kagyü Tradition of Mahamudra
- Gyalwang Kunga Rinchen (1475–1527) – Clarifying the Jewel Rosary of the Fivefold Profound Path
- Lobsang Chökyi Gyaltsen, 4th Panchen Lama (1570–1662) – Highway of the Conquerors
- Wangchuk Dorje, 9th Karmapa Lama (1556–1603) – Pointing Out the Dharmakaya (Wylie: chos sku mdzub tshugs); An Ocean of the Definite Meaning (Wylie: nges don rgya mtsho) and Eliminating the Darkness of Ignorance
- Tsele Natsok Rangdröl – Lamp of Mahāmudrā
- Kunkhyen Pema Karpo (1527–1592 CE) – Practice Guidelines of the Simultaneous School of Mahamudra, The Oral transmission of the Six Cycles of Same Taste: Rolled into a ball [Path walking] instructions and "Mind Harvest", An instruction on the Five-Part Mahamudra
- Dagpo Tashi Namgyal (16th century) – Clarifying the Natural State and Moonlight of Mahāmudrā
- Karma Chagme (1613–1678) – Meaningful to Behold
- Situ Panchen (1700–1774) – Commentary on the Third Karmapa's Mahamudra Prayer
- Jamgon Kongtrul (1813–1899) – A Treasury of Instructions and Techniques for Spiritual Realization and Torch of certainty

=== Six Words of Advice ===
Tilopa was a Bengali mahasiddha who developed the mahāmudrā method around 1,000 C.E. Tilopa gave Naropa, his successor, a teaching on mahāmudrā meditation called the Six Words of Advice.

In the following chart a translation is given of the Tilopa's Six Words of Advice.

Six Words of Advice
	First short, literal translation	Later long, explanatory translation	Tibetan (Wylie transliteration)
1	Don't recall	Let go of what has passed	mi mno
2	Don't imagine	Let go of what may come	mi bsam
3	Don't think	Let go of what is happening now	mi shes
4	Don't examine	Don't try to figure anything out	mi dpyod
5	Don't control	Don't try to make anything happen	mi sgom
6	Rest	Relax, right now, and rest	rang sar bzhag

== See also ==
- Body of light – Hermetic starfire body
- Buddhist meditation
- Chöd – Buddhist religious practice
- Dhyāna in Buddhism – Training of the mind through meditation in Buddhism
