= Mikyo =

Mikyo

- Mikyö Dorje, eighth Gyalwa Karmapa, head of the Kagyu School of Tibetan Buddhism
- An alternate transliteration of Miko
