= Nenang Pawo =

Lama of the Karma Kagyu school of Tibetan Buddhism

Tibetan name
- Tibetan: གནས་ནང་དཔའ་བོ་
Transcriptions
- Wylie: gnas nang dpa' bo

Nenang Pawo is one of the highest lamas of the Karma Kagyu school of Tibetan Buddhism. The Pawos form a lineage of tulkus, of which the first was born in 1440. They were traditionally the heads of Nenang Monastery in Ü-Tsang.

== Recent Pawos ==
The 10th Pawo, Tsuglag Mawey Wangchuk, lived from 1912 to 1991. He was recognised by Khakyab Dorje, 15th Gyalwang Karmapa. After completing the traditional education of a reincarnate lama followed by a period of meditative retreat, he became one of the teachers of Rangjung Rigpe Dorje, 16th Karmapa.

Pawo Rinpoche fled Tibet during the uprising against Chinese Communist rule in 1959, travelling to Bhutan and then on the Kalimpong in India. At the request of the Dalai Lama, Pawo Rinpoche served as an instructor at the Sanskrit University in Varanasi from 1962 until 1966. In 1975, he travelled in Western countries, establishing his Western seat in France where he lived permanently (1978–1986). In 1986 he established a new Nenang, Nénang Püntsok Monastery (Wylie: gnas nang phun tshogs chos gling), near Boudhanath in Nepal, where he resided for the remainder of his life.

In 1994, the 11th Nenang Pawo, while still an infant, was recognised by the Seventeenth Karmapa, Ogyen Trinley Dorje. The 11th Pawo Rinpoche was enthroned at Nenang Monastery near Lhasa in 1995 and given the name Tsuglag Tenzin Künsang Chökyi Nyima or Tsuglag Mawey Drayang. Following the Seventeenth Karmapa, Ogyen Trinley Dorje's escape to India in 2000, which was aided by a monk from Nenang, reports surfaced that, in reprisal, the child Pawo had been removed for a while from his monastery and that his religious education had been restricted.

== History ==
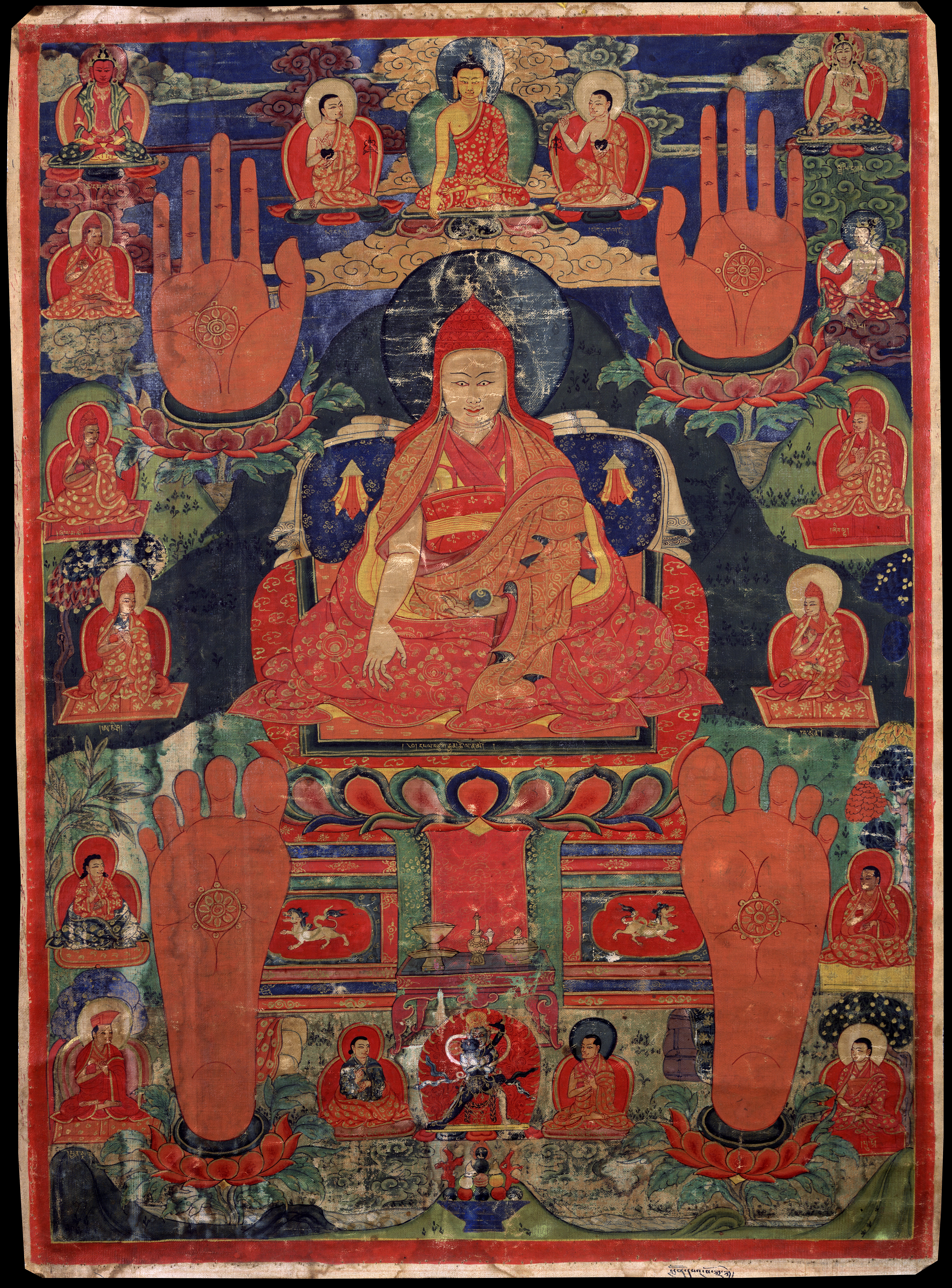
Tsuglag Gyatso, 3rd Pawo Rinpoche (c. 1567-1630), 17th-century painting from the Rubin Museum of Art

The first Pawo, Chöwang Lhundrup, was born in 1440 in the Yarlung Valley of Ü-Tsang. It is said that he was given the title Pawo "hero" as a result of the supernatural powers he displayed at a young age. He became a student of Chödrak Gyatso, 7th Karmapa Lama, whom he encountered in southern Tibet. Being first a Nyingma meditation master, Chöwang Lhundrup became one of the Karmapa's spiritual heirs, the Karmapa establishing him as the head of Sékhar Gutok Monastery (Wylie: sras mkhar dgu thog dgon, the place where Milarepa and Marpa Lotsawa lived.

The second Pawo, Pawo Tsuglag Threngwa, was the "moon-like" disciple of Mikyö Dorje, 8th Karmapa Lama, as well as a famous author of historical, philosophical and astrological texts. In 1673, during the reign of the 5th Dalai Lama, the seat of the lineage was moved from Sekhar Guthog to Nenang Monastery, which is located near Tsurphu Monastery, the main monastery of the Karmapas.

== List of Pawos ==
	name	life span	Tibetan	Wylie
1.	Chöwang Lhündrup	1440–1503	ཆོས་དབང་ལྷུན་གྲུབ་	chos dbang lhun grub
2.	Tsuklak Trengwa	1504–1566	གཙུག་ལག་ཕྲེང་བ་	gtsug lag phreng ba
3.	Tsuklak Gyatso	1567–1633	གཙུག་ལག་རྒྱ་མཚོ་	gtsug lag rgya mtsho
4.	Tsuklak Künzang	1633–1649	གཙུག་ལག་ཀུན་བཟང་	gtsug lag kun bzang
5.	Tsuklak Trinlé Gyatso	1650–1700	གཙུག་ལག་འཕྲིན་ལས་རྒྱ་མཚོ་	gtsug lag 'phrin las rgya mtsho
6.	Tsuklak Chö kyi Döndrup	1701–1718	གཙུག་ལག་ཆོས་ཀྱི་དོན་གྲུབ་	gtsug lag chos kyi don grub
7.	Tsuklak Dakwé Wangpo	1719–1781	གཙུག་ལག་དགའ་བའི་དབང་པོ་	gtsug lag dga' ba'i dbang-po
8.	Tsuklak Chö kyi Gyelpo	1785–1841	གཙུག་ལག་ཆོས་ཀྱི་རྒྱལ་པོ་	gtsug lag chos kyi rgyal po
9.	Tsuklak Nyinjé	?-1910	གཙུག་ལག་ཉིན་བྱེད་	gtsug-lag nyin byed
10.	Tsuklak Mawé Wangchuk	1912–1991	གཙུག་ལག་སྨྲ་བའི་དབང་ཕྱུག་	gtsug lag smra ba'i dbang phyug
11.	Tsuklak Tendzin Künzang Chökyi Nyima	born 1993	གཙུག་ལག་བསྟན་འཛིན་ཀུན་བཟང་ཆོས་ཀྱི་ཉི་མ་	gtsug lag bstan 'dzin kun bzang chos kyi nyi ma
