= A Scholar's Feast =

A Scholar's Feast (Tibetan: མཁས་པའི་དགའ་སྟོན།, Wylie: mkhas pa'i dga' ston), also translated as A Feast for the Wise, is an important religio-historical work written by Pawo Tsuglag Threngwa (1504–1566), the 2nd Nenang Pawo incarnation of the Karma Kagyu tradition of Tibetan Buddhism.
