= Abhisheka =

Ritual milk-bathing in Indian religions

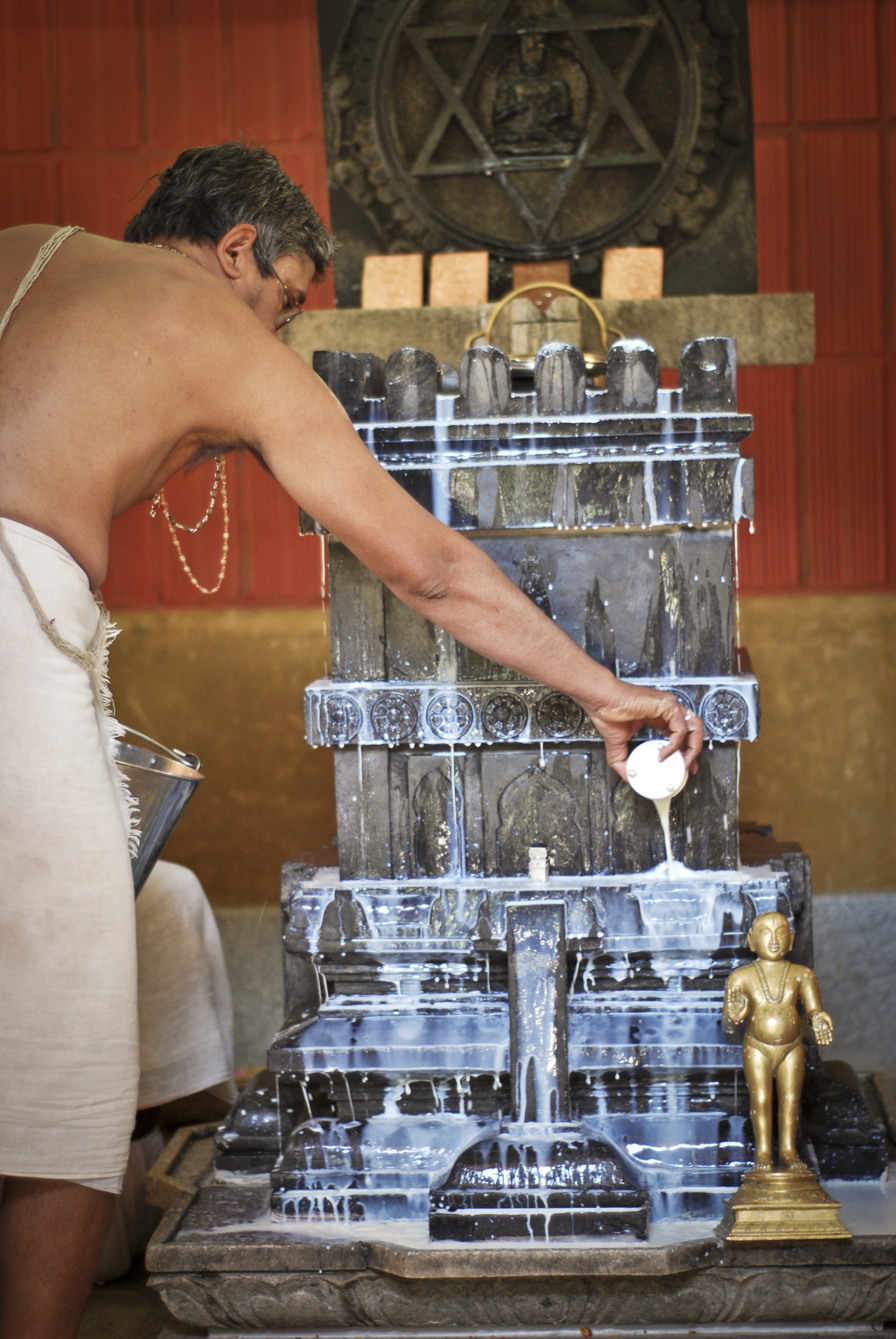
Abhisheka ritual with Panchamrita being conducted over a Hindu shrine

Abhishek (Tamil: அபிஷேகம், Sanskrit: अभिषेक, romanized: Abhiṣeka) is a religious rite or method of prayer in which a devotee pours a liquid offering on an image or murti of a deity. This is common to religions such as Jainism, Hinduism, and Buddhism.

== Hinduism ==
The ritual of abhisheka refers to the bathing of a murti, anointing the deity with a series of auspicious liquids amidst the chanting of mantras. Milk, yogurt, ghee, honey, panchamrita, sesame oil, rose water, or sandalwood paste may be poured, among other offerings, depending on the type of abhishekam being performed. In its most basic form, this bathing ritual is one of the acts that make up nityārādhana, the routine daily worship of a temple deity. The performance of abhisheka symbolically reflects the purification of the devotee's soul. This rite is routinely performed in Hindu temples. A Rudrābhiṣeka or abhiṣeka of Rudra is performed on lingams. A Kumbhabhishekam is a consecration ritual for a Hindu temple.

In Ayurveda, bathing and soothing substances are associated with "coolness," a quality believed to affect both the body and the mind, and most substances used in abhisheka are considered cooling or neutral.

In many Hindu temples, abhisheka is performed many times during the day as part of a fixed ritual schedule, alternating with other rites such as feeding the deity (naivedya), the waving of lamps (arti), and singing bhajans.

== Buddhism ==
=== Tibetan Buddhism ===
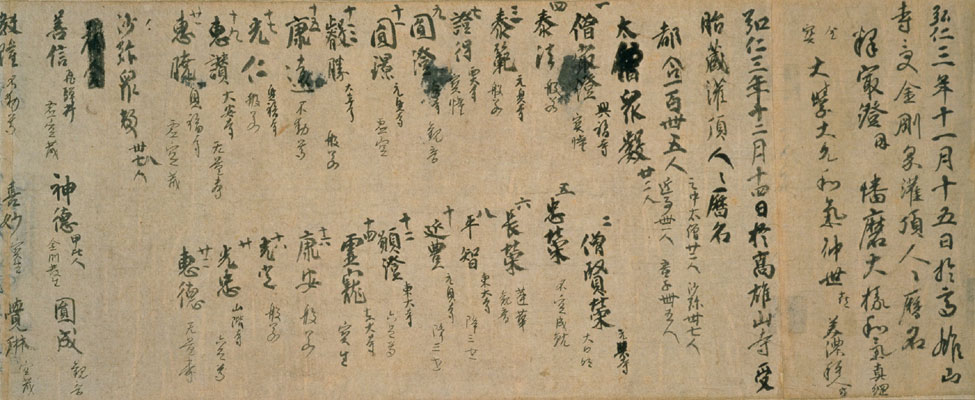
List of Abhiseka initiates in 812 at Takaosan-ji (高雄山寺)

In Vajrayana Buddhism or Mantrayana Buddhism, one enters into the path of Vajrayana Buddhism by receiving the four stages of tantric empowerments, or abhisheka: the vase abhisheka, secret abhisheka, prajnajnana abhisheka, and word abhisheka.

In Vajrayana Buddhism, an abhiṣeka can be a method for performing pointing-out instructions, a way to offer blessings of a lineage to participants, or an empowerment to begin a particular meditation practice.

This empowerment ritual is present in Tibetan Buddhism as well as in Chinese Esoteric Buddhism and in Shingon Buddhism.

The abhiṣeka was originally used as a consecration rite. Water from the four oceans was poured out of golden jars onto the head of royalty. It was used during a monarch's accession and investiture ceremonies.

The abhiseka rite (wangkur) is a prelude for initiation into mystical teaching. There are four classes of abhiseka, each being associated with one of the four Tantras. They are master consecration, secret consecration, knowledge of prajna, and the fourth consecration.

=== Shingon Buddhism ===
The abhiṣeka ritual (灌頂, kanjō) in Shingon Buddhism is the initiation rite used to confirm that a student of esoteric Buddhism has now graduated to a higher level of practice. The kanji used literally mean "pouring from the peak", which poetically describes the process of passing on the master's teachings to the student. The rite was popular in China during the Tang dynasty, and Kūkai, founder of Shingon, studied there extensively before introducing this rite to the Japanese Buddhist establishment of the time. A separate initiation rite for the general public, called the kechien kanjō (結縁灌頂), symbolizes their initiation into esoteric Buddhism. For the Kōyasan sect of Kogi Shingon Buddhism, this rite is generally only offered at Mount Kōya in Wakayama Prefecture in Japan, but it can be offered under qualified masters and under proper auspices outside Japan, albeit very rarely. Non-Kōyasan Shingon sects perform their own rituals, especially if they're of the Shingi school, rather than Kogi.

The Shingon rite utilizes one of the two Mandala of the Two Realms, depending on the occasion. In esoteric ritual, after the student receives the samaya precepts, the teacher of the esoteric Buddhism assumes the role of the teacher, usually Mahavairocana Buddha, while the master and student repeat specific mantras in a form of dialogue taken from esoteric Buddhist sutras. The student, who is blindfolded, then throws a flower upon the Mandala that is constructed, and where it lands (i.e., which deity) helps dictate where the student should focus his devotion on the esoteric path. From there, the student's blindfold is removed and a vajra is placed in hand.

== Jainism ==
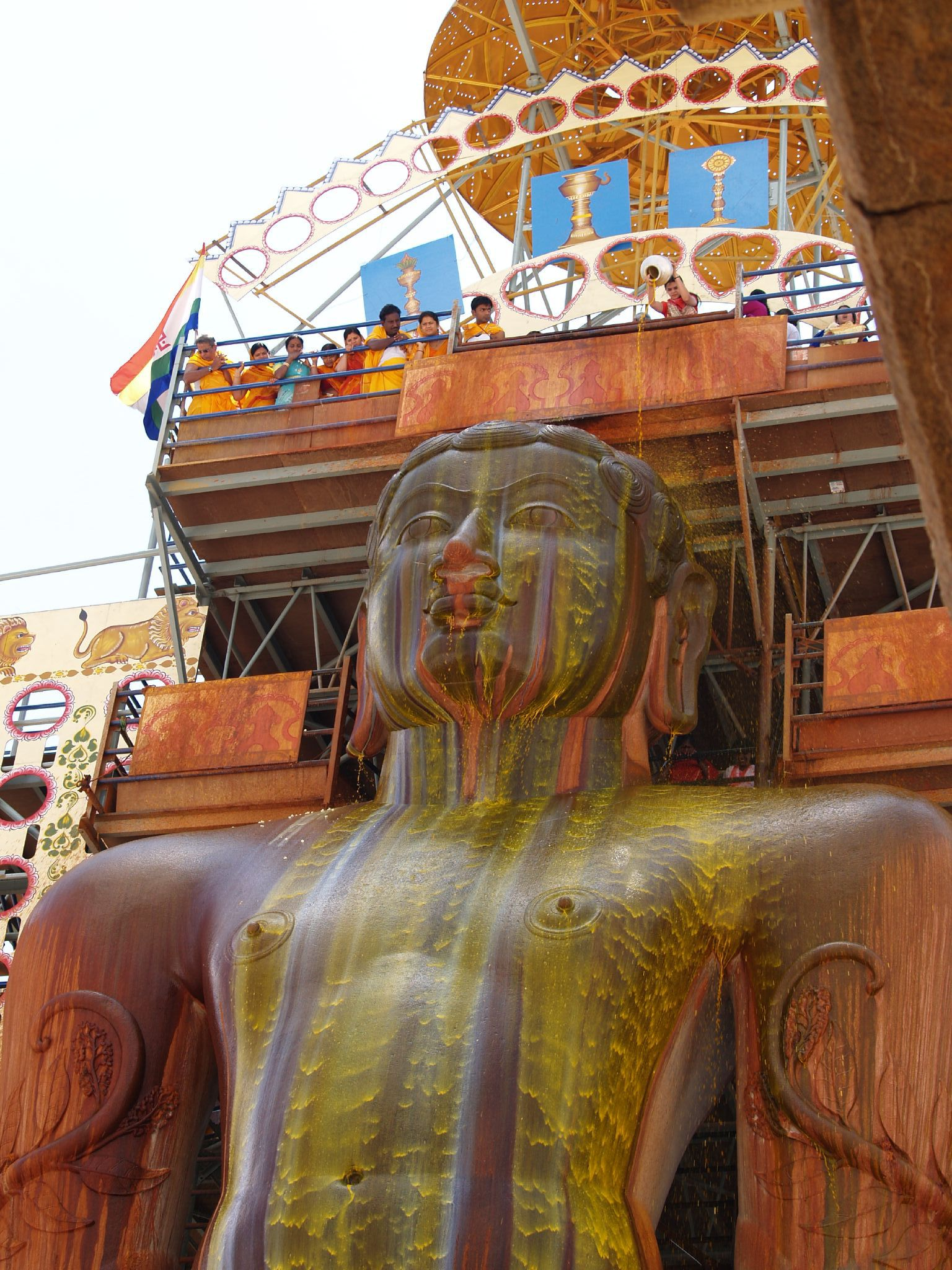
Mahamastakabhisheka of Jain Gommateshwara statue is done every 12 years.

Abhisheka in Jainism means the ritual of consecration of the image of Jina.

== Cultural examples ==
- In the Mahavairocana Sutra, Mahavairocana Buddha reveals the Mandala of the Womb Realm to Vajrasattva and teaches the rites that relate to the Womb Mandala, which are known as, and an example of, abhiṣeka.
- In Hinduism, the god Rama performed abhiṣheka after installing a jyotirlinga in Rameswaram which is now the Ramanathaswamy Temple.

== See also ==
- Awgatha
- Buddhābhiṣeka
- Diksha
- Prana Pratishtha
- Puja (Buddhism)
- Puja (Hinduism)
- Puja (Jainism)
- Rājyābhiṣeka
- Shaktipata
