= Nenang Monastery =

Tibetan Buddhist gompa near Lhasa, Tibet, China

Nenang Nunnery
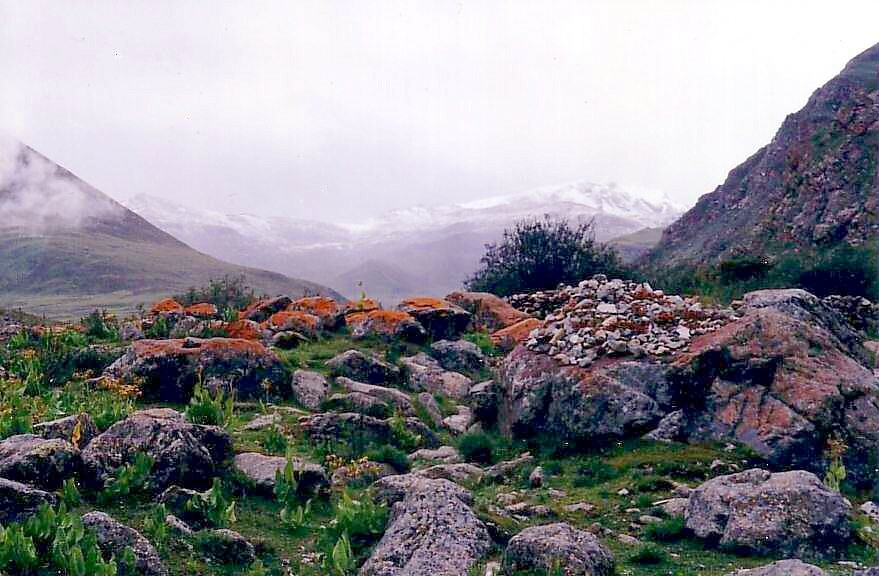
- Nenang is located in the valley below Tsurphu Monastery

- Location within Tibet

Religion
- Affiliation: Tibetan Buddhism
- Sect: Karma Kagyu
- Leadership: Nenang Pawo

Location
- Location: Doilungdêqên County, Lhasa, Tibet Autonomous Region, China
- Country: China
- Interactive map of Nenang Nunnery
- Coordinates: 29°44′45″N 90°41′36″E

Architecture
- Established: 1333

Nénang Monastery (Tibetan: གནས་ནང་དགོན་པ, Wylie: gnas nang dgon pa) is a historical gompa for Buddhist monks and nuns belonging to Sera Monastery. It is located west of Lhasa in Doilungdêqên County (Tibetan Tölung) in Tibet Autonomous Region.

Nenang Monastery is the seat of the Nenang Pawo, an important tulku of the Karma Kagyu school of Tibetan Buddhism.

== Geography ==
The nunnery is located at the end of a valley, approximately 40 kilometres (25 mi) west of Lhasa. Above Nenang, is the Tsurphu Monastery, a monastery which served as the traditional seat of the Karmapa. A river runs through the valley. It is the location of a quarry from where aggregates are carried to Lhasa for building construction, which is raising environmental concerns. As in the case of hermitages and nunneries located in the mountainous terrain immense religiosity is associated with it. Thus, the peak surrounding this nunnery is called the Glorious Copper-Coloured Mountain (Zangs mdog dpal ri), which is the name of Padmasambhava’s celestial palace, as the location was associated with Padmasambhava (Padma’byung gnas). Two large caves here were Padmasambhava’s meditation caves (sgrub phug). Another set of caves, on the hills opposite to the hermitage (ri khrod) were caves of the Sixteen Arhats (gnas brtan bcu drug). These sites are all now in total ruins. It is therefore hard to even accept that a live and active hermitage existed here in the past.

== History ==
In the ninth century Padmasambhava, the Indian Buddhist guru credited with the founding of Buddhism in Tibet, lived and did penance in the caves in the precincts of the monastery. According to oral tradition, Padmasmabhava lived in this cave for three years and three months in retreat. However, establishing the nunnery here is credited to a nun named Jetsün (or Khachö) Dröldor Wangmo (Rje btsureen nam mkha’ spyod sgrol rdor dbang mo), inferred to be a Dakini. Some also say it was founded in 1333 by Tokden Drakpa Senge (1283–1349), the first Shamarpa.

The nunnery flourished briefly for one more generation under an incarnate of the first nun and went into decline thereafter due to lack of further incarnated nuns. It was then brought under the jurisdiction of Khardo Hermitage. The third incarnation of Khardo Rikdzin Chökyi Dorjé (Mkhar rdo sku phreng gsum pa rigs ’dzin chos kyi rdo rje) made it his retreat and also established the nunnery. However, the nuns who felt insecure at this remote location wished to stay closer to Mkhar rdo. Consequently, as directed by the Thirteenth Dalai Lama, in 1930 they exchanged places with the Gnas sgo gdong monastery where monks were residing; the male monks then shifted to Gnas nang.

Post 1959

Following the Cultural Revolution in 1959, the nunnery was locked up and deteriorated into ruins. It was only about a decade ago that some nuns of this nunnery along with an elderly person (the father of one of the nuns) started building temporary huts from the ruins of the former nunnery.
