= Pointing-out instruction =

Introduction to the nature of mind in Tibetan Buddhism

The pointing-out instruction (Tibetan: ངོ་སྤྲོད་, Wylie: ngo sprod, THL: ngo trö) is an introduction to the nature of mind in the Tibetan Buddhist lineages of Mahāmudrā and Dzogchen. In these traditions, a lama gives the pointing-out instruction in such a way that the disciple successfully recognizes the nature of mind.

== Terminology ==
In the Mahāmudrā tradition, pointing-out instruction (Tibetan: ངོ་སྤྲོད་ཀྱི་གདམས་པ་, Wylie: ngo sprod kyi gdams pa, THL: ngo-trö kyi dam-pa) is also referred to as "pointing out the nature of mind" (Tibetan: སེམས་ཀྱི་ངོ་སྤྲོད་, Wylie: sems kyi ngo sprod, THL: sem kyi ngo-trö), "pointing out transmission", or "introduction to the nature of mind". In the Dzogchen tradition, the pointing out instructions are often called the “introduction to awareness” (Tibetan: རིག་པའི་ངོ་སྤྲོད་, Wylie: rig pa'i ngo sprod, THL: rik-pé ngo-trö) or "sems khrid," pronounced "sem tri". Senior Shambhala Buddhist teacher Jeremy Hayward describes this as

[A] direct pointing out of the nature of mind, that is mind's simplicity and universality—all appearances arise within the mind and in that sense there is nothing other than mind, yet mind itself is emptiness, openness beyond concept.

In the Mahāmudrā tradition, the mind pointed out is called "ordinary mind" (Wylie: tha mal gyi shes pa tamel gyi shépa, Sanskrit: *prākṛita-jñana). As the Dzogchen Ponlop Rinpoche explains,

From the Mahamudra point of view, the nature of our mind is completely enlightened right from the beginning, and it is known as ordinary mind. In this context, 'ordinary' does not refer to mundane consciousness—a mind that is totally caught up in this world of Samsara. Ordinary mind refers to Mind that is not fabricated in any way. It is the natural or fundamental state of our mind, totally free from all conceptual elaborations. It is the best part of Mind. When we experience this ordinary Mind, we experience buddha Mind. It does not matter how our mind is manifesting. Whether our thoughts and emotions are positive, negative, or neutral—that mind, in its essence, is totally free from all dualistic fixations.

In the Dzogchen tradition, knowledge of the basis pointed out is called rigpa (Wylie: rig pa, Sanskrit: *vidya).

Sometimes the pointing-out instruction is referred to as "the empowerment of vajra wisdom," "vajrayana transmission" or "esoteric transmission," although these terms can also be applied to formal abhiṣeka as well.

== Mahāmudrā ==
As scholar David Jackson describes, the particular Kagyu tradition of pointing-out instruction outside the tantras was popularized, if not originated, by Gampopa.

One of the special Great Seal (phyag rgya chen po: mahāmudrā) teachings for which sGam-po-pa was best known was his so-called "introduction to the [nature of] Mind" (sems kyi ngo sprod), by which the disciple was led to confront and directly recognize the nature of his or her mind. sGam-po-pa is said to have given such Great Seal instructions sometimes not as secret Vajrayana precepts in connection with initiation and special yogic practices, but rather as a Sūtra-based Great Seal instruction, or even as a doctrine going beyond both Sūtra and Tantra. Later critics such as Sa-skya Paṇḍita (or Sa-paṇ, as he was known for short) maintained, however, that all true Great Seal instructions were Mantrayana teachings that necessitated full, formal Tantric initiation into a maṇḍala. These masters denied in general the existence of any Sūtra-based or non-Tantric Great Seal, and in particular they considered the existence of any Mahāyāna doctrine outside the classes of Pāramitāyāna and Mantrayāna to be impossible.

Jackson reports that, according to a number of Kagyu historians, Gampopa put particular emphasis on pointing out the nature of Mind. Jackson writes

rJe sGam-po-pa had discovered within himself the treasure of innate wisdom, and for him it was also essential to try to convey it to others. And convey it he did, on a scale never before attempted within his lineage. To do so, he bent the traditional rules restricting how certain Vajrayana teachings could be transmitted. He did this out of compassion for his students, in order to establish them in what was most important: profound meditative practice and insight."

There is evidence that this practice derived from (unacknowledged) Chan influence, a controversial issue in Tibet. As scholar Matthew Kapstein writes, the

... much contested doctrine sometimes called the 'mahamudra of the sutra tradition' (mdo-lugs phyag-chen) [...] was said to bring about direct insight into the ultimate nature of Mind, owing to the impact of an 'introduction' (ngo-sprod; see chapter 10) conferred by one's teacher, without the disciple's having first traversed the entire sequence of tantric initiation and yogic practice [...] [Gampopa and other Kagyüpa teachers] certainly wished to avoid suggesting that what they were teaching was a rehashing of the Chinese Chan doctrine, which after all had been condemned in the Kadampa tradition of the eleventh-century teacher Potowa (1027 or 1031–1105), a tradition with which Gampopa was himself closely affiliated.
This ploy, however, was not fully successful. Sakya Paṇḍita (1182–1251), for one, recognized very clearly that the Kagyüpa teaching drew some of its inspiration from such sources, and so he castigated its 'sutra tradition of the mahamudra' as what he termed, with apparent derision, 'Chinese Great Perfection' (Rgya-nag rdzogs-chen)."

The mahāmudrā tradition also includes a "fourfold pointing-out instructions" (pointing out the nature of Mind on the basis of appearances) presented by Karmapa Wangchuk Dorje in his three texts on mahāmudrā.

== Dzogchen ==
In Dzogchen tradition, pointing-out instruction (Tibetan: ངོ་སྤྲོད་ཀྱི་གདམས་པ་, Wylie: ngo sprod kyi gdams pa, THL: ngo-trö kyi dam-pa) is also referred to as "pointing out the nature of mind" (Tibetan: སེམས་ཀྱི་ངོ་སྤྲོད་, Wylie: sems kyi ngo sprod, THL: sem kyi ngo-trö), "pointing out transmission", or "introduction to the nature of mind". The pointing-out instruction (ngo sprod) is an introduction to the nature of mind. A lama gives the pointing-out instruction in such a way that the disciple successfully recognizes the nature of mind.

== Efficacy ==
According to Dzogchen master Tulku Urgyen Rinpoche, "Once one has received the pointing-out instruction there is the chance of either recognizing it or not."

Bruce Newman, a long-time student of Tulku Urgyen's son, Chökyi Nyima Rinpoche, describes the possible responses of the student to the pointing out instruction:

So at this point one of two things may have happened: You've had some experience that you think or hope is the experience, or you haven't. If you haven't, you can report, "Rinpoche, I've been trying to meditate on what you said when you said, 'Mind is empty.' But nothing has happened. I don't understand—I have no idea what you're talking about! Can you give me one word of advice on how to proceed?" Then you take that advice and start all over. A word of caution: he may not answer you straight away. He might say that you have to do some other practice, such as the preliminary practices, to clear away obstacles to your understanding. Complete these practices to his satisfaction then report back for further clarification and instruction, for however long it takes. At this point you'll know that your practice is proceeding in the right direction.

If you had some experience, report back for confirmation. Don't assume you've understood. There are countless ways to get it wrong, and if you do, it will make the rest of your practice wobbly, since it will based on a wrong view. It would be like building a house on a rotten foundation.

When you report back, you can say, "Rinpoche, in your teaching you said that Mind was empty. Since then I've been trying to meditate on your words and I've had the following experience..." It's very difficult to put these kinds of experiences into words, but please try; it's really worth the effort. Study helps here—it provides you with the vocabulary to explain yourself. So you might ask, "Is this really it?" He might ask you several questions, often to discern whether you're talking about a real experience or mostly mixing it up with what you've read or heard. If he says "no," "not quite," etc., then you go back to the beginning. If it's a definite "yes," then ask for further clarification, some instruction on how to proceed. Even if you have recognized and your teacher has unequivocally confirmed your recognition, there's still much more to learn. First are the techniques for repeating and stabilizing the recognition. (This is, of course, many lifetimes of work!) Second, there will be doubts, and you'll have experiences you're not sure how to categorize. "Was that last experience really rigpa? Perhaps it wasn't empty enough." This can go on for a long time. The doubting and questioning can start to become problematic after a while, but it's very necessary in the beginning to make sure you have it right.

According to Orgyen Tobgyal Rinpoche, few contemporary disciples are capable of recognition, even when receiving pointing out instructions from superior masters:

Once I witnessed Tulku Urgyen Rinpoche give the pointing out instruction to a gathering of more than one thousand people in Taiwan. He still gave the real thing nakedly and directly, leaving nothing out. This must exemplify what they call the 'expression of compassionate capacity,' for he rose to the occasion out of the power of his realization. He said, 'The oral instruction is like a candle: you can see while you hold it, and when you give it away you have no more light. But since all of you have taken the trouble to come here, expecting to hear me speak, I feel that I cannot refuse giving you the pointing-out instruction.' Then he gave the instruction in coming face to face with your own nature. Even if the great Khyentse, Kongtrül or Longchenpa were doing so, it wouldn't surpass his instruction. Yet I later met only a few there who truly recognized their own nature. Even among Rinpoche's Western students there were some very close disciples who definitely should have recognized their buddha nature. They probably had some vague glimpse of recognition; yet they use empty words, and ignore the consequences of their actions. I have yet to meet one who has fully realized his teachings.

The Dzogchen Ponlop Rinpoche characterizes recognition as follows:

Receiving pointing-out instructions is similar to watching a movie preview. Unless we see the preview, we have no idea what the movie will be about. So a preview is an excellent way to be introduced to what a particular movie might be like. We might see the preview and then decide to skip the film—that is up to us. No one is going to force us to sit through the whole movie.

Similarly, we get a preview of the Mahamudra experience when we receive the pointing-out instructions from our guru. They give us a glimpse or flash experience of Mahamudra. They give us a sense of direction and motivate us to go further; however, it is up to us to extend our exploration so that we eventually come to a genuine realization of Mahamudra. Without this flash experience, we would have no way to be exposed to the nature of Mind so directly, so nakedly. That flash is a transmission of the lineage, a wonderful blessing through which we are introduced to the deeper experience and realization of the Mahamudra path. This shows how necessary it is to rely on the lineage transmission and to be connected to a genuine lineage master. Without the pure and genuine lineage, without a qualified lineage master, we would have no way to experience such a preview, such a flash experience.

== Secrecy ==
According to the Dalai Lama in The Gelug/Kagyü Tradition of Mahamudra:

The Kagyu system refers to those who manifest clear light mind by relying on the methods for penetrating vital points of the external and internal body as those who progress through graded stages of methods. Such practitioners manifest clear light mind by progressing through stages. Those with sharp faculties, however, may be practitioners for whom everything happens at once. The Nyingma tradition of dzogchen also distinguishes between these two types of practitioners. Those who manifest rigpa, pure awareness, by training through stages involving various practices with the energy-winds, tummo, and so forth are those who progress through graded stages, while those for whom everything happens at once achieve the same by relying solely on meditation on a nonconceptual state of mental consciousness without the practices of the energy channels and energy-winds.

According to one Kagyu text, the method of practice of those for whom everything happens at once is powerful medicine. But it is deadly poison for those who progress through graded stages. In other words, the method of practice of meditating solely on the nonconceptual state of the mind is suited only for those of sharpest faculties. For those who are not of their level, such practice brings only harm, no benefit. For them the medicine acts like a poison.

Kaydrub Norzang-gyatso, in A Lamp for Clarifying Mahamudra to Establish the Single Intention of the Kagyu and Gelug Traditions, has explained that those for whom everything happens at once are persons who have trained extensively through stages either in previous lives or earlier in this life. As a result, meditation on the nonconceptual state of the mind, without need to rely on any further meditation on penetrating vital points of the vajra-body, alone causes clear light mind to manifest so that everything happens at once. Such meditation does this by acting as a circumstance for triggering the ripening of potentials built up from previous practice with energy-winds and so forth, so that they automatically enter, abide and dissolve in the central energy-channel. If a practitioner has not built up these potentials, then no matter how intensively he or she may focus in a nonconceptual state of mind, this person is unable to manifest clear light mind or pure awareness. They lack sufficient causes.

== See also ==
- Esoteric transmission
- Subitism
