= Adhiṣṭhāna =

Term for Blessings in Buddhism

The Sanskrit term adhiṣṭhāna (Sanskrit: अधिष्ठान; Tibetan: བྱིན་རླབས, THL: jinlap; Japanese: 加持 kaji; Thai: อธิษฐาน àtíttǎan) is the name for blessings or inspiration that a Buddhist may receive from a Buddha, bodhisattva or guru. The Sanskrit term has various meanings in Mahayana and Vajrayana Buddhism, and can also mean the raised base on which a temple stands. In East Asian Buddhism, adhiṣṭhāna is one of the sources for the concept of a Buddha's "other-power", an idea which is central to Pure Land Buddhism.

== Nomenclature, orthography and etymology ==
Adhiṣṭhāna(m) is a term with multiple meanings: seat; basis; substratum; ground; support; and abode. The Monier-Williams Sanskrit-English Dictionary Online holds the following semantic field for adhiṣṭhāna:

1. [noun] standing by, being at hand, approach
2. standing or resting upon
3. a basis, base
4. the standing-place of the warrior upon the car
5. a position, site, residence, abode, seat
6. a settlement, town, standing over
7. government, authority, power
8. a precedent, rule
9. a benediction (Buddhism)

Francesca Fremantle gives an etymology of Sanskrit adhiṣṭhāna and Tibetan jinlap: "The Sanskrit word literally means "standing over" and conveys ideas of taking possession, dwelling within, presence, protection, and sovereignty. The Tibetan literally means "an engulfing wave or flood of splendor and power."

Dan Martin opines that the Chinese term for adhiṣṭhāna influenced the Tibetan:

Byin-rlabs is commonly glossed as 'gift wave', but it more properly goes back to a literal translation of a Chinese word which was almost certainly made during the earliest introduction of Buddhism into Tibet in the seventh or eighth centuries. It is not a literal translation of the Sanskrit Buddhists term adhisthana. Its actual, or rather its philologically correct, meaning is 'received by (way of) giving'.

== Vajrayana ==
=== Tibetan Buddhism ===
Tsultrim Allione points out that in Tibetan Buddhism adhistana blessings are an important part of the pointing-out instruction received from the guru and lineage. Receiving these blessings is dependent on the student having proper motivation, aspiration and intentionality (bodhicitta) and sufficient "devotion" (Sanskrit: bhakti). These blessings may be received from the student's guru during initiation, from the yidam during deity yoga, or simply from being in the presence of holy objects such as a stupa or the śarīra, "relics", kept inside them. These objects are held to emanate or incite adhiṣṭhāna "blessings, grace" within the mindstream and experience of those connected to them.

==== Stream of blessings ====
In the Indo-Himalayan lineages of Vajrayana, where traditions of Tantra were introduced in the first wave of translations of Sanskrit texts into Old Tibetan from the 8th century onwards, the term chosen by the community of lotsawa "translators", which importantly is one of the most concerted translation efforts in documented history, chose to render adhiṣṭhāna as Tibetan: བྱིན་རླབས, THL: jinlap. This metaphorical usage of "stream, wave, thread, continuum" is reinforced in philosophy with the mindstream doctrine and its relationship to tantric sādhanā, where it is used in visualizations and invocations, particularly in relation to the Three Vajras of Padmasambhava and depicted in Indo-Tibetan Buddhist and Bon iconography such as representations of the Adi-Buddha and Tapihritsa. Martin Mills, in a modern political and power-relations dissection of jinlap in relation to hierarchical structures of the Gelug, a Sarma (second-wave) school, holds that:

The acceptance of offerings by worldly deities and spirits was felt very strongly to oblige the recipient to act in favour of the donor, and particularly to act as their protector (strungma), a term widely used by householders to describe the various numina that inhabited their houses. This protection was seen as being a blessing (chinlabs) which descended upon the offerer from above in the manner of a stream. This metaphor of the stream and its pure source is an important one, and is a central idiom by which hierarchical relations, either in hospitality gatherings, offering practices, or religious teachings, were conceived and spoken about, emphasising once again the salience of height as designating relations with social superiors and preceptors.

An example of this sādhanā is described in The Prayer of Inspiration known as "The Falling Rain of Blessings" (gsol 'debs byin rlabs char 'bebs) (from the Yang Zab Nyingpo).

=== Shingon Buddhism ===
In Shingon Buddhism, an extant non-Himalayan school of Vajrayana, practices involving mantras, mudras, and visualisation exercises aim at achieving honzon kaji or union with the deity. According to Shingon priest Eijun Eidson:

Honzon simply refers to the main deity in any given ritual. Kaji refers to the enhancement of a sentient being's power through the Buddha's power (Nyorai-kaji-riki), and it translates the Sanskrit word adhisthana.

Minoru Kiyota identifies three kinds of adhiṣṭhāna in the theory and practice of Shingon Buddhism:

1. mudra, the finger sign
2. dhāraṇī, secret verses
3. yoga, through meditation practices.

The term adhiṣṭhāna is also used to describe the transformative power of the Buddha. According to D. T. Suzuki:

The Buddha is creative life itself, he creates himself in innumerable forms with all the means native to him. This is called his adhisthana, as it were, emanating from his personality. The idea of adhiṣṭhāna is one of the Mahayana landmarks in the history of Indian Buddhism and it is at the same time the beginning of the 'other-power' (tariki in Japanese) school as distinguished from the 'self-power' (jiriki).

==== Cucumber blessing ====
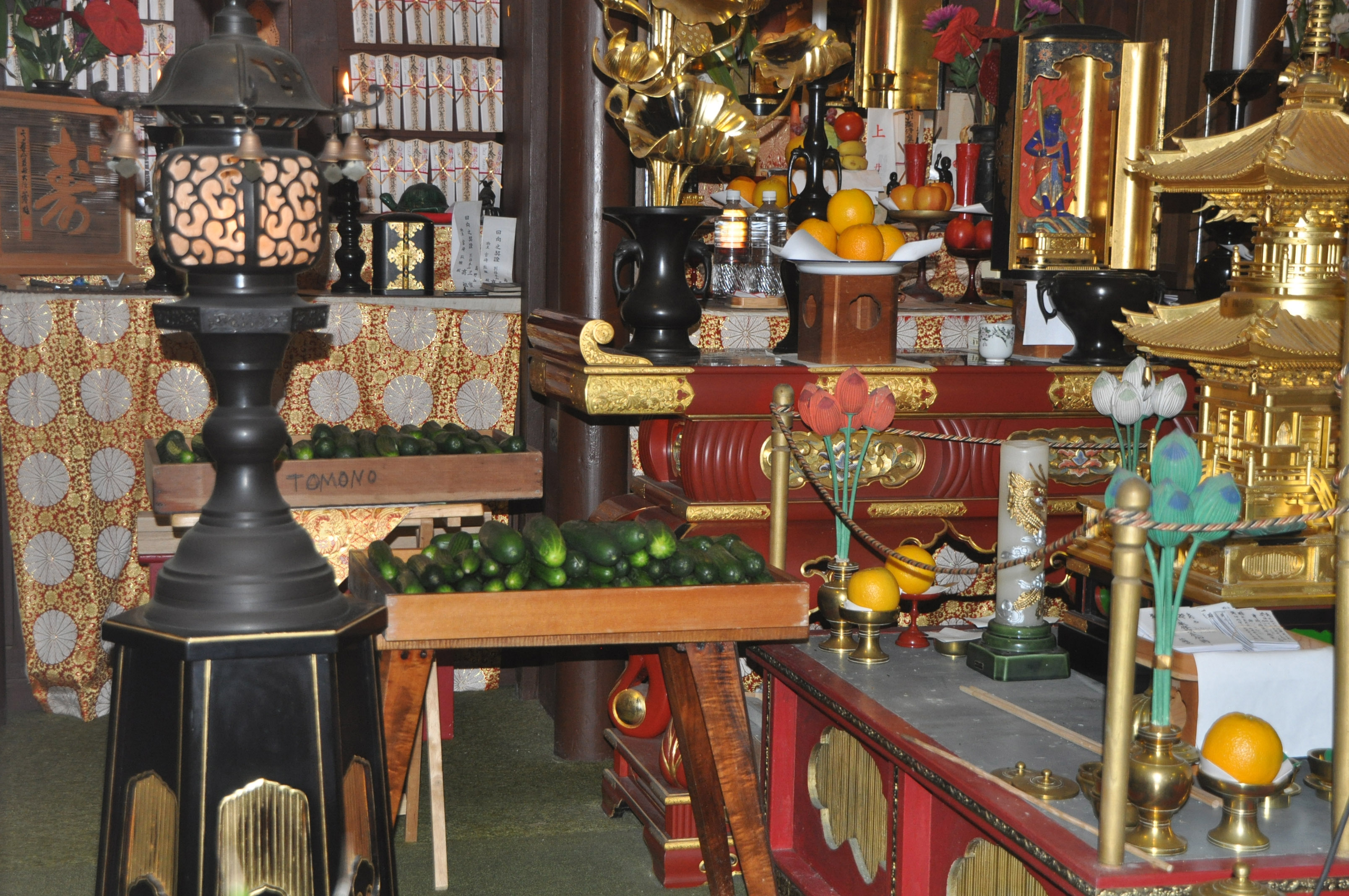
Cucumbers being blessed at a Shingon Buddhist temple in Kailua, Hawaii County, Hawaii.

The cucumber blessing (Japanese: きゅうり加持) is an adhiṣṭhāna practised at Shingon Buddhist temples in summer. In a cucumber blessing meeting, the priest and believers together pray that they can pass the season of hot summer in good health like fresh cucumbers. Kūkai, the founder of Shingon Buddhism, is said to have initiated this practice of blessing.

== See also ==
- Shaktipat
