= 9th Karmapa, Wangchuk Dorje =

Karmapa of Kagyu Tibetan Buddhism (1556–1603)

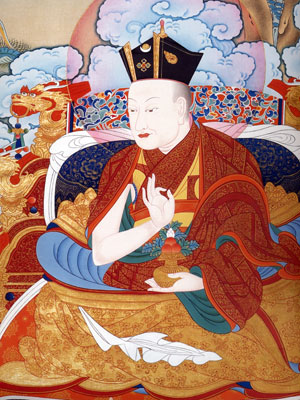
The 9th Karmapa, Wangchuk Dorje (1556–1603)

Wangchuk Dorje (1556–1603) was the ninth Gyalwa Karmapa, head of the Kagyu School of Tibetan Buddhism.

== Life ==
Wangchuk Dorje was born in Treshod, Kham. According to legend, he said after being born: "I am Karmapa." Other sources say that soon after his birth he sat cross-legged for three days and declared he was the Karmapa.

He received his education from Shamar Köncho Yenlak, the fifth Shamarpa, in a nomadic camp which traveled through Tibet but also passed through present day Mongolia and Bhutan. During his travels, many monasteries were founded. Wangchuk Dorje also wrote many classic Buddhist texts, many of which are still being taught today.Biography of the 9th Karmapa

Wangchuk Dorje was not only a spiritual leader, but also a mediator in conflicts. He was invited by the king of Sikkim to settle a dispute while there he founded three monasteries, one of them being in Rumtek, which is currently the most important monastery of the lineage after the Chinese occupation of Tibet. The other two are Phodong and Ralang Monastery

== Mahamudra texts ==
Wangchuk Dorje was not a prolific author, but the texts he did write had an important impact on Mahamudra teaching. Among them:

- The Chariot for Travelling the Path to Freedom ('phags lam bgrod pa'i shing rta, the principal Karma Kagyu ngondro)
- Ocean of Definitive Meaning (nges don rgya mtsho)
- Pointing out the Dharmakaya (chos sku mdzub tshugs)
- Dispelling the Darkness of Ignorance (ma rig mun sel)
- Knowing One Liberates All (gcig shes kun grol, a collection of empowerments)

== See also ==
- Pawo Tsuglag Threngwa

== Footnotes ==
Preceded by Mikyö Dorje	Reincarnation of the Karmapa	Succeeded by Chöying Dorje
