= Marpa Lotsawa =

Tibetan Buddhist teacher (1012–1097)

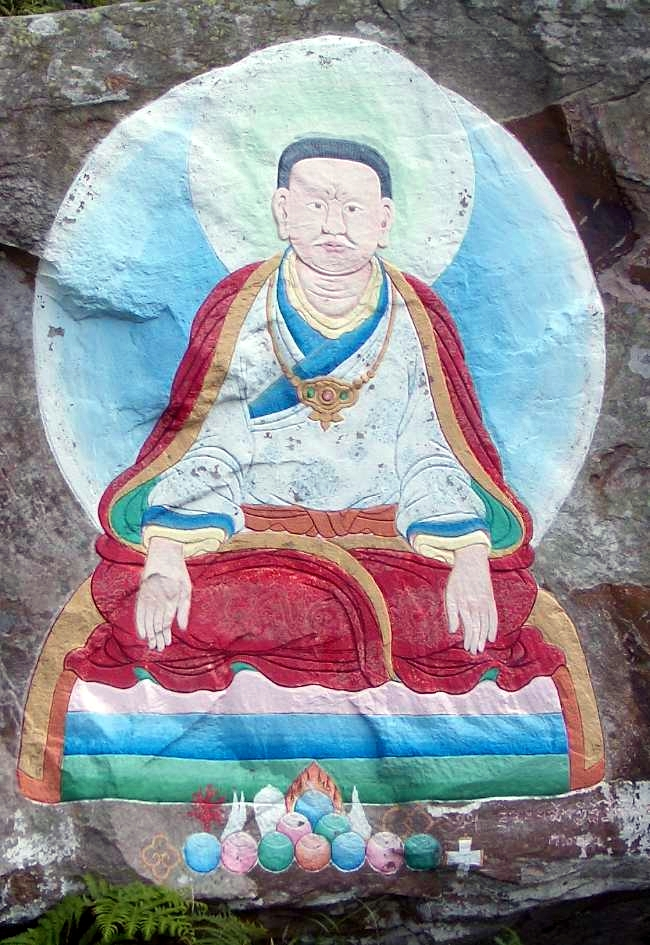
A traditional depiction of Marpa painted on a rock on Holy Isle, Firth of Clyde

Marpa Lotsāwa (མར་པ་ལོ་ཙཱ་བ་ཆོས་ཀྱི་བློ་གྲོས་, 1012–1097), sometimes known fully as Marpa Chökyi Lodrö (Wylie: mar pa chos kyi blo gros) or commonly as Marpa the Translator (Marpa Lotsāwa), was a Tibetan Buddhist teacher credited with the transmission of many Vajrayana teachings from India, including the teachings and lineages of Mahamudra. Due to this, the Kagyu lineage, which he founded, is often called Marpa Kagyu in his honour.

Although some accounts relate that the Mahasiddha Naropa was the personal teacher of Marpa, other accounts suggest that Marpa held Naropa's lineage through intermediary disciples only. Either way, Marpa was a personal student of the Mahasiddha Maitripa and of the dakini Niguma.

== Biography ==
Born as Marpa Chökyi Lodrö, in Lhodrak Chukhyer in the southern part of Tibet, to an affluent family, he began studying at a young age but was wild and untamed compared to other children. Marpa first received instruction for three years at Mangkhar with Drokmi Shakya Yeshe and mastered Sanskrit. He decided to travel to India to study with renowned Indian Buddhist masters. His first trip to Nepal and India was in the company of Nyo Lōtsawa, whom he attended as a servant. Marpa returned home to Lhodrak and converted his entire inheritance into gold to fund his travel expenses and to make offerings to teachers.

Marpa journeyed first to Nepal where he studied with Paindapa and Chitherpa, two famous students of Naropa. Paindapa later accompanied Marpa to Pullahari, near Nalanda University, where Naropa taught. Marpa spent twelve years studying with Naropa and other great Indian gurus, most prominently Maitripada. After twelve years he set forth on his journey back to Tibet to teach and continue his dharma activities.

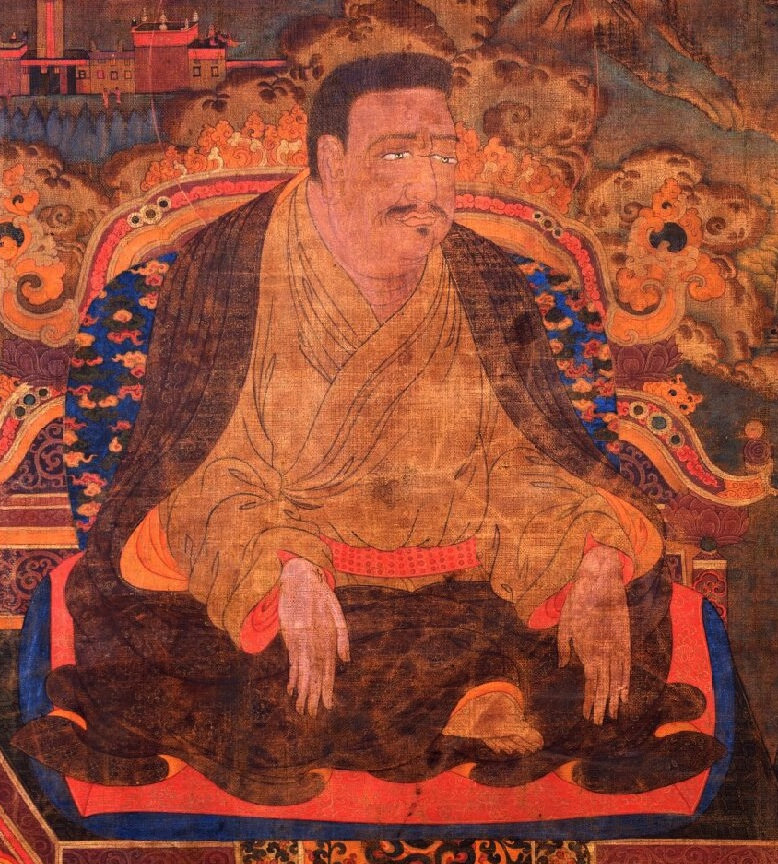
Lotsawa Marpa Chokyi Lodro, (1012-1097)

Marpa was to travel to India twice more and Nepal three more times and studied with Naropa and other great teachers including Maitripa. He is said to have stayed in the cave at Phugtal Monastery. On his third visit to India, Naropa, who was engaged in tantric practices, proved difficult to find. However eventually Marpa found him and received the final teachings and instructions from Naropa. It was then that Naropa prophesied that a family lineage would not continue for Marpa, but that his lineage would be carried on by his disciples. Marpa now had received the full transmission, so Naropa formally declared Marpa to be his successor although he had other major disciples including Paindapa, Chitherpa, Shri Shantibhadra or Kukuripa, and Maitripa.

Upon his return to Tibet, Marpa spent many years translating Buddhist scriptures and made a major contribution to the transmission of the complete buddhadharma to Tibet. Marpa continued to practice and give teachings and transmissions to many students in Tibet. After his second visit to India Milarepa became his disciple. After the death of Marpa's son, Darma Dode, Milarepa inherited his lineage in full. Marpa lived with his wife Dakmema and their sons in Lhodrak in the southern part of Tibet. Marpa is said to have founded Stongdey Monastery in Zanskar in 1052 CE.

Marpa's lineage emphasized the paired systems of the "Six Teachings of Naropa" and the "Great Seal" (Mahamudra). The "Six Teachings of Naropa" included refining techniques of lucid dreaming.

Preceded by Naropa	Kagyu school	Succeeded by Milarepa
