= Abhiṣeka (Buddhism) =

Ritual in Vajrayana Buddhism

In Vajrayāna Buddhism, an empowerment or consecration (Sanskrit: abhiṣeka, lit. ablution; sprinkling) is an esoteric initiation or transmission of secret teachings performed by a tantric guru (vajracharya) to a student in a ritual space containing the mandala of a Buddhist deity. The initiation is traditionally seen as transmitting a certain spiritual power (Sanskrit: adhiṣṭhāna, Tibetan: jinlap, sometimes translated as "blessings") which allows the tantric yogi to reach enlightenment swiftly or to attain other yogic accomplishments.

Many tantric practices are commonly said to be secret, and are only to be revealed after ritual initiation. Other tantric practices may be openly known, but are only considered to be effective after being initiated into the proper mandala which corresponds to a specific practice. The secrecy of teachings was often protected through the use of allusive, indirect, symbolic and metaphorical language (twilight language) which required interpretation and guidance from a teacher. The teachings may also be considered "self-secret", meaning that even if they were to be told directly to a person, that person would not necessarily understand the teachings without proper context or initiation. In this way, the teachings are "secret" to the minds of those who are not following the path with more than a simple sense of curiosity.

Because of their role in giving access to the practices and guiding the student through them, the role of the Vajracharya guru or lama (who himself must have been initiated by a previous guru of a specific lineage) is indispensable in Vajrayāna.

== In Tibetan Buddhism ==
Traditionally, there are three requirements before a student may begin a tantric practice:

1. The ritual empowerment (Tib. wang)
2. A reading of the text by an authorized holder of the practice (Tib. lung)
3. The oral instruction on how to perform the practice (Tib. thri)

=== Empowerment (wang) ===
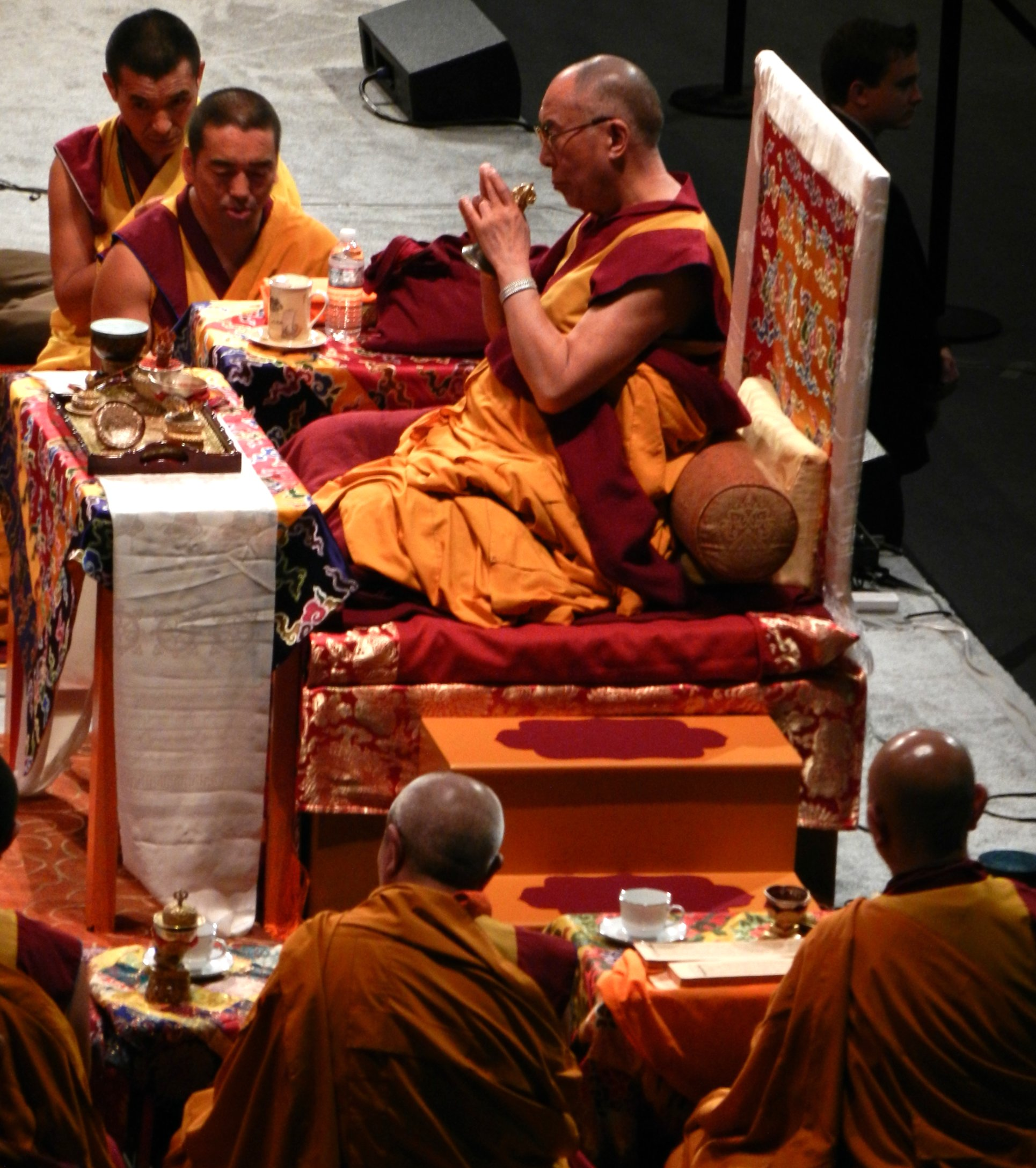
His Holiness the 14th Dalai Lama holds a vajra offering mudra while preparing the Kalachakra mandala during a Kalachakra empowerment ceremony in Washington D.C., USA

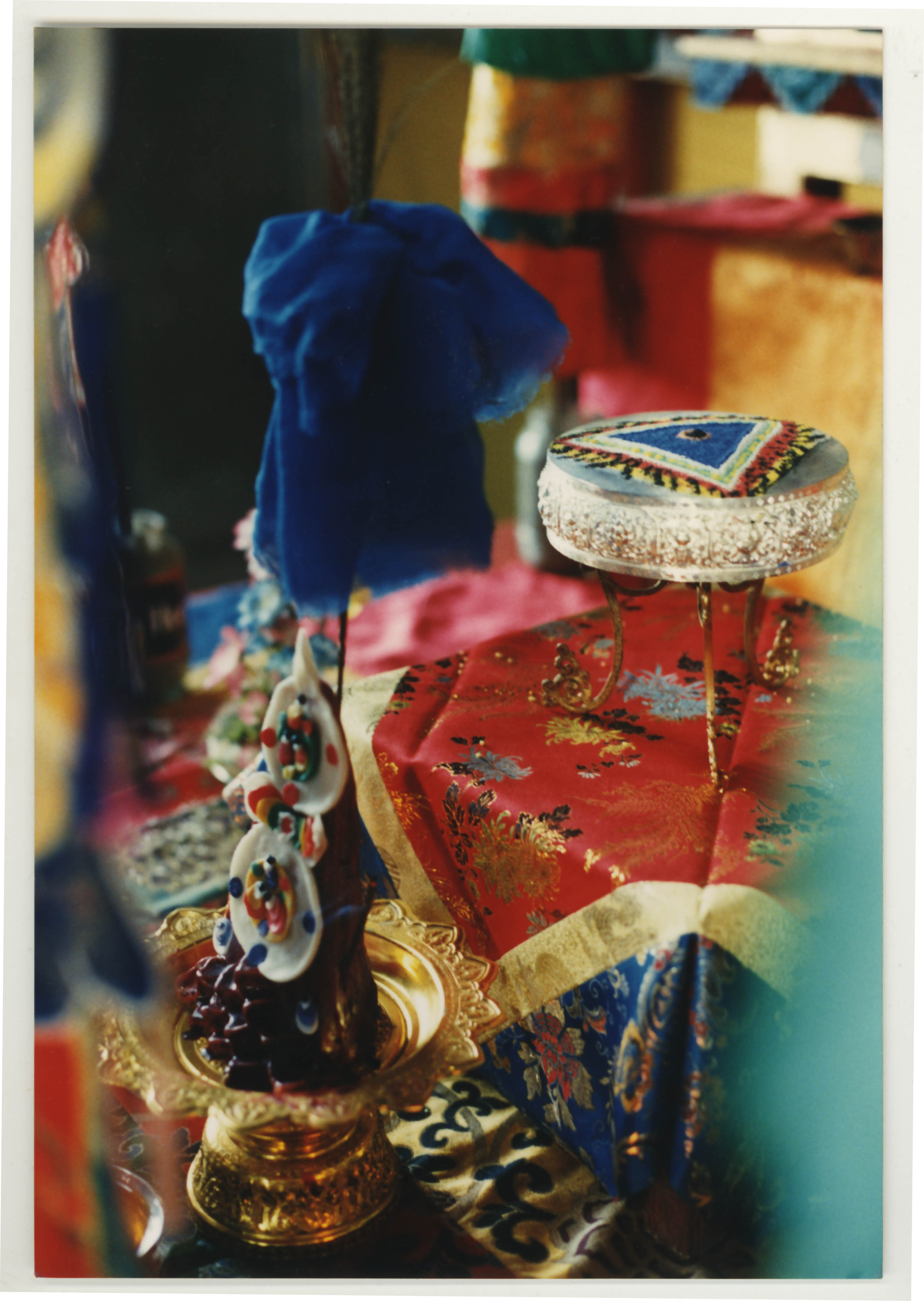
A torma and mandala offering for a Vajrakilaya empowerment ceremony

To practice tantric yoga, it is considered necessary to receive a tantric empowerment (Skt. abhiṣeka; Tib. wang) from a qualified tantric master (Vajracarya, "vajra master"). The Sanskrit term abhiṣeka refers to ritual bathing or anointing. Mipham states that empowerment produces the view of mantra in one's being and that this is the basis for the practice of Vajrayana. According to Mipham,

empowerment is the indispensable initial entry point for the practice of mantra. The reason for this is that the profound empowerment ritual produces a sudden manifestation of the ground maṇḍala that dwells primordially within oneself. This refers to the indivisible truths of purity and equality, which are very difficult to realize.

Kongtrül defines empowerment as "what makes the [student's] mind fully ripened by planting the special seeds of the resultant four dimensions of awakening in the aggregates, elements, and sense fields of the recipient." It is also associated with the conferral of authority, in this case, someone is authorized to cultivate the tantric path.

Empowerment includes introducing the student to a specific mandala (which may be made from flowers, colored powders, grains, paint and a mental mandala). One is not allowed to practice tantra without having received the particular empowerment. Some simpler mantra methods, such as reciting the mani mantra, are open to all however.

In Unsurpassed Yoga Tantra, the ritual procedure generally includes four "wangs" (though it may include more, depending on the system):

1. The Vase (bumpa) empowerment, which is for purification. The vase empowerment symbolizes purification of the body, senses, and world into the emanation body (nirmanakaya) of the deity and may include a vase filled with water.
2. The Secret empowerment, which involves receiving the nectar of the bodhichitta [white and red vital essences] from the union of the vajra master and his consort (either real or imagined) which causes great bliss. According to Mipham, "the secret empowerment purifies the speech and energies into the enjoyment body" (sambhogakaya).
3. The Knowledge wisdom, (prajña-jñana) empowerment. This involves uniting with a real or imaginary consort visualized as deities, giving rise to inner heat (tummo) and experiencing the four blisses and innate pristine awareness. Mipham states that this empowerment "purifies the mind and the essences into the dharma body."
4. The Fourth empowerment (the "word" empowerment) involves the pointing out of ultimate reality, emptiness, or pristine awareness based on the previous experience of the third empowerment. According to Mipham, it purifies the three bodies into the essence body.

=== Oral transmission (lung) ===
- the "reading transmission" of sutrayana texts, in which the entirety of the text is read aloud from teacher to student.
- a similar Vajrayana empowerment that involves the transference of spiritual power from master to augment or refine that of the disciple through the recitation of scripture or song. This oral transmission defines Vajrayana and Ngagpa traditions and provides them with their nomenclature.

=== Explicit instruction (thri) ===
Trhi is the oral instruction and explanations on how to meditate or practice.

== In Dzogchen ==
=== Direct introduction ===
In Dzogchen tradition, direct introduction is called the "Empowerment of Awareness" (Wylie: rig pa'i rtsal dbang, pronounced "rigpay sall wahng"), a technical term employed within the Dzogchen lineages for a particular lineage of empowerment propagated by Jigme Lingpa. This empowerment consists of the direct introduction of the student to the intrinsic nature of their own mind-essence, rigpa, by their empowering master.

=== Pointing-out instruction ===
In Dzogchen tradition, pointing-out instruction (Tibetan: ངོ་སྤྲོད་ཀྱི་གདམས་པ་, Wylie: ngo sprod kyi gdams pa, THL: ngo-trö kyi dam-pa) refers to the teaching called "pointing out nature of mind" (Tibetan: སེམས་ཀྱི་ངོ་སྤྲོད་, Wylie: sems kyi ngo sprod, THL: sem kyi ngo-trö). The lama points out (ngo sprod) nature of mind (rig pa) to the student in a way that facilitates the student's own direct perception of that nature. This teaching may be called "pointing out transmission" or "introduction to nature of mind".

== See also ==
- Initiation
- Shaktipat
- Subitism
