= Naropa =

Indian Buddhist Mahasiddha

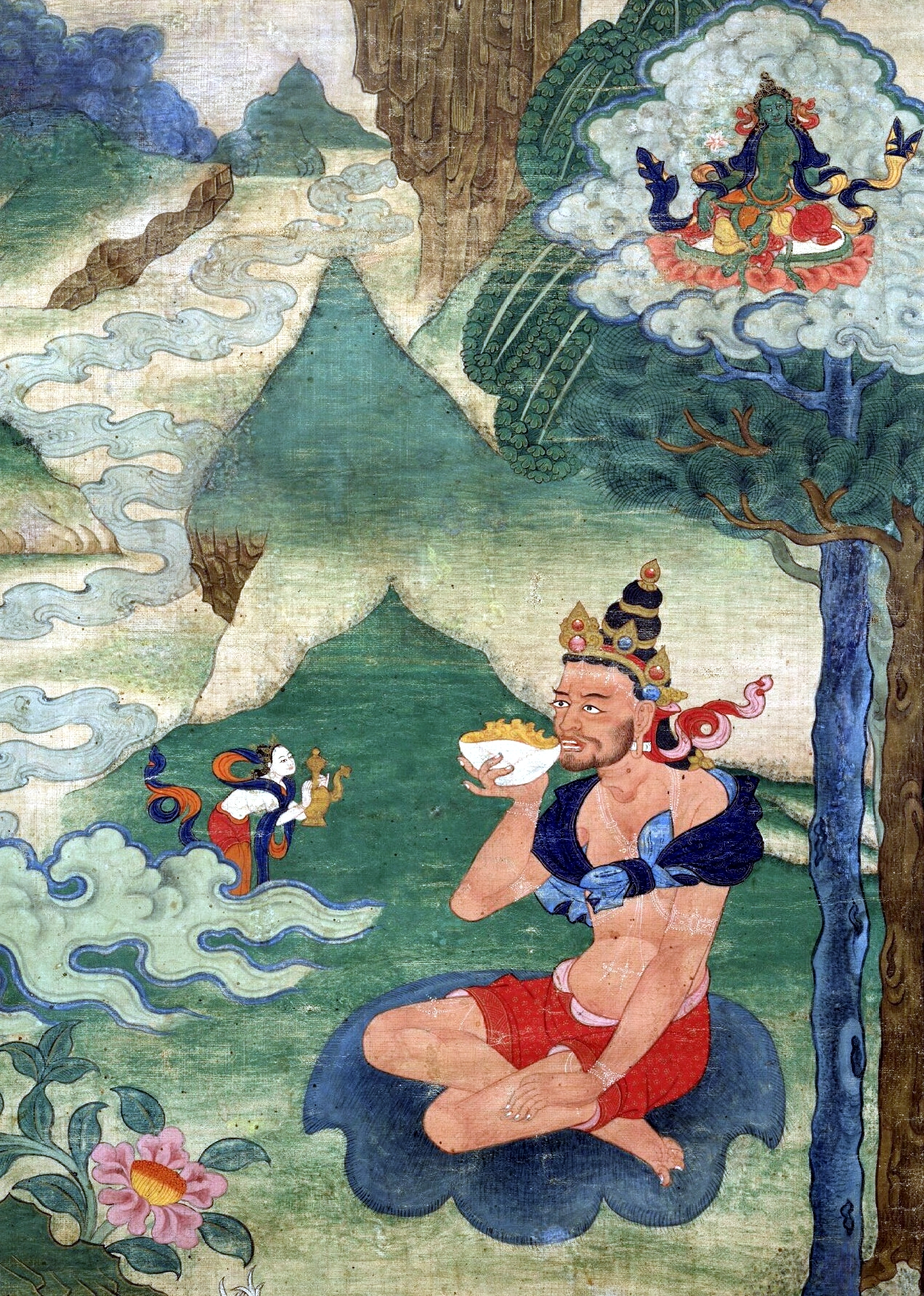

Personal life
- Born: c. 1016 CE
- Died: c. 1100 CE
- Education: Nalanda; Vikramashila

Religious life
- Religion: Buddhism
- School: Mahayana

Senior posting
- Teacher: Tilopa
- Students: Marpa Lotsawa

Nāropā (c. 1016 - 1100 CE) (Prakrit; Sanskrit: Nāropāda, Naḍapāda or Abhayakirti) was an Indian Buddhist Mahasiddha. He was the disciple of Tilopa and brother, or some sources say partner and pupil, of Niguma. As an Indian Mahasiddha, Naropa's instructions inform Vajrayana, particularly his six yogas of Naropa relevant to the completion stage of anuttarayogatantra. He was also one of the "gatekeepers" of Vikramashila monastery and was also associated with Nalanda monastery where he rose to the position of abbot.

Although some accounts relate that Naropa was the personal teacher of Marpa Lotsawa, other accounts suggest that Marpa held Naropa's lineage through intermediary disciples only.

== Names ==
According to scholar John Newman, "the Tibetans give Nāro's name as Nā ro pa, Nā ro paṇ chen, Nā ro ta pa, and so forth. The manuscript of the Paramarthasaṃgraha preserves a Sanskrit form Naḍapāda (Paramarthasaṃgraha 74). A Sanskrit manuscript edited by Tucci preserves an apparent Prakrit form Nāropā, as well as a semi-Sanskritic Nāropāda (Tucci 1930:150 & 152)." The name "Naropa" is derived from the Sanskrit "Nāropāda," which is a combination of two words: Nāro: this is a nickname meaning "man" or "human being" and Pāda: this means "foot" or "step." nāra > vernacular nom. sing. nāro > nāropādāḥ > vernacular nāropā. Tibetan sources also hold that Nāropāda is identical to Yaśobhadra (Tib. sNyan grags bzang po), "the Great Kashmiri" (bṛhatkāśmīra; kha che chen po), the named author of the Vajrapadasārasaṃgraha, which survives in the original Sanskrit.

== Dates ==
Herbert V. Guenther dated Nāropāda to 1016–1100 CE. These dates are based upon Guenther's misunderstanding of dates appearing in the late Tibetan hagiography he translated. These dates are impossible because, e.g., they would make Nāropāda a young man when Atiśa went to Tibet. Turrell V. Wylie argued Nāropā lived 956–1040 CE. John Newman followed Wylie and offered supporting evidence for dating Nāropāda's death to circa 1040 CE, but pointed out that the date for Nāropāda's birth derives from Tibetan sources that calculate dates in the Tibetan element-animal sexagenary cycle chronology, which was never used in India. He concludes that Wylie's date for Nāropāda's birth is uncertain. Newman observes: "As a rule we must be very sceptical of the miraculously precise dates late Tibetan sources provide for events that occurred hundreds of years earlier in India."

== Biography ==
Nāropāda's life story has mainly been represented based upon Tibetan hagiographies (rnam thar), the most detailed of which date to centuries after Nāropāda's lifetime. These hagiographies are filled with miracle stories and they sometimes contradict one another, making the extraction of history from them very difficult. The study of Nāropāda's own writings in their own right – independent of later Tibetan interpretations – remains in its infancy. If we follow the Indian tradition, Nāropāda wrote major works on the Kālacakra tantra, something barely noted in the Tibetan hagiographies.

There are differing accounts about Naropa's birthplace. Ronald Davidson and Fabrizio Toricelli identify Naropa's birthplace with Pataliputra (modern-day Patna, Bihar). The reasoning behind this identification is that some sources mention his birthplace as Nagara which at the time was a territorial division of Pataliputra. Another account states that Naropa was born in Bengal and was a contemporary of Atiśa. Still, other sources identify him as being born into a Kashmiri Brahmin family. His occupation was selling wood. From an early age, Naropa showed an independent streak, hoping to follow a career of study and meditation, but succumbing to his parents' wishes, he agreed to an arranged marriage with a young Brahmin girl. After 8 years they both agreed to dissolve their marriage and become ordained. At the age of 28, Naropa entered the famous Buddhist University at Nalanda where he studied both Sutra and Tantra. He gained the reputation of a great scholar and faultless debater, essential at that time as the tradition of debate was such that the loser automatically became a student of the winner. He eventually gained the title "Guardian of the Northern Gate", engaged in many debates and taught and won many students.

According to his Tibetan namtar, or spiritual biography, one day, while he was studying, a dakini appeared to Naropa and asked if he understood the words of the Dharma, the Buddha's teachings. He replied that he did and when she seemed happy with his response, he added that he also understood their meaning. At this point the dakini burst into tears, stating that he was a great scholar, but also a liar, as the only one who understood the teachings was her brother, Tilopa. On hearing the name "Tilopa", he experienced an intense feeling of devotion, and Naropa realised he needed to find the teacher to achieve full realisation. He abandoned his studies and position at the university and set out to find Tilopa. Naropa then underwent what is known as the twelve minor hardships in his quest to find his teacher, all the hardships being hidden teachings on his path to enlightenment. When he finally met Tilopa, he was given the four complete transmission lineages which he then began to practice. While studying and meditating with Tilopa, Naropa had to undergo a further twelve major hardships, and training to overcome all the obstacles on his path, culminating in his full realisation of mahāmudrā. Naropa spent a total of twelve years with Tilopa. At the bank of the Bagmati river, in the precinct of the Pashupatinath Temple, there is the cave where he was initiated by Tilopa and attained Siddhi.

Later in his life, Naropa stayed in Phullahari, where he died aged 85. Phullahari or Pullahari was located most likely in eastern Bihar or Bengal.

One of the few reliable historical accounts of him comes from a Tibetan translator named Ngatso Lotsawa, who made an effort to visit Naropa at the monastery of Phullahari while waiting to visit with Atiśa at Vikramashila:

Because I went alone as an insignificant monk to see the Lord Atisha —— and because he tarried for a year in Magadha – I thought I would go see the Lord Naropa since his reputation was so great. I went east from Magadha for a month, as I had heard that the Lord was staying in the monastery known as Phullahari. Very great merit arose from being able to go see him. On the day I arrived, they said some feudal prince had come to pay homage. So I went to the spot, and a great throne had been erected. I sat right in front of it. The whole crowd started buzzing, "The Lord is coming!" I looked and the Lord was physically quite corpulent, with his white hair [stained with henna] bright red, and a vermilion turban on. He was being carried [on a palanquin] by four men, and was chewing betel-leaf. I grabbed his feet and thought, "I should listen to his pronouncements!" Stronger and stronger people, though, pushed me further and further from his feet and finally I was tossed out of the crowd. So, there I saw the Lord's face, but did not actually hear his voice.

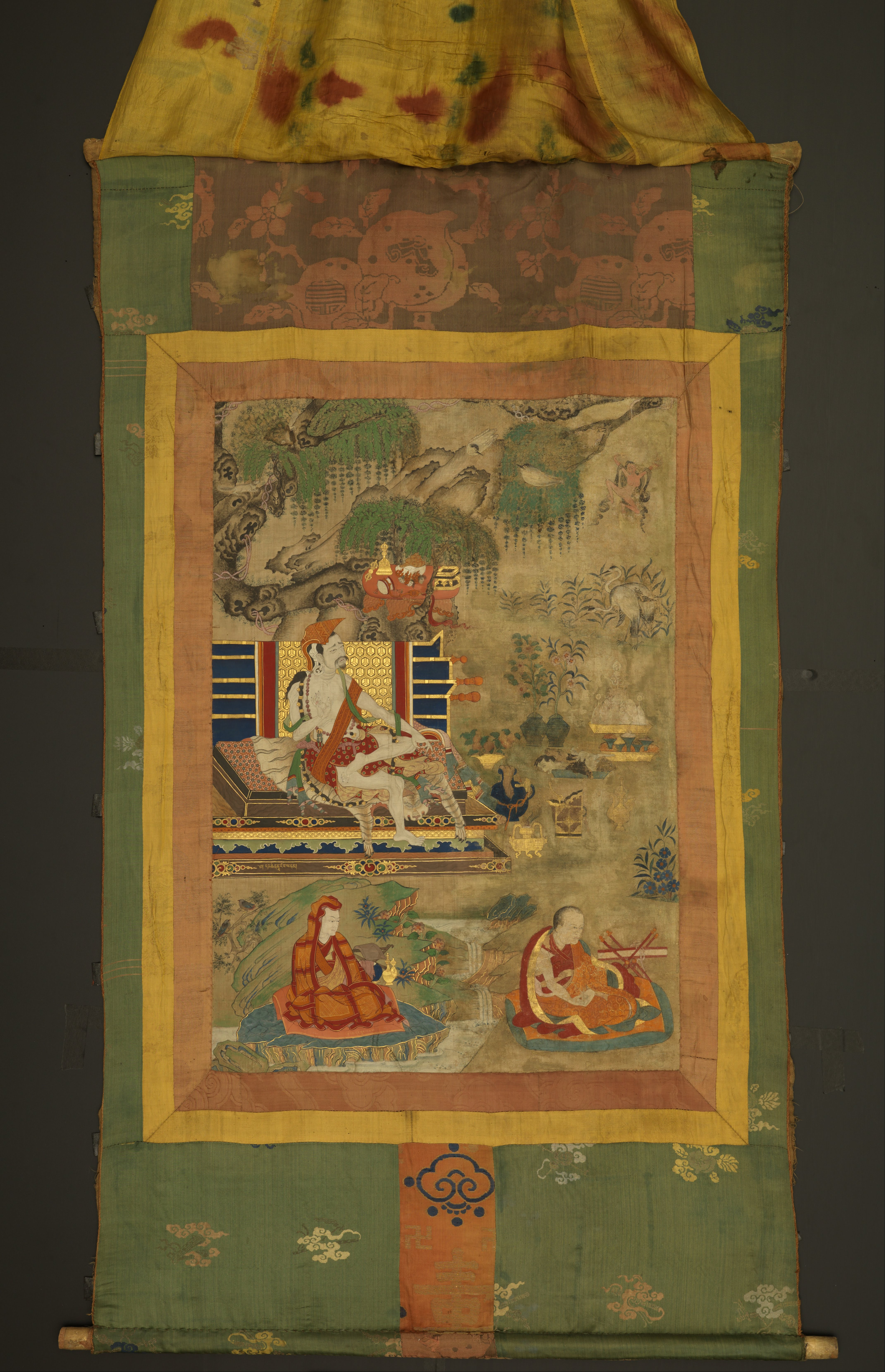
Thangka of Mahasiddha Naropa, 19th century

== Legacy ==
Naropa is remembered for his trust and devotion to his teacher, which, according to his biography, enabled him to attain enlightenment in one lifetime.

He is also remembered as part of the "Golden Garland", meaning he is a lineage holder of the Kagyu school of Tibetan Buddhism and was considered an accomplished scholar. A great practitioner, Naropa is best known for having collated the Six Dharmas. These practices help achieve Buddhahood more rapidly. Many subsequent Karmapas have been particularly adept at one or more of these practices, which in Vajrayana tradition are held to have been given by the Buddha and were passed on through an unbroken lineage via Tilopa to Naropa, Marpa and Milarepa and on to the present day.

Naropa is considered one of the eighty-four mahasiddhas, the 'saints' of Vajrayana. 10th-11th century CE Lamayuru Monastery, in Leh district of Ladakh in India, has the famous "meditation cave of Naropa" named after Naropa preserved within the monastery's central hall. The Naropa University in Colorado, USA is also named in his honour.

== See also ==
- Six yogas of Naropa
- Marpa
- Kagyu

| Preceded by Tilopa | Kagyu school | Succeeded by Marpa |
