= Tsele Natsok Rangdröl =

Buddhist scholar

Tsele Natsok Rangdröl (Tibetan: རྩེ་ལེ་སྣ་ཚོགས་རང་གྲོལ་, Wylie: rtse le sna tshogs rang grol, ZWPY: Zêlê Nacog Rangchoi) (1608-?) was an important master of the Kagyü and Nyingma schools of Tibetan Buddhism. He is also known as Tsele Gotsangpa.
