= 8th Karmapa, Mikyö Dorje =

Karmapa of Kagyu Tibetan Buddhism (1507–1554)

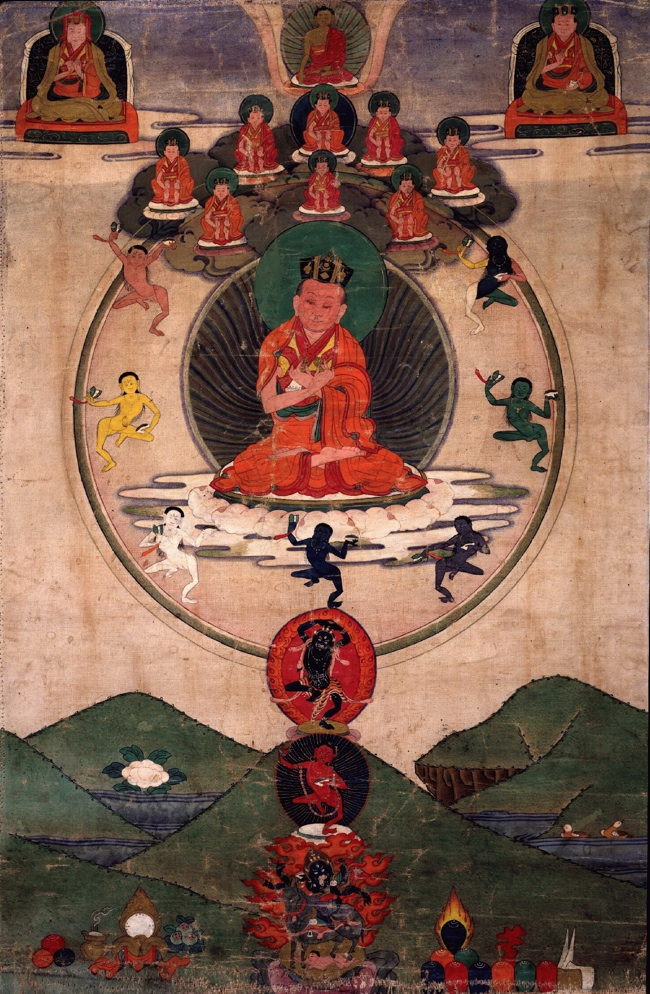
Mikyö Dorje, 8th Karmapa, 19th-century painting, Rubin Museum of Art

Mikyö Dorje (Wylie: mi bskyod rdo rje, 1507–1554) was the eighth Karmapa, head of the Kagyu school of Tibetan Buddhism.

== Biography ==
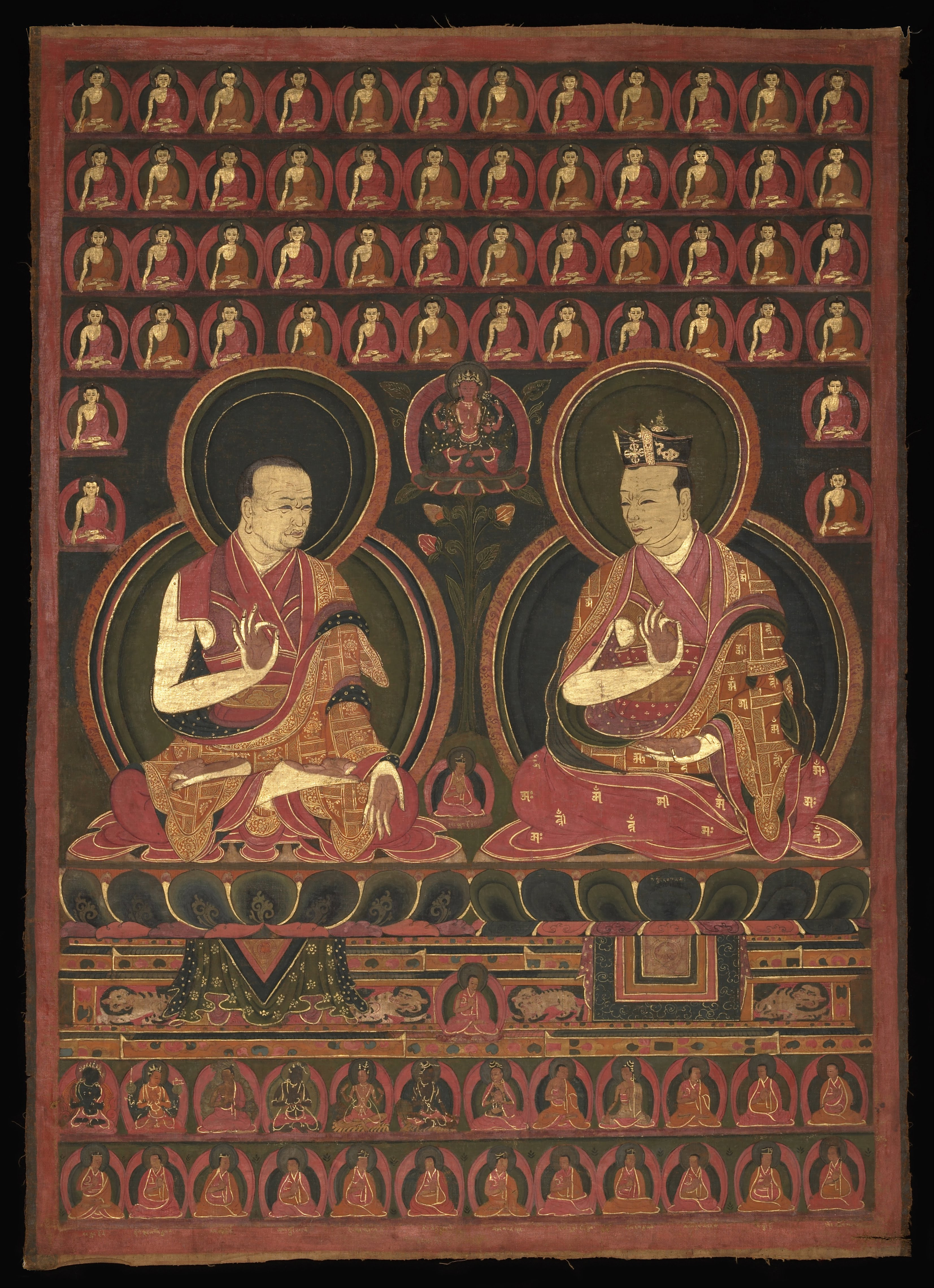
The 8th Karmapa, Mikyö Dorje (1507-1554) and his teacher the First Sangye Nyenpa

Mikyö Dorje was born in Satam, Kham. According to the legend, he said after being born: "I am Karmapa." and was recognized by Tai Situpa. In this case there was another child from Amdo who also claimed to be Karmapa. Gyaltsab Rinpoche, the regent of the region, thought of a test to decide who was the real Karmapa. This was the first time that a test was used to determine a reincarnation. Later this became the standard method for all major lamas.

Mikyö Dorje left numerous Buddhist writings on Gongchik commentary Madhyamaka, Abhidharma, Tantric and Mahamudra texts, poetry (verses of profound wisdom) and even linguistics. He introduced special guru yoga in four sessions, which is the basis for Karma Kagyu teachings. He was also a skillful painter and metal craftsman with many famous thangkas and statues. The eighth Karmapa strongly influenced all arts of his time. He was invited by the emperor of China, however he said that the emperor would die before he could get to him; and according to the legend it happened as well.

He selected as lineage holder the fifth Shamarpa, Konchog Yenlag, whom he had identified, and to whom he had passed on the Kagyu transmission, stating that the Karmapa and Shamarpa incarnations are inseparable, and of the same mindstream.

He compiled a biography of Bodong Chogle Namgyal (1376–1451), one of the main teachers of Dorje Pakmo, entitled Ocean of Miracles (ngo mtshar gyi rgya mtsho).

== Works ==
- The Hundred Pith Instructions of Karmapa Mikyö Dorje
- The Collection of Monastic Activities
- E-Wam Mahamudra, An Introduction to the Three Kayas
- Introduction to the Middle Way

Preceded by Chödrak Gyatso	Reincarnation of the Karmapa	Succeeded by Wangchuk Dorje
