= Changling Rinpoche XV =

Tibetan Buddhist leader (born 1977)

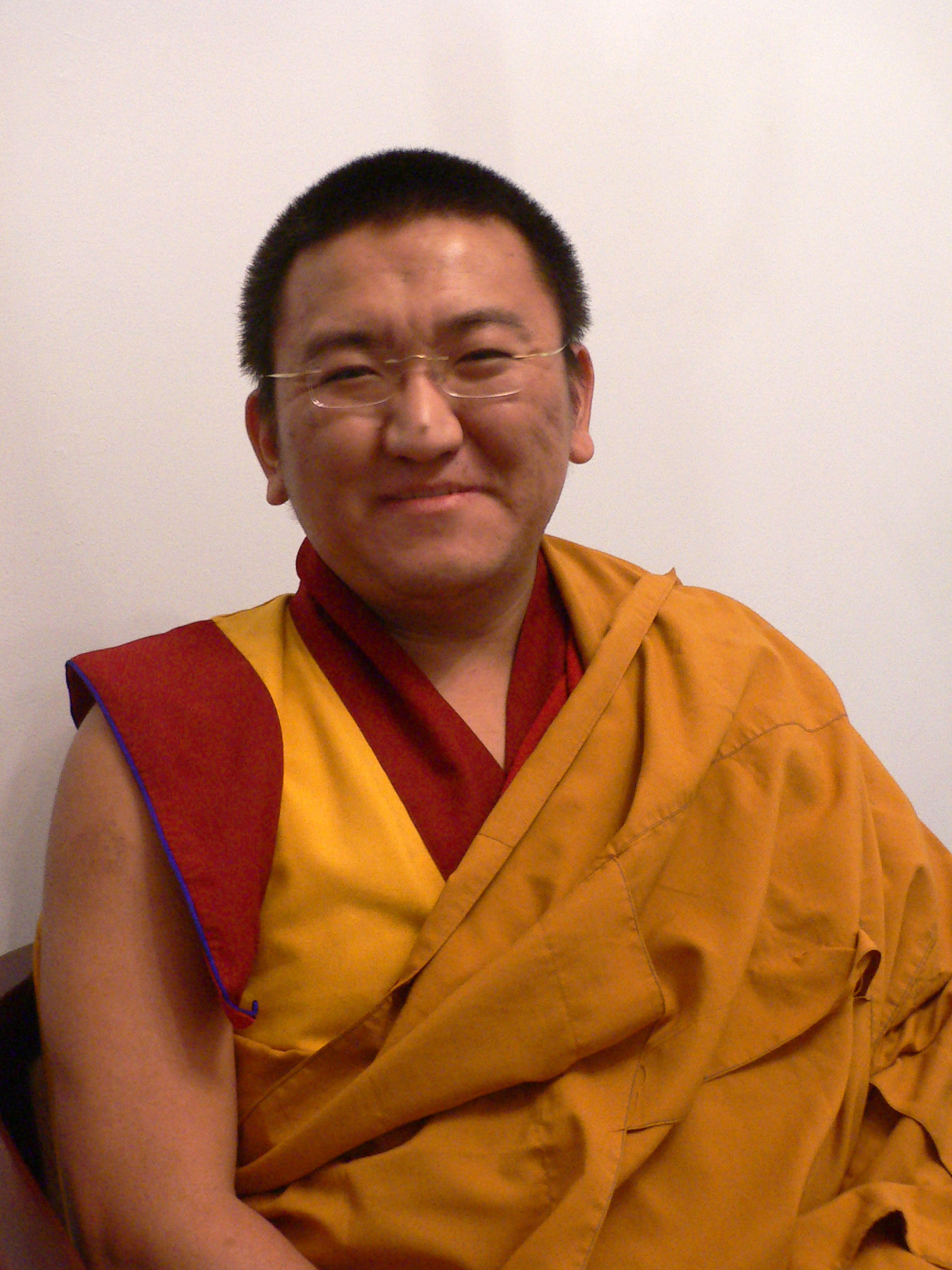
The 15th Changling Rinpoche

Ngawang Lekshey Gyaltso (born 1977 in Kalimpong, India) is the 15th in the lineage of Changling Rinpoches. His lineage was started by Rechung Dorje Drakpa, who lived in eleventh century Tibet.

== Recognition ==
In 1985, Khabje Dilgo Khyentse Rinpoche and Khabje Penor Rinpoche recognized Changling Rinpoche (aka Changling Tulku) as the main tulku of Changchub Ling Monastery in the Ü-Tsang region of Central Tibet. The news came to Rinpoche’s family in Kalimpong via a letter written by the Khabjes.

Changling Rinpoche’s grandmother, surprised by the news, took it upon herself to look into the situation. She traced the source to an old yogi, Lama Trakden, a student of the previous Changling Lingpa. Lama Trakden had gone to see Khyentse Rinpoche who was giving teachings in Mysore at Penor Rinpoche’s monastery and requested him to recognize the tulku of his root teacher. This is how it came about that both Khyentse Rinpoche and Penor Rinpoche made the recognition together.

== Studies ==
As an 11-year-old boy, Changling Rinpoche entered Shechen Monastery and was enthroned by Khyentse Rinpoche and ordained by Trulshik Rinpoche. In the first year Changling Rinpoche learned how to read and write Tibetan. The following year Shechen opened its philosophical college and Dilgo Khyentse Rinpoche put Changling Tulku into the program when he was twelve, an age considerably younger than usual. When Changling Rinpoche was fifteen, his root teacher, Dilgo Khyentse Rinpoche, died. At age sixteen Changling Rinpoche began to give teachings to others students in college. At eighteen Shechen Rabjam Rinpoche, abbot of Shechen Monastery, sent Changling Rinpoche to complete his studies of the Heart Sutra under the tutelage of the great khenpos of Penor Rinpoche’s college in Mysore. Rinpoche took full monk’s ordination at age twenty with Trulshik Rinpoche. Changling Rinpoche graduated with a khenpo degree at the age of twenty-one.

== Career ==
Since the death of Dilgo Khyentse Rinpoche, Rinpoche’s main tutors are Khabjes Trulshik Rinpoche, Dodrupchen Rinpoche, Penor Rinpoche, Taklung Tsetrul Rinpoche and Shechen Rabjam Rinpoche. Changling Rinpoche teaches the senior students at Shechen College, students in traditional three-year retreats, and teaches ritual and Nyingma tantra to senior students.

In previous years Changling Rinpoche was in charge of a section of Shechen Monastery called dratsang, "the collection of monks" and has also been a director of the Shechen Monastery. Changling Rinpoche was also an abbot of Sechen Monastery's shedra (monastic college), a post previously held by historically famous lamas such as Mipham Rinpoche, Shechen Gyaltsap and Khenpo Gangshar. Currently he is devoting his time to writing commentaries on the works of Dilgo Khyentse Rinpoche, developing monastic centres and continued teaching.

== Foreign travel ==
Rinpoche was warmly received when he began to travel and teach outside of Nepal, starting with Australia in 2002. His youthful enthusiasm combined with his knowledge of Buddhist doctrine and command of English language added to his appeal. He began to teach in North America in 2004 and in Europe in 2005. In the United States he has visited both coasts: Santa Cruz, California, and the New York area. In 2008 he also visited Halifax, Berkeley, Boston, and Atlanta. His activities in Canada were originally centered in Vancouver, Victoria, Sechelt and Vancouver Island in British Columbia and later centred upon Halifax. In 2010 the Canadian and United States organizations of the Northern Treasures lineage hosted a visit by the rebirth of his root teacher, Dilgo Khyentse Rinpoche.

== See also ==
- Changling Rinpoche
