= Karuna-Shechen =

International non-profit organization

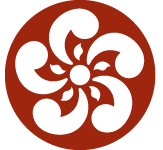
- Founded: 2000
- Founders: Matthieu Ricard and Rabjam Rinpoche
- Type: Humanitarian organisation
- Region served: India, Nepal and Tibet
- Budget: €2.2 million (2017)
- Website: karuna-shechen.org//

Karuna-Shechen is an international non-profit organization which provides health care, education, community development and women empowerment services in India, Nepal and Tibet. It was co-founded in 2000 by Matthieu Ricard, a French Buddhist monk and author, and Shechen Rabjam Rinpoche, a Tibetan Buddhist monk. Karuna-Shechen has branches in France, the United States, Switzerland, Canada and Hong Kong.

== Origin ==
In the early 1970s, Matthieu Ricard had left France to live in the Himalayas. Faced with the difficulties of Tibetans in exile, with Rabjam Rinpoche and a small group of friends, they organized actions in their favour in the 1980s. In 1997, the book Le Moine et le Philosophe (The Monk and the Philosopher), written with his father, the academician Jean-François Revel, was published and became a worldwide success. Thanks to this, Matthieu Ricard founded in 2000, with Rabjam Rinpoche, Karuna-Shechen as a non-profit organization in France. Its name derives from karuṇā, which means "compassion" in Sanskrit, and Shechen Monastery.

== Funding ==
Initially the organization was only supported by the copyrights of Matthieu Ricard's books. It is now also funded by numerous donors, philanthropists and by the proceeds of Ricard's lectures and photography sales. The operational and administrative costs of Karuna-Shechen remain low (less than 8% in 2017) and are typically covered by one generous benefactor, allowing for other collected donations to go directly to program services.

== Activities ==
In 2017, Karuna-Shechen provided healthcare support from clinics in brick-and-mortar facilities and in mobile units that travel to remote villages. 6,725 children in Tibet, Nepal and India received regular education in schools supported by the organization and 2156 women benefited from literacy trainings.

In the same year Swiss newspaper Le Temps described Karuna-Shechen as an organization helping 250,000 people each year in India, Nepal and Tibet. Food, health, education, and prevention of human trafficking are also the organisation's main focus. The diverse array of humanitarian programs benefit marginalized families, mothers and children living in remote villages for a global amount of US$3 million.

Karuna-Shechen also provided women's empowerment programming in Nepal and India: literacy and vocational training programs such as solar technicians, electric rickshaw drivers, small entrepreneurial opportunities and sustainable kitchen gardens.

In 2020, Karuna-Shechen has celebrated its 20th anniversary. A new fixed clinic has been opened in India, in the state of Jharkhand with a capacity of 20,000 people per year. In France, the association helped the charity movement Emmaus and the SAMU social of Paris during the COVID-19 crisis. The organization also offers conferences, videos and other content on the topics of altruism in action and compassion, two states of mind that considered as essential to solving current societal, economic and environmental problems. Thus, according to Matthieu Ricard: "Altruism is not a luxury, but a necessity. It is also the most pragmatic way to meet the challenges of the 21st century".

== 2015 Earthquakes in Nepal ==
The organisation was particularly active following the 2015 earthquakes in Nepal. Karuna-Shechen provided help to over 200,000 people living in 620 remote villages, including 14,445 tarps, more than 850 tons of food, and more than 70,000 hygiene and medical products. The Shechen monastery linked to the organization became a centre for urgent medical care for injured people. More than US$1 million was raised for these operations.
