= Nicolas Revel =

French official

Director of the Assistance Publique–Hôpitaux de Paris
- Incumbent
- Assumed office 5 July 2022
- Preceded by: Martin Hirsch

Chief of Staff of the Prime Minister
- In office 3 July 2020 – 16 May 2022
- Prime Minister: Jean Castex
- Preceded by: Benoît Ribadeau-Dumas
- Succeeded by: Aurelien Rousseau

Director of the National Fund for Health Insurance
- In office 12 November 2014 – 3 July 2020
- Preceded by: Frédéric van Roekeghem
- Succeeded by: Thomas Fatome

Deputy Secretary-General to the President
- In office 15 May 2012 – 12 November 2014 Serving with Emmanuel Macron
- President: François Hollande
- Preceded by: Jean Castex
- Succeeded by: Boris Vallaud

Personal details
- Born: 26 May 1966 (age 60) Paris, France
- Parent(s): Jean-François Revel; Claude Sarraute
- Education: Sciences Po; École nationale d'administration

Nicolas Revel, né Ricard (French pronunciation: [nikɔla ʁəvɛl]; born 26 May 1966) is a French senior civil servant. He was the Prime Minister's Chief of Staff between 3 July 2020 and 16 May 2022. He was Assistant General Secretary of the President alongside Emmanuel Macron from 2012 to 2014, then Director of the National Health Insurance Fund from 2014 to 2020.

== Family ==
Nicolas Revel, born Ricard, is the son of academician Jean-François Revel and journalist Claude Sarraute. His maternal grandmother, Nathalie Sarraute, came to France as a child from what is now Russia.

On his mother's side, he has two half-brothers, Laurent and Martin, and a half-sister, Véronique. On his father's side, he has a half-sister, Ève, and a half-brother, Matthieu Ricard, a Buddhist monk and a writer. His aunts are Anne Sarraute and photographer Dominique Sarraute.

He has three sons named Simon, David, and Benjamin.

== Career ==
A graduate of the Institut d'études politiques de Paris (Public Service section, class of 1988) and former student of the École nationale d'administration (class of Léon-Gambetta, 1991–1993), Nicolas Revel joined the Court of Auditors as legal adviser.

In 2000, he was appointed technical advisor by the Minister of Agriculture Jean Glavany.

After Bertrand Delanoë's victory in the 2001 municipal elections, the new mayor of Paris chose him as deputy chief of staff (in 2003). He appointed him Chief of Staff in 2008.
