= Claude Sarraute =

French writer and journalist (1927–2023)

- Born: Claude Élisabeth Sarraute; 24 July 1927; 16th arrondissement of Paris, France
- Died: 20 June 2023 (aged 95); 4th arrondissement of Paris, France
- Resting place: Montparnasse Cemetery
- Education: École alsacienne
- Alma mater: University of Paris
- Occupations: Journalist; Columnist
- Spouses: Stanley Karnow (m. 1948; div. 1955) Christophe Tzara (m. 1957; div. 1966) Jean-François Revel (m. 1967; died 2009)
- Children: 4, including Nicolas Revel
- Mother: Nathalie Sarraute
- Relatives: Greta Knutson (mother-in-law); Tristan Tzara (father-in-law); Matthieu Ricard (stepson)

Claude Élisabeth Sarraute (24 July 1927 – 20 June 2023) was a French writer and journalist and columnist for Le Monde. She was a recurring panelist on the humoristic radio show Les Grosses Têtes between 1984 and 1995 and from 2014 until her death. She was the daughter of lawyer and novelist Nathalie Sarraute, and lawyer Raymond Sarraute. Her first marriage, with American journalist Stanley Karnow (1925–2013), lasted from 1948 to 1955. She remarried in 1957 to doctor Christophe Tzara (1927–2018), son of Swedish artist Greta Knutson and Romanian Dada poet Tristan Tzara. They had two sons, Laurent and Martin, and divorced in 1966. In 1967, she was married to Jean-François Revel (1924–2006), philosopher, writer and member of the Académie Française from 1998 on. They had two children, a daughter Véronique (born 1968) and a son Nicolas Revel (born 1966), the former Chief of Staff of the Prime Minister Jean Castex.

During the war, her mother and two sisters fled the capital because of the anti-Jewish laws of the Nazi-collaborating Vichy France, but Claude and her father stayed in her native Paris. After the war, she worked for four years as an actress, mainly playing minor roles in avant-garde pieces by contemporaries like Romain Weingarten, until she started working for Le Monde in the early 1950s. She died in the 4th arrondissement of Paris on 20 June 2023, at the age of 95.

== Career and writing style ==
Beyond her long association with Le Monde, Claude Sarraute was especially known for her ironic, conversational, and often self-deprecating style, which set her apart from traditional political or literary columnists. Her columns frequently blended personal anecdotes, cultural commentary, and sharp observations on everyday life, making her one of the most recognizable journalistic voices in France from the 1950s onward.

She also published several collections of essays and memoirs, many of which expanded on themes she explored in her journalism, including family relationships, aging, Parisian life, and the absurdities of modern society. Her writing was often described as humorous yet introspective, reflecting the literary influence of her mother while remaining distinctly her own.

Public persona and media presence:

Sarraute became widely known to the general public through her regular participation on Les Grosses Têtes, where her wit, spontaneity, and dry humor made her a popular figure. Her presence on the program contributed significantly to her reputation beyond the literary world, turning her into a familiar cultural personality for French radio listeners over several decades.

Even after reducing her journalistic output, she remained active in public debates and media appearances, returning to Les Grosses Têtes in 2014, well into her eighties.

== Relationship to literary and intellectual circles ==
As the daughter of Nathalie Sarraute, a central figure of the Nouveau Roman movement, Claude Sarraute grew up surrounded by writers, philosophers, and intellectuals, yet she often emphasized that she consciously avoided becoming a novelist herself. Instead, she chose journalism as a form that allowed her greater freedom and immediacy, distancing herself from strict literary schools.

Her marriage to Jean-François Revel further placed her at the center of French intellectual life during the late 20th century, though she maintained a distinct voice separate from his philosophical and political positions.

== Novels ==
- Dites donc! (1985: a collection of texts from her "Sur le vif" section in Le Monde)
- Allô, Lolotte, c'est Coco (1987)
- Maman coq (1989)
- Mademoiselle, s'il vous plaît! (1991)
- Ah ! l'amour, toujours l'amour (1993)
- Des Hommes en général et des femmes en particulier (1996)
- C'est pas bientôt fini! (1998)
- Dis, est-ce que tu m'aimes? (2000)
- Dis voir, Maminette... (2003)
- Belle belle belle (2005)
- Avant que t'oublies tout! (2009, an autobiography written together with Laurent Ruquier)
- Encore un instant (2017)
