= Yahne Le Toumelin =

French painter (1923–2023)

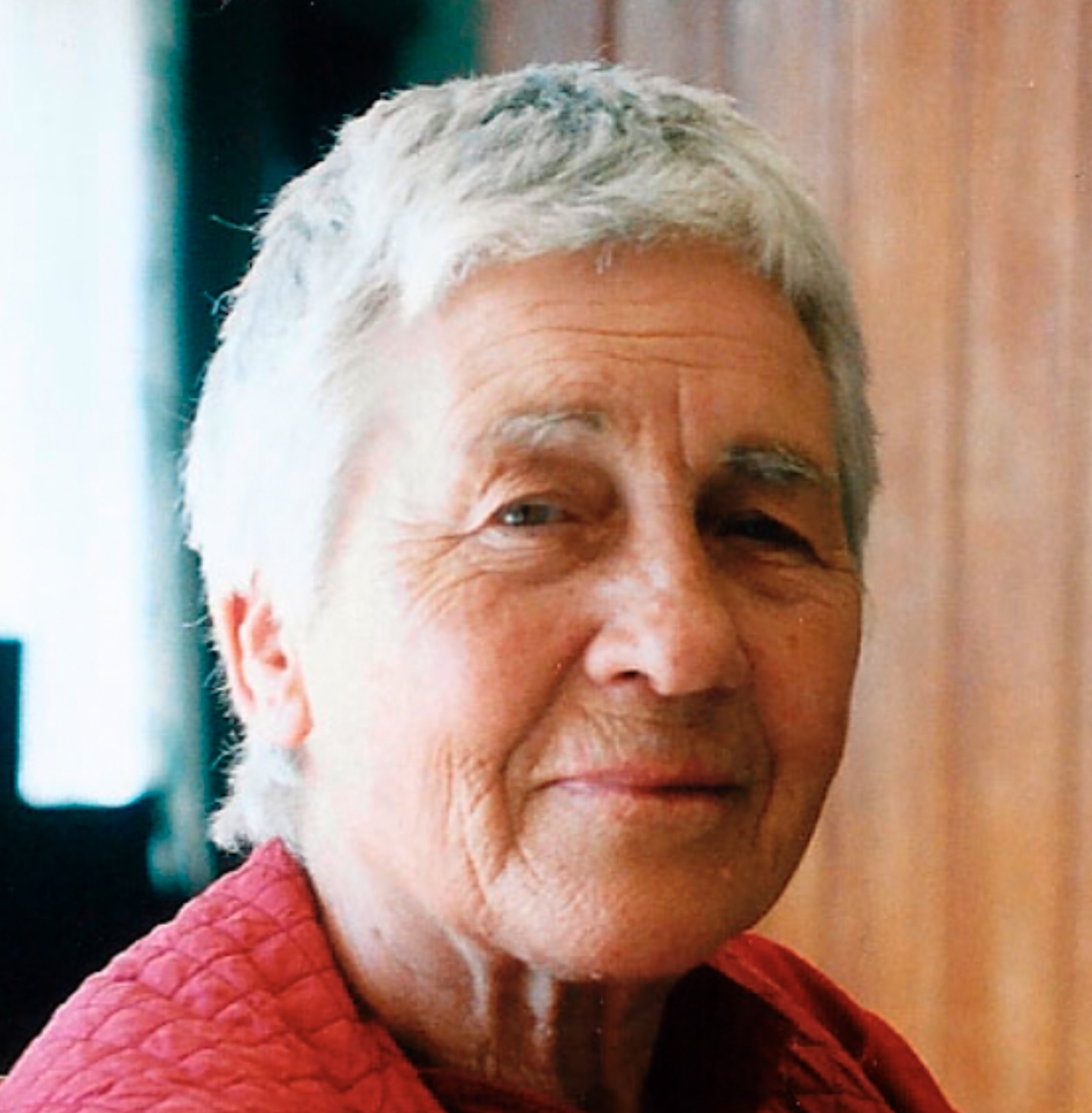
Yahne Le Toumelin in 2020

Yahne Le Toumelin (27 July 1923 Paris - 8 May 2023 Tursac) was a Buddhist nun and French painter. Beginning in the 1950s, she was a surrealist and abstract artist.

== Life ==
Yahne Le Toumelin was born in Paris, and grew up in Le Croisic.

In 1940, she was admitted to the Beaux-Arts de Paris. She studied at the Académie de la Grande Chaumière. She joined André Lhote's workshop where she met Henri Cartier-Bresson.

In 1942, she met Georges Gurdjieff, René Daumal, Lanza del Vasto and Luc Dietrich.

She was commissioned by Pierre Schaeffer and Jacques Copeau to produce radio programs of artistic works at the RTF.

In 1947, she appeared in Le Désordre à Twenty ans, by Jacques Baratier, alongside Jean-Paul Sartre, Simone de Beauvoir, Boris Vian, Orson Welles, Jean Cocteau and Juliette Gréco.

She met Jean-François Revel who proposed to her in the summer of 1945. In 1946 they had a son, Matthieu Ricard. From 1947 to 1948, the couple moved to Tlemcen in Algeria where Jean-François Revel was appointed professor. In 1948, Ève Ricard was born.

From 1950 to 1952, she moved to Mexico where Jean-François Revel was appointed professor at the French Institute of Latin America (IFAL). In Mexico, she became friends with Leonora Carrington.

In 1951, she created a geometric fresco for the French Institute of Latin America and painted film posters for the first film club in Mexico which included Benjamin Péret, Luis Buñuel, Frida Kahlo, Diego Rivera and Mario Vargas Llosa.

In 1952, Yahne Le Toumelin and Jean-François Revel separated.

In 1955, André Breton presented Yahne Le Toumelin in his gallery, À l’Étoile scellée.

In 1956, she returned to Paris; she met the artist Georges Mathieu and became friends with Pierre Soulages and Zao Wou-Ki. In 1957, she exhibited more than 100 paintings at the Orsay gallery and participated in the edition of the catalog prefaced by André Breton. André Breton complemented her work in Surrealism and Painting, which was published by Gallimard in 1965.

In 1959, she joined the René Drouin gallery and, in 1961, exhibited “Essay for the painting of tomorrow” presented by Drouin and Ileana Sonnabend at the Marcelle Dupuis gallery.

In 1967, she opened the Center d'Expression, a gallery located in Paris reviewed by André Fermigier, Trois raisons pour. A few months later, she went to India, converted to Tibetan Buddhism and took vows as a nun at the Rumtek monastery, with Rangjung Rigpe Dorje.

In May 1968, she organized a demonstration entitled The Revolution of the Heart.

In 1969, Maurice Béjart commissioned Yahne Le Toumelin for a fresco and the costumes for Les Vainqueurs.

She stopped painting from 1969 to 1975. In 1985, she settled in Dordogne and completed a traditional Buddhist retreat of three years, three months and three days at the Chanteloube Center in Saint-Léon- sur-Vézère.

In 1989, Yahne Le Toumelin created the Veil of the Raft of the Medusa for the sets of Hommage à la Révolution by Maurice Béjart at the Grand Palais, in Paris.

From 2000, she painted in her studio in the Dordogne.
