= Prakhar =

- Country: Bhutan
- District: Bumthang District

Prakhar is a village in the Bumthang District of Bhutan. Located within the Chhume valley in Central Bhutan, the village is notable for its annual festivals and architecture, including a 16th-century temple and palace known as the Prakhar Ngatsang.

== Description ==
Prakhar is located within the Kingdom of Bhutan. The village falls under the administration of the Bumthang District, one of the 20 Dzongkhags which make up Bhutan. Parkar was at one point part of the Kingdom of Bumthang, which controlled much of the modern-day district of the same name.

The village has existed since at least the 16th century. Due to Prakhar's location near the meeting of two mountain streams, the village became a hub for commerce in the sparsely populated Chhume valley. Several stone homes were built, and over the centuries these became the primary structures used by the town.

=== Notable structures ===
In the 16th century, a man known as Tenpe Nyima reportedly received a vision telling him to build a temple in the Chummei valley. Nyima, who was the grandson of the Buddhist saint Pema Lingpa, noted that his vision had specified that the temple should be built at a place where two streams met by a black road; this description led to Nyima beginning to build a three-story temple in Parkhar, a small village that matched the one he had seen in his dream. According to legend, Nyima worked on his temple during the day, and yet construction mysteriously continued during the night. Local villagers reported that white monkeys were seen building the temple during the night, leading to the temple being named the Prakhar Ngatshang, or "Palace of the White Monkeys".

The modern-day Prakhar Ngatshang is made up of two buildings. The original, 16th century temple built by Nyima is known as the Zha khakhang, and contains art depicting Pema Lingpa. In the 1930s, a second, larger and more extravagant temple was built by one the local rulers of the valley, Dasho Gonpo Dorji. Dorji was himself a descendant of both Nyima and Lingpa. The building he built is known as the ngatshang and contains two temples.

Nyimalung Monastery, which is located near the village, was also built by Dorji in the 1930s.
