= Frédéric van Roekeghem =

French health official

- Born: 2 July 1961 (age 65); Saint-Quentin, France
- Education: École Polytechnique; ENSTA ParisTech
- Occupation: Civil servant

Frédéric Van Roekeghem (born 1961) is a former senior French health official who served as the director of National Insurance Fund for Salaried Workers (CNAMTS) and the National Union of Health Insurance Funds (UNCAM).

== Career ==
In 2004, Van Roekeghem was appointed director of the cabinet of French Minister of Health Philippe Douste-Blazy. In this role, he was instrumental in drafting the Social Security Reform Act of 2004.

On 22 September 2004 he was appointed General Director of the National Workers Health Insurance Fund fr:la Caisse nationale d'assurance-maladie des travailleurs salariés (CNAMTS), replacing Daniel Lenoir. He was then appointed in November 2004 to be director of the overall supervising body of National health insurance funds. fr:Union nationale des caisses d'assurance maladie (UNCAM) which was created in August 2004. He served in this position until 2014, when it was announced he was joining MSH International. He was succeeded by Nicolas Revel.
