= Benoît Ribadeau-Dumas =

French civil servant (born 1972)

Chief of Staff to the Prime Minister
- In office 15 May 2017 – 3 July 2020
- Prime Minister: Édouard Philippe
- Preceded by: Patrick Strzoda
- Succeeded by: Nicolas Revel

Personal details
- Born: 10 June 1972 (age 54) Neuilly-sur-Seine, France
- Education: Lycée Louis-le-Grand
- Alma mater: École polytechnique École nationale d'administration

Benoît Ribadeau-Dumas (born 10 June 1972) is a French civil servant and businessman. From 2017 to 2020, he was chief of staff to prime minister Édouard Philippe. From 2002 to 2004, he w as advisor on reform and decentralization to prime minister Jean-Pierre Raffarin. From 2008 to 2010, he w as CEO of Thales Underwater Systems. From 2015 to 2017, he was CEO of the aerosystems division of Zodiac Aerospace. From January to May 2021, he was deputy CEO of SCOR SE.
