= Danielle Föllmi =

El Salvadorian doctor

Danielle Pons-Föllmi
- Education: Necker-Enfants Malades Hospital
- Occupation: Doctor
- Spouse: Olivier Föllmi (m. 1984)
- Children: 2
- Website: www.atelier-follmi.com/en/

Danielle Pons-Föllmi is a doctor of anesthesiology. Through her publishing company Éditions Föllmi she published the seven volumes of “Wisdoms of Humanity".

== Personal life and education ==
Pons spent her childhood in El Salvador and Central America. She moved to Paris aged 17 where she earned her PhD in medicine at the Necker-Enfants Malades Hospital in 1980. She married the photographer Olivier Föllmi in 1984.

== Career ==
From 1981 to 1984 she undertook missions with Doctors without Borders in Panama, India, Cambodia and Laos. From 1984 to 1991 she practiced medicine, specializing in anesthesiology and resuscitation.

Between 1991 and 1992 she and Olivier lived in northern India with exiled Tibetan community who, in 1992, entrusted them with the adoption of two children. Pons-Föllmi worked on the organization of the basic health requirements of the community and participated in the setting up of a team consisting of Tibetan doctors at the Tibetan children village of Dharamsala in the foothills of the Himalayas. In the same year Pons-Föllmi and Olivier created Himalayan Organization for People and Education (HOPE), an association set up to promote development of the Himalayan world and support Tibetan educational values.

Health problems caused Pons-Föllmi to give up medicine in 1994. She began to study traditional wisdom. In 2002 she created Éditions Föllmi in Annecy and, together with Matthieu Ricard, published of "Himalaya bouddhiste". Between 2003 and 2009 they published seven volumes of the “Wisdoms of Humanity”.

Pons-Föllmi and Olivier were awarded the Vermeille medal by the Société d'Encouragement au Progrès (Society for the Encouragement of Progress) who singles out "those people who, continuously and by dint of personal effort, through their actions and creative spirit, have achieved extraordinary things, with the desire to place them at the service of humanity in any way whatsoever".

== Bibliography ==
Danielle and Olivier Föllmi have published the following:

- Les Enfants de l'Espoir : l'histoire des enfants réfugiés du Tibet. Paris: La Martinière. 1996. ISBN 978-2732422145.
- Les Bergers de l'hiver. Paris: La Martinière. 1999. ISBN 978-2732425900.
- Himalaya bouddhiste. Paris: La Martinière. 2002. ISBN 978-2732428741.
- Offrandes, 365 pensées de maîtres bouddhistes. Paris: La Martinière. 2003. ISBN 978-2732429663.
- Sagesses, 365 pensées de maîtres de l'Inde. Paris: La Martinière. 2004. ISBN 978-2744175329.
- Origines, 365 pensées de sages africains. Paris: La Martinière. 2005. ISBN 978-2860102872.
- Révélations, 365 pensées d'Amérique latine. Paris: La Martinière. 2006. ISBN 978-2732434216.
- Eveils, 365 pensées de sages d'Asie. Paris: La Martinière. 2007. ISBN 978-2732435732.
- Souffles, 365 pensées de sages d'Orient. Paris: La Martinière. 2008. ISBN 978-2732437408.
- Femmes d'Eternité. Paris: La Martinière. 2009. ISBN 978-2732440071.
- Espoirs, 365 clés de la pensée occidentale. Paris: La Martinière. 2009. ISBN 978-2732439495.
