= Khandro Lhamo =

Doctor of Tibetan medicine

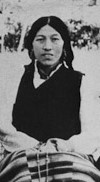
- Born: 1914; Kham Tibet
- Died: 30 March 2003 (aged 88–89); Nepal
- Spouse: Dilgo Khyentse
- Children: Chime Wangmo, Dechen Wangmo

Khandro Lhamo (Tibetan: མཁའ་འགྲོ་ལྷ་མོ་, Wylie: mkha' 'gro lha mo) (1914 - 30 March 2003) was a doctor (Amchi) of Traditional Tibetan medicine and a practitioner of Tibetan Buddhism. She was Dilgo Khyentse Rinpoche's partner and she helped to build and maintain Shechen Monastery in Nepal.

== Biography ==
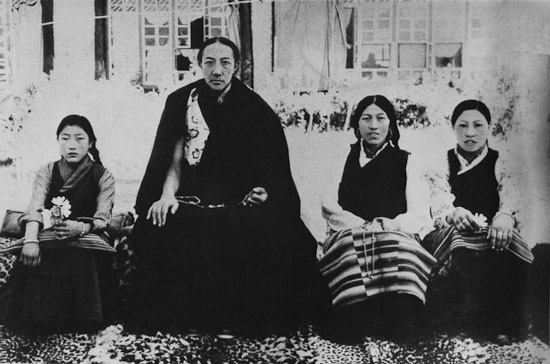
Dilgo Khyentse Family

Khandro Lhamo was born in Kham in eastern Tibet to a modest family in 1914. She married Dilgo Khyentse Rinpoche when she was nineteen years old and he was twenty-five years old. The marriage was arranged quickly since Dilgo Khyentse had fallen ill after an austere retreat and his teacher, Dzongsar Khyentse Chökyi Lodrö, prophesied that a wife would heal him (despite the fact he did not want to marry, even though as a tertön he could die at young age if he did not.). Khandro Lhamo did help him recover and was recognised as a ḍākinī. They travelled together whilst her husband undertook spiritual retreats; Lhamo also received Buddhist teachings with him in Tibet.

In the mid-1950s Chinese soldiers were searching for high tulkus, among them Dilgo Khyentse, especially in Kham. Khandro Lhamo hid his whereabouts for a few weeks while sending him messages. She finally grabbed a bag of tsampa and left the house, traveling to where he was teaching and they immediately departed for Lhasa. By 1959 and around the time of the March 1959 Tibetan uprising in Lhasa, they again escaped with their two daughters and a small group of disciples, and left Tibet to reach the border at Bhutan, where they stayed until given permission to cross into India. She and her family lived in Kalimpong with Dudjom Rinpoche until they moved to Bhutan in 1965.

Khandro Lhamo was a highly accomplished Doctor of Tibetan medicine, who after 1980 contributed to the construction and maintenance of Shechen Monastery in Nepal.

After the death of Dilgo Khyentse Rinpoche in 1991, she lived in the nunnery Shechen Orgyen Chodzong in Bhutan, and worked with Shechen Rabjam Rinpoche, their grandson, to develop the institution for ordained women.

Khandro Lhamo died on 30 March 2003 and was cremated in June 2003. Relics (kudun of her eyes, tongue and heart were kept.
