= Shechen Monastery =

Tibetan Buddhist monastery in Kathmandu, Nepal (formerly Langduo, Sichuan, China)

- Tibetan transcription(s); Tibetan: ཞེ་ཆེན་བསྟན་གཉིས་དར་རྒྱས་གླིང་། Wylie transliteration: Zhe-chen bsTan-gnyis-dar-rgyas-gling
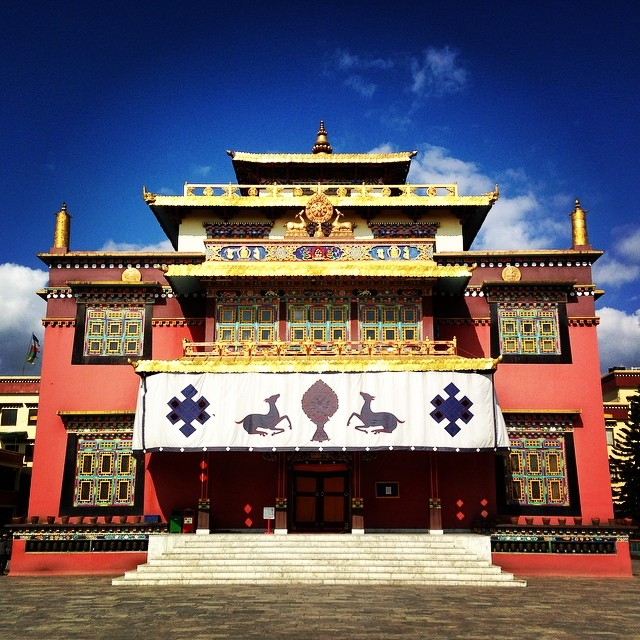

Religion
- Affiliation: Tibetan Buddhism
- Sect: Nyingma

Location
- Location: Langduo Township, Dege County, Sichuan, China, known as Kham
- Country: China
- Geographic coordinates: 32°15′58″N 98°53′10″E

Architecture
- Founder: Shechen Rabjam Tenpé Gyaltsen
- Established: 1695

Shechen Monastery (Tibetan: ཞེ་ཆེན་བསྟན་གཉིས་དར་རྒྱས་གླིང, Wylie: zhe chen bstan gnyis dar rgyas gling) is one of the "Six Mother Monasteries" of the Nyingma tradition of Tibetan Buddhism. It was originally located in Kham, Tibet, but was destroyed in the late 1950s during the Cultural Revolution and was rebuilt in Nepal in 1985.

== History ==
The original Shechen Monastery was located southwest of Langduo Township in Kham on the route to Dzogchen Monastery in what is now Dêgê County, Garzê Prefecture, Sichuan, China. It was founded in 1695 by the first Shechen Rabjam Tenpé Gyaltsen, though it is sometimes claimed to have been built by Gyurme Kunzang Namgyal, the second Shechen Rabjam, in 1734. It became extremely influential in the 18th and 19th centuries, with up to 160 satellite monasteries dotting the hillsides. The monastery was destroyed in the 1950s as part of the Communist Chinese government's Cultural Revolution.

In the 1980s, Dilgo Khyentse Rinpoche transplanted the rich tradition of the original Shechen Monastery to a new home near the great Stupa of Boudhanath in Kathmandu, Nepal.

== Shechen Monastery today ==
The monastery serves as the main seat of the Shechen tradition in exile. There are more than 300 monks at Shechen Monastery. The monastery teaches music, dance, painting and Buddhist philosophy. Its elementary school provides "a modern education for children between five and fourteen years of age."

The present Head is the seventh Shechen Rabjam Rinpoche, the grandson of Dilgo Khyentse. Prominent members of the monastery include the Yangsi (Tib.ཡང་སྲིད reincarnation) of Dilgo Khyentse, Khandro Lhamo, Matthieu Ricard and Changling Rinpoche.
