= Changling Rinpoche =

Tibetan Buddhist lineage

The Changling Rinpoche are a Tibetan Buddhist lineage, founded by the Tibetan Rechungpa who lived in the eleventh century. Rechungpa himself was a student of Milarepa.
