= Rechung Dorje Drakpa =

Illustration of Rechungpa

Rechung Dorje Drakpa (Tibetan: རས་ཆུང་རྡོ་རྗེ་གྲགས་པ་, Wylie: ras chung rdo rje grags pa, THL: ré chung dor jé drak pa, 1083/4-1161), known as Rechungpa, was one of the two most important students of the 11th century yogi and poet Milarepa and founder of the Rechung Kagyu subtradition of the Kagyu school of Tibetan Buddhism. (The other student was Gampopa, founder of the Dagpo Kagyu).

Rechungpa was particularly important in the transmission of the cycle of esoteric teachings of the Cakrasaṃvara Tantra known as the Demchok Nyéngyü (Wylie: bde mchog snyan brgyud), Réchung Nyéngyü (Wylie: ras chung snyan brgyud).

Tibetan Buddhists believe Rechungpa compiled The Six Equal Tastes from Indian sources. The text was hidden by Rechungpa, later recovered as a terma by Tsangpa Gyare, who founded the Drukpa Lineage.

Rechungpa's student Gyalwa Kyang Tsangpa transmitted the Rechung Kagyu lineage to the 12th century yogini Machik Ongyo. This lineage has been similarly transmitted without interruption until the present time. For example, Changling Rinpoche XV is one of the few holders of this lineage today, though in western teaching contexts he more frequently covers material from the "Northern Treasures" lineage of the Nyingma, which he also holds.

== Reference sources ==
- Roberts, Peter. Biographies of Rechungpa, Routledge, ISBN 978-0-415-76995-2 / ISBN 978-0415596220 (2010) (Peter Online)
- Thrangu Rinpoche: Rechungpa: A Biography of Milarepa's Disciple. Namo Buddha Publications, 2002, ISBN 0-9628026-8-9
