= Kyabje Rinpoche =

Monk and founder of Tibetan Buddhist Institute

Kyabje Khensur Kangurwa Lobsang Thubten Rinpoche
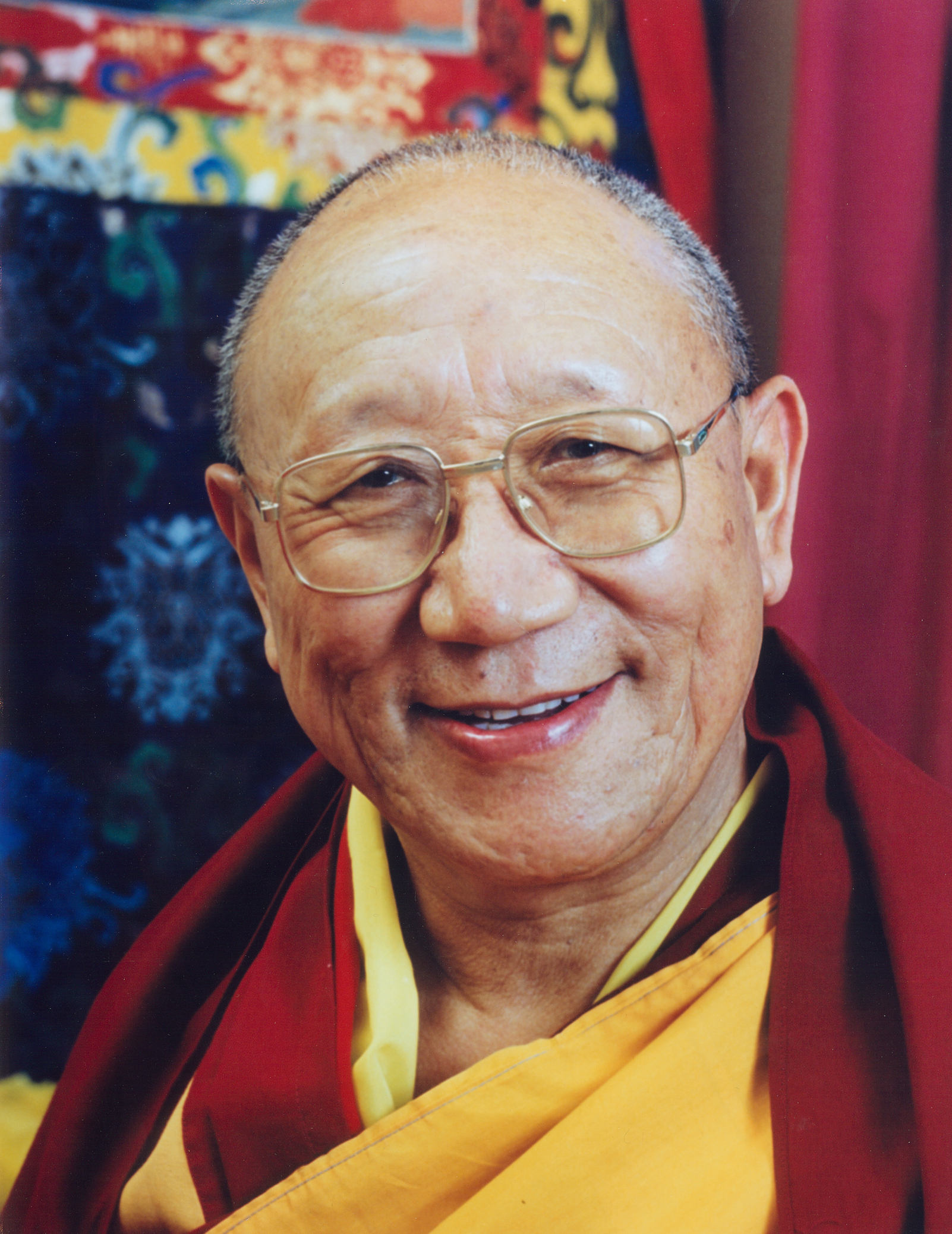
- Born: 25 December 1925; Rinda, Kham, Tibet
- Died: 22 January 2014 (aged 88); India
- Burial place: Sera Monastery
- Education: Sera Jey Monastery
- Occupation: Buddhist Lama
- Known for: Oral Transmission of the Complete Works of the Teachings of the Buddha; Tibetan Sponsorship Scheme; Re-establishment of Sera Je School; Founder of Tibetan Buddhist Institute and sponsorship scheme
- Title: Rinpoche
- Website: http://tibetanbuddhistinstitute.org/ http://tibetansponsorship.org/

Kyabje Khensur Kangurwa Lobsang Thubten Rinpoche (25 December 1925 – 22 January 2014), was a Buddhist monk, Abbot of Sera Jey Monastery, and the founder of Tibetan Buddhist Institute (Adelaide). Khensur means "former abbot" and Rinpoche means "precious teacher."

Former Abbot of Sera Je monastery, Holder of the transmission lineage of the Kangyur, considered widely as the greatest scholar of Abhidharma of his age and, perhaps, the foremost Vajrayogini practitioner, Kyabje Khensur Kangyur Rinpoche was one of the last great practitioners and scholars largely trained in Tibet. He was known at Sera Je as one of the "Three Greats."

Rinpoche taught all over the world including India, Australia, USA, New Zealand, Hong Kong and Singapore. Because of his extremely high qualifications, advanced knowledge and spiritual insights so rarely found in Lama's today, Rinpoche was often requested to teach at Sera monastery, where thousands of monks flocked to hear him speak.

His administrative achievements include his election first as the Sera Je disciplinarian and then, in 1982, his appointment as the monastery's abbot. His charitable achievements include the reestablishment of Sera Je School and founding of the Tibetan Sponsorship scheme.

He was born to a farming family in a mountainous valley of eastern Tibet (Kham) in what is now the Kartse (Ganzi) Prefecture of Western Sichuan. This area was the birthplace of many great lamas of contemporary times, including Khensur Rinpoche Urgyen Tseten, the late Geshe Ngawang Dhargye and the late Geshe Rabten, teacher of many leading western scholars of Tibetan Buddhism.

Rinpoche was not a recognised reincarnation (tulku). However, at a very early age, he displayed signs that he very likely was the reincarnation of someone of great spiritual attainment. Among these were an affinity for religious ceremonies such as pujas.

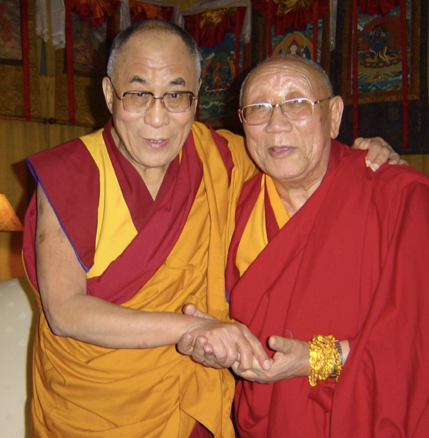
Dalai Lama (left) Kyabje Rinpoche (right)

== Early life, family and village ==
Kyabje Rinpoche was born in a village called Rinda which had about 30 houses and some 300 people. Nearby was Dhargey Gompa, the local monastery. Rinpoche's family had ten members i.e. two elder sisters, himself and various other close relatives. His mother died when he was two or three years old from a disease which turned her hands black. His sister Dolma then took care of the family.

His home was confiscated by the Chinese when they invaded Tibet. Rinpoches's village celebrated the various festivals including Saka Dawa, Lama Tsongkhapa Day, Jan chub cho je (celebrating the founder of Sera Monastery), Monlam and Losar (Tibetan New Year). Rinpoche was a little boy of about three when his first spiritual teacher, Kushog Gyalden Rinpoche cut his hair and gave him the name in religion, Lobsang Thubten. This was done with the understanding that he would become a monk in the future.

== Dhargey Gompa and ordination ==
At the age of seven he entered his first monastery Dhargey Gompa, two hours away by foot or 1/2 hour by horse, where his hair was shaved off. There were around 1900 monks from all three main Lhasa Monastic universities, including seven high Tulkus (reincarnations), and although the young monks (including Rinpoche) called themselves monks, they did not take the novice monk ordination (getshul) until they were older. He stayed there for 1 1/2 yrs until the Nationalist Chinese army invaded and completely destroyed the monastery. He then returned home to informal schooling. Some months later, he moved into a small school established by Gyalden Rinpoche with four other students from Dharye Gompa.

Rinpoche left Dhargey in 1944 to study at Sera Monastic University in Lhasa, remaining there for 18 years. In the meantime, Dhargey Gompa was rebuilt, only to be destroyed again around 1965 by the Chinese communists. There were about 300 elder monks and 100 younger ones, under Gyalden Tulku, the current incarnation of Rinpoche's first teacher, Gyalden Rinpoche. Rinpoche returned home in 1940, his father having died six months beforehand, spending some time at the rebuilt Dhargey Gompa. In 1965, he completed his Lharampa Geshe, the highest possible degree in Buddhist Philosophic Studies.

== Sera Monastery in Tibet ==
In February 1944, Rinpoche headed for Sera Monastery, one of three famous monasteries in Lhasa. Sera is dedicated to the Gelugpa or Yellow Hat Sect, a branch of Tibetan Buddhism and at the time Rinpoche entered, it had 5,500 monks. When he was 18 yrs old, Rinpoche took the first step to become a Novice Monk, by making three full length prostrations before the Abbot, and was asked many questions to see if he was a suitable candidate for becoming a monk. He was then given a yellow protection thread and told that he should remain humble and study well. Thus he became a full Sera Jey monk.

In 1948, Rinpoche became a Gelong, a fully ordained Buddhist Monk, which meant he took the 253 precepts (vows). Mostly monks from Kham only studied in Lhasa for 3 years, then they returned to their former monastery. However, after returning from a pilgrimage, taken immediately after his full Ordination, his teachers advised him to stay at Sera longer to continue his studies and not return to Kham. By about 1949, Rinpoche was in class 5 and had about 30 students. In 1949 Rinpoche received both Yamantaka and later, Vajrayogini Initiations from Ling Rinpoche (later to become the Dalai Lamas teacher).

During the next 5 years (1949–53) Rinpoche had many problems because he did not have any money, and had to beg for food from his friends. There was not much food but he studied well because of this ... "they say that when you are hungry your mind is very alert".

In 1950 most of the monks at Sera became ill, and every day in Trehor Khamzen, 1 or 2 died, suffering from high fever. It spread through both colleges, and more than a hundred died. In 1958 the Chinese had invaded Tibet and the burning of monasteries and killing of monks had started. Cases of genocide was widespread, and the resistance movement had grown considerably.

== Escape to India ==
On 17 March 1959 the 14th Dalai Lama escaped in disguise and started his journey to Sikkim, India and Nepal. The day before, the Chinese had fired 2 tank bombs into the Norbulinka, and on 18 March bombs had landed at Sera, the day after he had escaped to India.

The situation in Lhasa had become desperate, and Rinpoche and Geshe Ngawang Dhargey went into Lhasa to see for themselves. Because of this, they were not in Sera when the Chinese had come to the monastery and arrested monks coming back from the city. In Lhasa, there were bombs, tanks fire, machine guns and flame throwers, especially around the Norbulinka. A day later, Rinpoche made the decision to leave, although many others senior monks did not, and most perished in the ensuing onslaught. There were 35 in the group, and only 3 Senior Monks. It was an honour that Rinpoche was asked to throw the Mo to find the way to go to lead them all to safety. Chinese aircraft were patrolling to see if there were any monks escaping ... "it was very frightening". The group travelled day and night for about a month. "Our feet hurt, our eyes were heavy and we had pains in our legs". We made it to Pempo and a Chinese plane appeared and started firing down on everyone around the village, many of whom were trying to escape.

Along the way, the group came across Rinpoche's teacher, Gyurme Urgyen Tsetan Rinpoche, and he then joined the party, making 4 Senior Monks in all. They reached Samye in the Lodkhar area, then ferried across a very large river in a yak hide boat. It was here that fortune smiled again. After taking a short detour to visit a Tara statue, they were given as much food as the donkeys could carry. It was extremely dangerous and now urgent that they leave Lodkhar. They eventually made the border into India, and arrived 24 days after the Dalai Lama's party. The locals were amazed to see that they had travelled across the mountains in winter which were covered in ice ... this was unheard of.

== Life in India ==
Buxa, south of Darjeeling was the area especially provided by the Indian Government for the refugees. Buxa had been a British prison for important people like Mahatma Gandhi and Pandit Nehru. Many monks, including Rinpoche, developed sores, diarrhoea and tuberculosis. Many died, and the rest were emaciated. At first many different countries provided assistance but gradually the overseas countries ceased sending supplies and so it remained the Government of India's responsibility ... "the rest of the world forgot us".

They stayed 11 years at Buxa and over this period the supplies became worse and worse. They were given very old, bad rice and weevily lentils. The flour was full of dead insects and everybody soon began to get sick. There were no fields to cultivate and no money. It was in the extremely harsh conditions that Rinpoche sat for his Geshe degree in 1963-4. Rinpoche had a dilemma, he could go into the study of tantra, or could stay and teach. If he did not teach, the teaching would degenerate. So he chose to stay and teach.

In 1966, he stayed for six months in Mussoorie where he received teachings on grammar and poetry, which became useful later for writing homages to various teachers and composing texts. He wrote several Long Life Prayers, including one for the reincarnation of his first teacher in Kham. Rinpoche stayed in Buxa until 1970, studying, doing retreats and receiving initiations. Because of the deplorable conditions, and that over a hundred of the older monks had died, and many many more had tuberculosis and other diseases, he developed a plan whereby all of us were to move to the new southern settlements and re-establish Sera Jey Monastery. Divinations were performed to see where each monastery should be located, there were 2 areas; one near Mysore at Bylakuppe and the other at Mundgod, both in Karnataka state. Monks from Kagur sect went to Bylakuppe.

== Relocation to Sera Monastery in India ==
Upon arrival, the 300 monks discovered they were to live in a jungle, and stayed in army tents. The monks worked extremely hard for 2–3 years to clear it, prepare ground for planting crops and construct buildings and road. The Indian government gave them 50-60 rupees each a month for food and expenses, and also stones from a nearby quarry for building rooms (small, with just enough room for 4 beds and a fireplace for cooking). There were only two people who did not work; the Abbot and Rinpoche. They were designated to teach, meditate and study. The monks, out of respect, would not let Rinpoche work. A Health Care centre was established and a dispensary, and the water was much better, and Tuberculous became slightly less prevalent, however fever, malaria, tropical sores and other illnesses from the warm climate was still present.

=== Oral Transmission of the Complete Works of the Teachings of the Buddha ===
In April 1972, Rinpoche was asked to give the Oral Transmission of the Complete Works of the Teachings of the Buddha, 108 volumes each 400 to 500 pages, which took about 8 months, and given in Dharmsala. This is an extremely rare teaching, and for this reason he now bears the title of Kangyurwa. After completing the Kangurwa, he returned to Sera in early 1973 and was appointed by the Dalai Lama to the position of Gigue, Disciplinarian of Sera Je. It is usual to be in this position for 6 months, however Rinpoche held the position for 2 years. It was at this time that Tenzin (Nawang Thubten), Rinpoche's attendant, became a monk. He was only 5 years old at the time.

=== Roles ===
Rinpoche was both Sera disciplinarian and teacher at Sera. As Gigue, Rinpoche was able to start up again the debating system used at Sera in Tibet. These debates provide an excellent means of exploring the teachings of the Buddha and expanding one's knowledge of them.

In December 1979, Rinpoche started a 3.3 year retreat on Vajrayogini. During this time, Rinpoche was visited by Ling Rinpoche and Trichang Dorje Chang, the Dalai Lama's tutors. He was very honoured by this visit and rare to have a visitor whilst on a retreat.

In 1982, after finishing the retreat, Rinpoche was asked to teach at Tushita Institute in New Delhi, which was for local Indians and Westerners. Rinpoche had first taught western monks Buddhist philosophy in Sera Je before going to Tushita Centre.

The current Abbot at Sera asked to be excused from his position, so they had to appoint a new one. The monks vote first, and Geshe Rabten received the most, then Rinpoche. The highest six names are then taken to Dharmsala and presented to the Dalai Lama. Through his divination, Rinpoche was chosen as Abbot of Sera from July 1983 until June 1987. The Abbot has to take care of everything, including the overseeing the building projects, the buying of supplies for the monastery, meeting with business people and many meetings of the various Abbots to decide the future of the study programs in India.

=== Sera Je School ===
In 1984, during his time as abbot, Rinpoche restructured Sera Je School, which has resulted in an extremely high standard and diverse curriculum, achieving exemplary results in examinations. Because it was only for monks, many children from the nearby Tibetan settlements became monks in order to attend.

== Australia ==
Rinpoche settled in Adelaide South Australia to teach at Buddha-house, an FPMT centre in Fullarton. Rinpoche was asked to teach at many other FPMT centres in Australasia and overseas. By doing this, Rinpoche was fulfilling the wish of the 14th Dalai Lama, to spread the Buddha Dharma to as many sentient beings as possible. Rinpoche taught twice a week on most of the Buddhist Canon, and gave many Initiations and retreats. Rinpoche initially only planned to teach at BuddhaHouse in Adelaide for a year, but stayed as the resident spiritual teacher for over a decade. Under Rinpoche's guidance, BuddhaHouse grew in stability, prosperity and educational strength.

A highlight of Rinpoche's Australian stay was the visit in May 1992 of the Dalai Lama to Australia. As the senior resident monk it was Rinpoche's privilege to welcome him and accompany him around much of the country. "To be here in a western city so far away from Tibet welcoming the Dalai Lama was very strange. In Tibet it was almost impossible to sit next to him as I did in the Adelaide cathedral, and making a speech of welcome would have been impossible".

== Tibetan Buddhist Institute (TBI) ==
The Tibetan Buddhist Institute was established in April 2005 by Kyabje Rinpoche, in order to fulfil the wishes of the 14th Dalai Lama of Tibet. In March 2009, Tibetan Buddhist Institute found a home with the purchase of the Uniting Church building at Flinders Park South Australia.

=== Geshe Jampa Gyaltsen ===
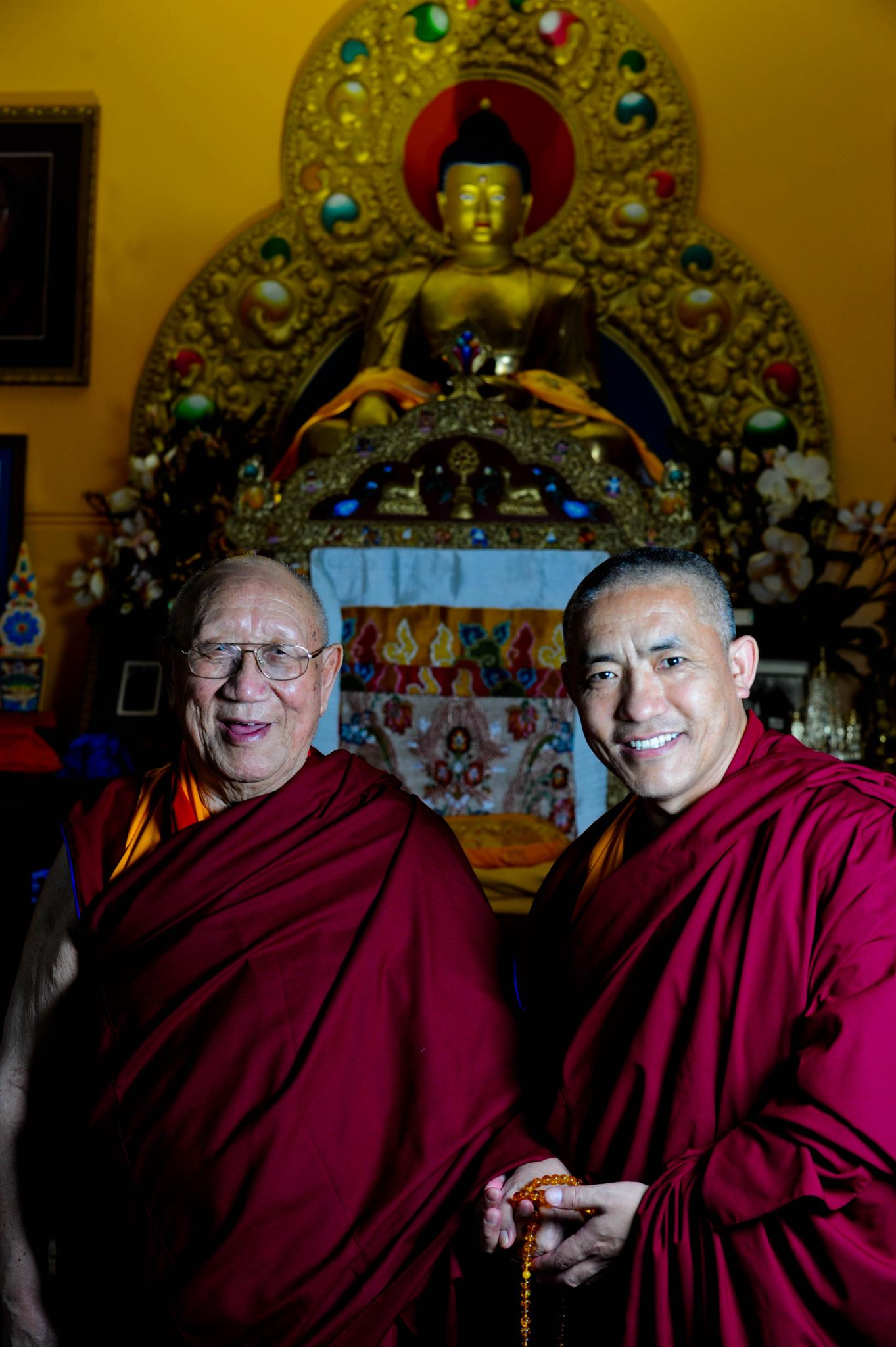
Kyabje Rinpoche (left) and Geshe Jampa Gyaltsen (right)

Geshe Jampa Gyaltsen is a student of Rinpoche and is now the resident teacher at Tibetan Buddhist Institute. Geshe Jampa Gyaltsen was born in 1966 and raised in the Tibetan village of Rumbatsa, within the broader district of Trěhor Kham, original site of the now legendary Dhargyay Monastery, and birthplace of founder Khensur Kangyurwa Rinpoche Lobsang Thubten, along with several other great Tibetan scholar-yogis of the 20th century.

=== Dalai Lama visit to Tibetan Buddhist Institute ===
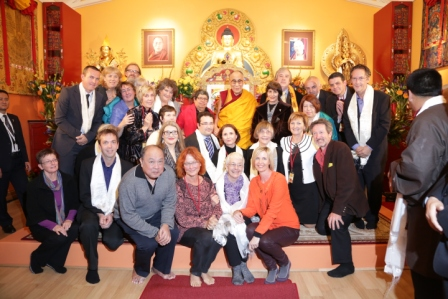
Dalai Lama at Tibetan Buddhist Institute June 2013

At the request of Rinpoche, the Dalai Lama visited the Tibetan Buddhist Institute in Adelaide Australia on Thursday 20 June 2013.

== Charitable works ==
=== Tibetan sponsorship scheme ===
In response the many requests from senior monks for assistance, Rinpoche established a monk sponsorship scheme. With over 950 monks, nuns, lay Tibetans in India and Gyalten Charity School in Tibet on the scheme (December 2005) and over 550 sponsors from 6 countries, the Khensur Kangyurwa Rinpoche Sponsorship Schemes is perhaps the largest and among the most successful Tibetan Sponsorship schemes in the world today. The Tibetan sponsorship scheme (previously Monk Sponsorship Scheme) was originally established to help support exiled monks at Sera Monastery escaping repression in Tibet, and also their relatives who live nearby in camps in India. Today the scheme sponsors exiled Monks, Nuns and lay Tibetans in India, Nuns, at two nunneries in Tibet, and students at Gyalten Charity School in Tibet.

=== Monastery in Kham, Dhargye Gompa ===
Rinpoche has also successfully helped to raise funds to rebuild his first monastery in Kham, Dhargye Gompa, which was destroyed twice during the Chinese invasion and occupation. In addition, he has raised money to support the important philosophical debating program at Sera Je.

Gyalten Charity School in Tibet has approximately 280 children are enrolled in the school. Mostly monks are sponsored in Rinpoche's schemes, however there are also nuns in India as well as nuns at Nyagye Nunnery in Tibet and many Lay Tibetans in India. Khensur Rinpoche also set up the Emergency Medical Fund, which was established for any monk or lay Tibetan in India that is in urgent need of medical assistance.

== Death and reincarnation ==
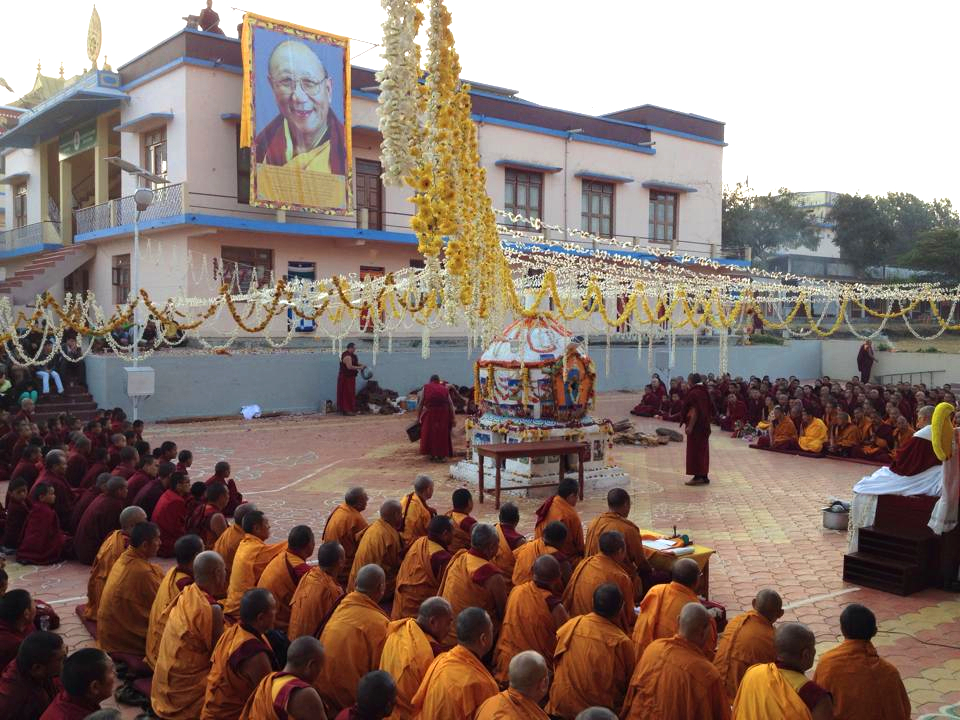
Cremation Ceremony Sera Monastery

On 31 December 2013, the Dalai Lama, personally visited the former abbot of Sera Je Monastery, Thubten Rinpoche just prior to his death (video) at his Labrang.

Rinpoche died on 22 January 2014 in India. The cremation ceremony and offering of a fire puja to Kyabje Khensur Kangur Lobsang Thubten Rinpoche's Holy Body, was held at Sera Monastery and attended by hundreds of monks and lay people. In January 2016 one hundred Geshes in Rinpoche's Labrang at Sera Jey Monastic University dedicated a Heruka Guru Puja for his reincarnation.

== Books and published works ==
=== The Bodhicittavivarana by Nagarjuna ===
The Bodhicittavivarana by Nagarjuna with commentary of Khensur Kangyur Lobsang thubten in conjunction with a rare 14th century commentary, Ngawang dragpa's ‘Garland of Jewels’, as well as the oral commentary of the lineage holder of the Tripiûaka,

=== Buddha House to Buddhahood ===
In 1994 teachings of Khensur Rinpoche were printed in the book Buddha House to Buddhahood: teachings during the wood-dog year at Buddha House Centre for Advanced Buddhist Studies / Kagyurwa Geshe Khenzur Lozang Thubten Rinpoche.

=== Jamgon Publishing ===
Jamgon Publications was established support the publication of bilingual Tibetan-English editions, of the works of Kyabje Rinpoche, lineage-holder of the Kangyur (the totality of the Buddhist corpus attributed to Buddha Shakyamuni).

=== Biography ===
Kyabje Rinpoche and Jen Gibson, 2000; Unpublished Work "Fire and Stone; The Life of a Tibetan Abbot"

== See also ==
- Tibetan Buddhism
  - Gelug
    - List of Dalai Lamas
    - Panchen Lama
- History of Tibet
  - List of rulers of Tibet
  - 14th Dalai Lama
