= Trulshik Rinpoche =

Buddhist Lama (1924–2011)

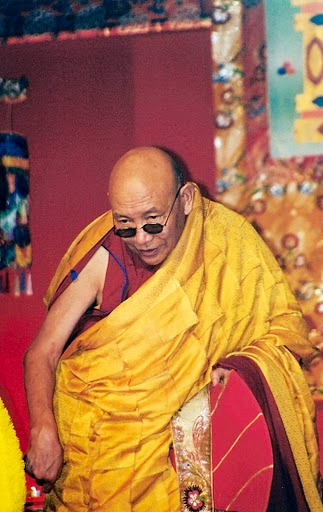
Trulshik Rinpoché, France, 2000

Trulshik Rinpoche Ngawang Chökyi Lodrö ('khrul zhig ngag dbang chos kyi blo gros) (1 January 1923 – 2 September 2011) born in Yardrok Taklung, Central Tibet was one of the main teachers of the 14th Dalai Lama and of many of the younger generation of Nyingma lamas today including Sogyal Rinpoche. He is considered the spiritual heir of several senior Nyingma masters of the last century such as Dudjom Rinpoche and Dilgo Khyentse Rinpoche. Rinpoche is the subject of a documentary film Destroyer of Illusion narrated by Richard Gere. Trulshik Rinpoche founded the monastery of Thubten Chöling in Nepal. In 2010 he became the official head of the Nyingma school.

Rinpoche lived in Solukhumbu, Nepal.

Trulshik Rinpoche died on September 2, 2011, and was succeeded by Taklung Tsetrul Rinpoche who accepted the position on 22 March 2012.

His reincarnation, or Yangsi, Ngawang Tendzin Lodrö Rabsel (Tib. ངག་དབང་བསྟན་འཛིན་བློ་གྲོས་རབ་གསལ་), was born in Kathmandu on July 25, 2013, and recognized in 2015.
