= Jean-François Revel =

French writer and philosopher (1924–2006)

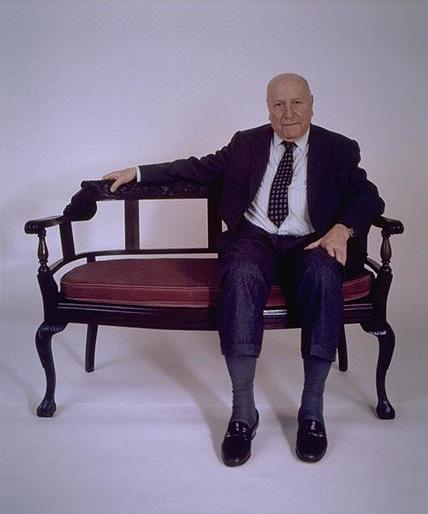
- Revel in 1999
- Born: Jean-François Ricard; 19 January 1924; Marseille, France
- Died: 30 April 2006 (aged 82); Kremlin-Bicêtre, France
- Education: Lycée du Parc; École normale supérieure
- Spouse(s): Claude Sarraute; Yahne le Toumelin
- Children: Matthieu Ricard; Nicolas Revel
- Writing career
- Language: French

Jean-François Revel (French pronunciation: [ʒɑ̃ fʁɑ̃swa ʁəvɛl]; born Jean-François Ricard; 19 January 1924 – 30 April 2006) was a French philosopher, journalist, and author. A prominent public intellectual, Revel was a socialist in his youth but later became a prominent European proponent of classical liberalism and free market economics. He was a member of the Académie française after June 1998. He is best known for his book Without Marx or Jesus: The New American Revolution Has Begun, published in French in 1970.

== Early life and education ==
Jean-François Ricard was born in Marseille in 1924 into a prosperous middle-class family. During the German occupation of France in World War II, the adolescent Ricard participated in the French Resistance. He would later note that his reaction against the disgraceful, officious manner of French collaborators had an impact on his approach to writing. Ricard began to use "Revel" as a literary pseudonym, eventually adopting it as his legal surname.

Revel moved to Lyon to prepare at the Lycée du Parc for the competitive entrance examination to the École normale supérieure (ENS), where he was admitted in 1943. At the ENS, Revel studied philosophy and in 1956 passed the rigorous agrégation that qualified him to teach the subject in French public secondary schools.

== Career ==
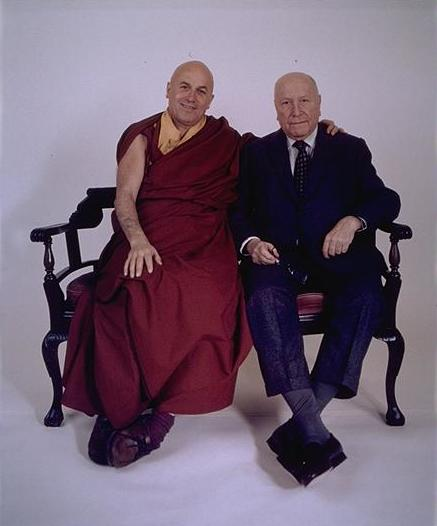
Revel with his son in 1999.

Revel began his career teaching philosophy in French Algeria and in French secondary schools in Italy and Mexico, before settling in Lille. He quit teaching in 1963 and embarked on his career a journalist, author, and public intellectual. Among other positions in the press, he was chief literary editor for France Observateur and later for L'Express.

A socialist until the late 1960s, Revel was a speechwriter for socialist politician François Mitterrand. Revel ran as a socialist candidate in the parliamentary elections of 1967, which he lost. Later, however, Revel became known, particularly in the context of the Cold War, as a champion of classical liberal values such as liberty and democracy at a time when many pre-eminent European intellectuals praised Communism or Maoism. The publication of his 1970 book, Without Marx or Jesus: The New American Revolution Has Begun signalled the transition of his views to liberal "philosopher of freedom in the tradition of Raymond Aron." In 1973, he was one of the signers of the Humanist Manifesto II.

In 1975, he delivered the Huizinga Lecture in Leiden, Netherlands, under the title La tentation totalitaire (English: The Totalitarian Temptation). In 1986, Revel he received an honorary doctorate degree from the Universidad Francisco Marroquín, in Guatemala, for his commitment to individual freedom. From 1998 to 2006, he was president of the Institut d'Histoire Sociale. His successor is Emmanuel Le Roy Ladurie.

A year after the September 11 attacks of 2001, Revel published Anti-Americanism, a book in which he criticized anti-Americanism and Europeans who argued that the United States had brought the terrorist attacks upon itself by misguided foreign policies: "Obsessed by their hatred and floundering in illogicality, these dupes forget that the United States, acting in its own self-interest, is also acting in the interest of us Europeans and in the interests of many other countries which are threatened, or have already been subverted and ruined, by terrorism."

== Personal life ==
He was survived by his second wife, Claude Sarraute, a journalist, and has three sons from two marriages. His first marriage to painter Yahne le Toumelin ended in divorce.

One of his sons, Matthieu Ricard, is a well-known Buddhist monk who studied molecular biology at the Pasteur Institute before converting to Tibetan Buddhism. Father and son jointly authored a book Le moine et le philosophe (The Monk and the Philosopher) about the son's conversion and Buddhism. Another son, Nicolas Revel, is a high-ranking functionary in the French civil service, and as of 2020 the director of the cabinet of the Prime Minister of France.

== Accusation of pedo-criminality ==
In June 2024, Jean-François Revel was named in an investigation by the French newspaper Libération into the "men of rue du Bac". According to the daily, on 23 October 2023, the Paris public prosecutor's office opened a preliminary investigation into accusations that these "men" had repeatedly sexually abused Inès Chatin over several years when she was a child (aged 4 to 13).

The abuses and rapes were allegedly committed by a pedocriminal network, between 1977 and 1987. This network is said to have included her adoptive father, Jean-François Lemaire, and several of his friends. Chatin says that Revel was among masked men who watched on as she and other children were abused when she was aged between 4 and 7.

In March 2025 the daily Le Figaro carried out its own investigation into the allegations, pointing out the lack of evidence against Revel. Earlier, Pierre Boncenne and Henri Astier accused Libération of biased reporting in an article published by the quarterly Commentaire.

== Thought ==
Belgian-Australian essayist and sinologist Simon Leys notes that "...what strikingly set [Revel] apart from most other intellectuals of his generation was his genuinely cosmopolitan outlook", as "on international affairs, on literature, art and ideas, he had universal perspectives that broke completely from the suffocating provincialism of the contemporary Parisian elites."

Of Revel's political thought, Clive James wrote that while he was "always characterized by the bien pensant left as a die-hard right-winger", he was "in fact a liberal democrat who was genuinely concerned that doctrinaire gauchiste measures would leave the underprivileged less privileged than ever."

== Reception ==
In his book Cultural Amnesia, Clive James writes that "no political commentator anywhere is so consistently entertaining on such a high level", arguing that Revel writes in a style that is "gratifyingly clear in its structure, memorable for its vivid imagery, and consistently funny".

== Legacy ==
In 2006, journalist and former editor-in-chief of Lire Pierre Boncenne published Pour Jean-François Revel ("In Defense of Jean-François Revel"), which received the Renaudot Prize for Essays.

In 2018, Jean-François Revel was included by Mario Vargas Llosa in his essay The Call of The Tribe, which explores liberalism and the works of liberal thinkers that influenced Vargas Llosa.

== Bibliography ==
- Revel, Jean-François (1958). Pourquoi les philosophes ?. (awarded Fénéon Prize)
- Revel, Jean-François (1958). Pour l'Italie.
- Revel, Jean-François (1972). Without Marx or Jesus. Doubleday. ISBN 0-440-59729-3 – via Internet Archive.
- Revel, Jean-François (1976). Sur Proust.
- Revel, Jean-François (1976). The Totalitarian Temptation.
- Revel, Jean-François (1983). How Democracies Perish. Perennial Library. ISBN 0060970111.
- Revel, Jean-François (1982). Culture and cuisine : a journey through the history of food. Doubleday. ISBN 0-385151071.
- Revel, Jean-François (1992). The Flight from Truth: The Reign of Deceit in the Age of Information. Random House. ISBN 0-394-57643-8.
- Revel, Jean-François (1993). Democracy Against Itself: The Future of the Democratic Impulse/Regain démocratique. Free Press. ISBN 0-02-926387-5.
- Revel, Jean-François; Ricard, Matthieu (1999). The Monk and the Philosopher : A Father and Son Discuss the Meaning of Life. Knopf Doubleday Publishing. ISBN 0-8052-1103-9.
- Revel, Jean-François (2000). La Grande Parade: essai sur la survie de l'utopie socialiste. Paris: Éditions Plon. ISBN 2259190561. OL 6852556M.
- Revel, Jean-François (2003). The Anti-American Obsession: Its Functioning, Its Causes, Its Inconsequentialness/La obsesión antiamericana. Encounter Books. ISBN 1-893554-85-6.
- Revel, Jean-François (2003). Europe's Anti-American Obsession. The American Enterprise Institute. Archived from the original on 4 December 2003.
- Revel, Jean-François (2003). Anti-Americanism. San Francisco: Encounter Books. ISBN 1-59403-060-X.
- Revel, Jean-François (2009). Last Exit to Utopia: The Survival of Socialism in a Post-Soviet Era/Le Grande Parade. New York City, New York: Encounter Books. ISBN 9781594032646. OCLC 320952665.

Cultural offices
Preceded by Étienne Wolff	Seat 24; Académie française 1997-2006	Succeeded by Max Gallo
