= Matthieu Ricard =

French writer and Buddhist monk

- माथ्यु रिका
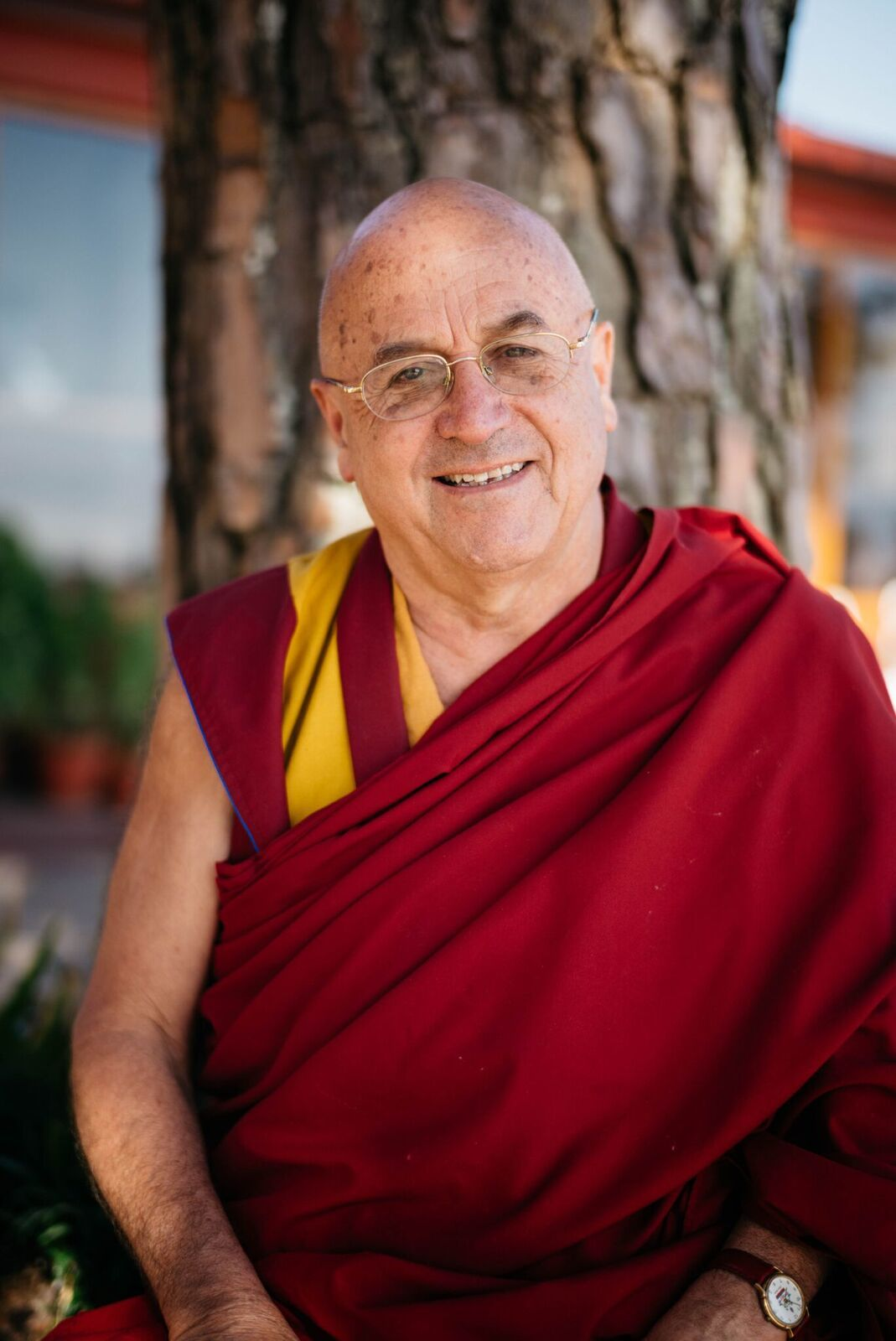

Personal life
- Born: 15 February 1946 (age 80) Aix-les-Bains, Savoie, France
- Education: Pasteur Institute (PhD molecular genetics)
- Occupation: Buddhist monk; writer; translator; photographer
- Website: MatthieuRicard.org

Religious life
- Religion: Buddhism
- School: Vajrayana

Senior posting
- Teacher: Kangyur Rinpoche; Dilgo Khyentse Rinpoche

Matthieu Ricard (French pronunciation: [matjø ʁikaʁ]; Nepali: माथ्यु रिका, born 15 February 1946) is a Nepalese French writer, photographer, translator and Buddhist monk who resides at Shechen Tennyi Dargyeling Monastery in Nepal.

Matthieu Ricard grew up among the personalities and ideas of French intellectual circles. He received a PhD degree in molecular genetics from the Pasteur Institute in 1972. He then decided to forsake his scientific career and instead practice Tibetan Buddhism, living mainly in the Himalayas.

Ricard is a board member of the Mind and Life Institute. He received the French National Order of Merit for his humanitarian work in the East with Karuna-Shechen, the non-profit organization he co-founded in 2000 with Rabjam Rinpoche. Since 1989, he has acted as the French interpreter for the 14th Dalai Lama. Since 2010, he has been travelling and giving a series of talks with and assisting in teachings by Dilgo Khyentse Rinpoche, the incarnation of Kyabje Dilgo Khyentse Rinpoche.

== Life ==
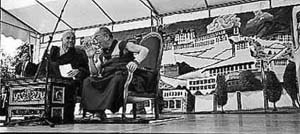
Matthieu Ricard and the Dalai Lama in 2000

Born in Aix-les-Bains, Savoie, France, he is the son of the late Jean-François Revel (born Jean-François Ricard), a renowned French philosopher. His mother is the lyrical abstractionist painter and Tibetan Buddhist nun Yahne Le Toumelin. Matthieu Ricard grew up among the personalities and ideas of French intellectual circles.

Ricard worked for a PhD degree in molecular genetics at the Pasteur Institute under French Nobel Laureate François Jacob. After completing his doctoral thesis in 1972, Ricard decided to forsake his scientific career and concentrate on the practice of Tibetan Buddhism.

Ricard then went to India where he lived in the Himalayas studying with the Kangyur Rinpoche and some other teachers of that tradition. He became a close student and friend of Dilgo Khyentse Rinpoche until Rinpoche's death in 1991. Since then, Ricard has dedicated his activities to fulfilling Khyentse Rinpoche's vision.

Ricard has been called the "happiest person in the world". Matthieu Ricard was a volunteer subject in a study performed at the University of Wisconsin–Madison on happiness, scoring significantly above the average of hundreds of volunteers. Ricard, however, has called the label "absurd" and untrue.

He co-authored a study on the brains of long-term meditators, including himself, who had undergone a minimum of three years in retreat.

Ricard is a board member of the Mind and Life Institute, which is devoted to meetings and collaborative research between scientists, Buddhist scholars and meditators, his contributions have appeared in Destructive Emotions (edited by Daniel Goleman) and other books of essays. He is engaged in research on the effect of mind training on the brain, in various institutions, including Madison-Wisconsin, Princeton and Berkeley universities in the United States, the Max Planck Institute in Leipzig, Germany, the University of Liège in Belgium, and at the Inserm centres of Lyon and Caen in France.

Ricard spent four years in the Dordogne, caring for his mother, Yahne, who died 2023 in her hundredth year; he felt very fortunate to be able to care for her during this time.

== Publishing ==
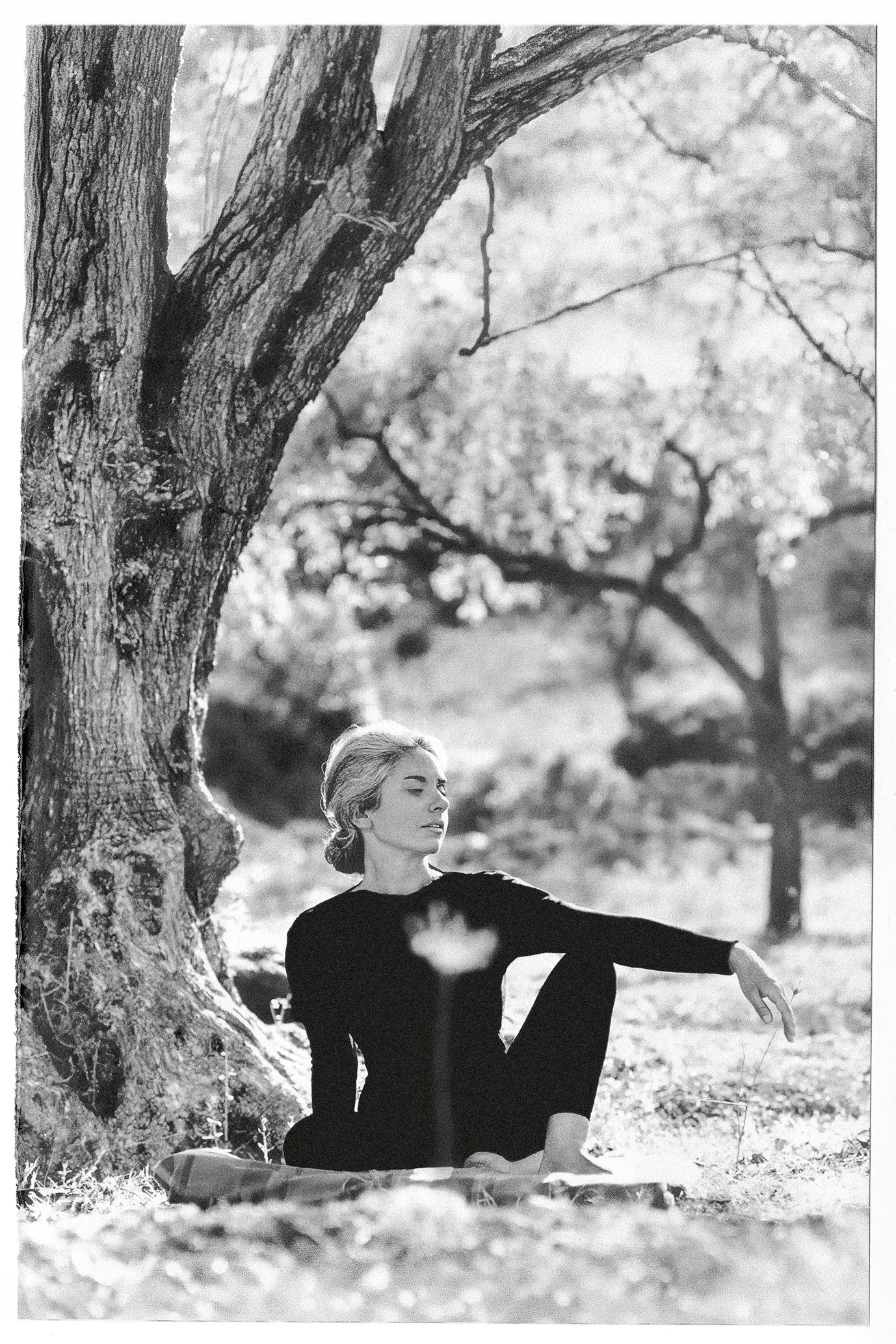
Matthieu Ricard's early photographic work: Portrait of the yogini Eva Ruchpaul in 1967.

Ricard's photographs of the spiritual masters, the landscape, and the people of the Himalayas have appeared in numerous books and magazines. Henri Cartier-Bresson has said of his work, "Matthieu's camera and his spiritual life make one, and from this springs these images, fleeting and eternal." He is the author and photographer of Tibet, An Inner Journey and Monk Dancers of Tibet, in collaboration with Danielle Föllmi and also Buddhist Himalayas, Journey to Enlightenment and Motionless Journey: From a Hermitage in the Himalayas. He is the translator of numerous Buddhist texts, including The Life of Shabkar.

The dialogue with his father, Jean-Francois Revel, The Monk and the Philosopher, was a best seller in Europe and was translated into 21 languages, and The Quantum and the Lotus (coauthored with Trinh Xuan Thuan) reflects his long-standing interest in science and Buddhism. His 2003 book Plaidoyer pour the bonheur (published in English in 2006 as Happiness: A Guide to Developing Life's Most Important Skill) explores the meaning and fulfillment of happiness and was a major best-seller in France.

In June 2015, the English translation of Altruism: The Power of Compassion to Change Yourself and the World was published and excerpted as the cover story of Spirituality & Health Magazine.

Ricard is the also the author of Caring Economics: Conversations on Altruism and Compassion, Between Scientists, Economists, and the Dalai Lama (forthcoming 2015).

== Awards and other activities ==
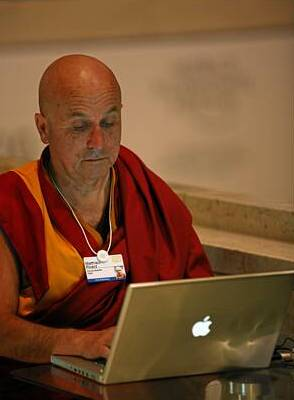
Davos-Klosters, Switzerland, 30 January 2009 – Matthieu Ricard works on a laptop during the World Economic Forum annual meeting.

Ricard received the French National Order of Merit for his humanitarian work in the East. He donates all proceeds from his books and conferences, as well as much of his time to over 200 humanitarian projects in Nepal, India and Tibet (www.karuna-shechen.org) which serve over 300,000 beneficiaries every year in the fields of health care, education and social service. He is also active for the preservation of the Himalayan cultural heritage (www.shechen.org). Since 1989, he has acted as the French interpreter for the Dalai Lama.

Ricard has spoken on many international forums, including the World Happiness Forum, the United-Nations (as part of the Gross National Happiness resolution proposed by Bhutan), conferences held in Sydney, London, San Francisco and Singapore, the Global Economic Symposium, The World Government Summit and other venues. He has been invited ten times to the World Economic Forum.

== Personal meditation practice ==
Ricard uses three types of meditation: compassion, open awareness, and analytic. He has spent a total of 5 years in solitary meditation, largely in a remote mountain hut.

== Publications ==
=== Essays and books ===
- Ricard, Matthieu (1969). Animal Migration. [New York]: [Hill and Wang].
- Revel, Jean-François; Ricard, Matthieu (1999). The Monk and the Philosopher. New York City: Schocken. ISBN 978-0-8052-1103-0.
- Ricard, Matthieu (2001). The Spirit of Tibet: The Life and World of Khyentse Rinpoche, Spiritual Teacher. Aperture. ISBN 978-0-89381-903-3.
- Ricard, Matthieu (2002). The Quantum and the Lotus. New York City: Crown Publishing. ISBN 978-1-4000-8079-3. With Trinh Xuan Thuan.
- Ricard, Matthieu (2006). Happiness, A Guide to Developing Life's Most Important Skill. New York City: Little Brown. ISBN 978-0-316-16725-3.
- Ricard, Matthieu; Föllmi, Olivier (2008). Buddhist Himalayas. New York City: Harry N. Abrams. ISBN 978-0-8109-8405-9.
- Ricard, Matthieu (2008). Motionless Journey: From a Hermitage in the Himalayas. London: Thames & Hudson. ISBN 978-0-500-54352-8.
- Ricard, Matthieu (2010). Why Meditate ?. New York City: Hay House. ISBN 978-1-4019-2663-2.
- Ricard, Matthieu (2011). The Art of Meditation. New York City: Paperback. ISBN 978-0-85789-274-4.
- Ricard, Matthieu (2012). Tibet: An Inner Journey. London: Thames & Hudson. ISBN 978-0-500-28905-1.
- Ricard, Matthieu (2012). Bhutan: The Land of Serenity. London: Thames & Hudson. ISBN 978-0-500-29044-6.
- Ricard, Matthieu (2013). On the Path to Enlightenment: Heart Advice from the Great Tibetan Masters. New York City: Shambhala.
- Ricard, Matthieu; Singer, Tania (2015). Caring Economics: Conversations on Altruism and Compassion. London: Macmillan.
- Ricard, Matthieu (2015). Altruism: The Power of Compassion to Change Yourself and the World. New York City: Little, Brown and Company. ISBN 978-0-316-20824-6.
- Ricard, Matthieu (2016). A Plea for the Animals: The Moral, Philosophical, and Evolutionary Imperative to Treat All Beings with Compassion. Boulder: Shambhala Publications. ISBN 978-0-8348-4054-6.
- Ricard, Matthieu (2016). An Ode To Beauty. Paris: La Martinière / Yellow Korner.
- Ricard, Matthieu; Singer, Wolf (2017). Beyond the Self: Conversations between Buddhism and Neuroscience. Cambridge (USA): MIT Press. ISBN 978-0-262-03694-8.
- Ricard, Matthieu; André, Christophe; Jollien, Alexandre (2018). In Search of Wisdom. New York: Soundstrue.
- Ricard, Matthieu, Simon Velez (2019) Contemplation. Martiniere BL
- Ricard, Matthieu; Gruhl, Jason; Hall, Becca (2020). Our Animal Neighbors. New York City: Shambhala.
- Ricard, Matthieu Christophe André, Alexandre Jollien (2020) Freedom for All of Us: A Monk, a Philosopher, and a Psychiatrist on Finding Inner Peace, Sounds True. ISBN 9781683644828
- Ricard, Matthieu; (2023) Notebooks of a Wandering Monk MIT Press ISBN 978-0262048293

=== Translation works ===
- Dilgo Khyentse Rinpoche (1996). The Excellent Path to Enlightenment: Oral Teachings on the Root Text of Jamyang Khyentse Wangpo by Dilgo Khyentse Rinpoche. New York City: Snow Lion. ISBN 978-1-55939-064-4.
- Shabkar Tsogdruk Rangdrol; Ricard, Matthieu; Padmakara Translation Group (2001). The Life of Shabkar: The Autobiography of a Tibetan Yogin. New York City: Snow Lion. ISBN 978-1-55939-154-2.
- Shabkar Tsogdruk Rangdrol; Ricard, Matthieu (2002). Rainbows Appear: Tibetan Poems of Shabkar. New York City: Shambhala. ISBN 978-1-57062-982-2.
- Dilgo Khyentse Rinpoche; Padampa Sangye; Padmakara Translation Group (2006). The Hundred Verses of Advice: Tibetan Buddhist Teachings on What Matters Most. New York City: Shambhala. ISBN 978-1-59030-341-2.
- Dilgo Khyentse Rinpoche; Padmakara Translation Group (2007). The Heart of Compassion: The Thirty-seven Verses on the Practice of a Bodhisattva. New York City: Shambhala. ISBN 978-1-59030-457-0.
- Dilgo Khyentse Rinpoche (2012). Guru Yoga According to the Preliminary Practice of Longchen Nyingtik. New York City: Shambhala.
- Ricard, Matthieu; Mipham, Jamgon (2013). On the Path to Enlightenment. New York City: Shambhala.
- Ricard, Matthieu (2016). Enlightened Vagabond, The Life and Teachings of Patrul Rinpoche. New York City: Shambhala Publications.

=== Articles ===
- Hirota, Yukinori; Ricard, Matthieu (October 1973). "Process of Cellular Division in Escherichia coli: Physiological Study on Thermosensitive Mutants Defective in Cell Division". Journal of Bacteriology. 116 (1): 314–322. doi:10.1128/JB.116.1.314-322.1973. PMC 246424. PMID 4583216.
- Ricard, M., On the relevance of a contemplative science. Buddhism and Science: Breaking New Grounds, 2003, 261–279.
- Lutz, A.; Greischar, L. L.; Rawlings, N. B.; Ricard, M.; Davidson, R. J. (2004). "Long-term meditators self-induce high-amplitude gamma synchrony during mental practice". Proceedings of the National Academy of Sciences. 101 (46): 16369–16373. Bibcode:2004PNAS..10116369L. doi:10.1073/pnas.0407401101. PMC 526201. PMID 15534199.
- Ekman, P., Davidson, R. J., Ricard, M. & Wallace, B. A., Buddhist and psychological perspectives on emotions and well-Being. Current Directions in Psychological Science 14, 2005, 59–63.
- Dambrun, Michael (2017). "Self-centeredness and selflessness: Happiness correlates and mediating psychological processes". PeerJ. 5 e3306. doi:10.7717/peerj.3306. PMC 5429736. PMID 28507820.
- Ricard, Matthieu (20 July 2011). "The Dalai Lama: Happiness through wisdom and compassion". International Journal of Wellbeing. 1 (2): 274–290. doi:10.5502/ijw.v1i2.9. Archived from the original on 29 October 2018.
- (in French) Dambrun, M., & Ricard, M., La transcendance de soi et the bonheur : une mise à l'épreuve du modèle du bonheur basé sur the soi centré-décentré. Les Cahiers Internationaux de Psychologie Sociale, 2012/1, no. 93, p. 89–102.
- Levenson, R. W.; Ekman, P.; Ricard, M. (2012). "Meditation and the Startle Response: A Case Study". Emotion. 12 (3): 650–658. doi:10.1037/a0027472. PMC 3742737. PMID 22506498.
- Klimecki, O. M.; Leiberg, S.; Ricard, M.; Singer, T. (2013). "Differential pattern of functional brain plasticity after compassion and empathy training". Social Cognitive and Affective Neuroscience. 9 (6): 873–879. doi:10.1093/scan/nst060. PMC 4040103. PMID 23576808.
- Ricard, M., Lutz, A., & Davidson, R. J., Mind of the meditator. Scientific American, 2014, 311(5), 38–45.
- McCall, C.; Steinbeis, N.; Ricard, M.; Singer, T. (2014). "Compassion meditators show less anger, less punishment, and more compensation of victims in response to fairness violations". Frontiers in Behavioral Neuroscience. 8: 424. doi:10.3389/fnbeh.2014.00424. PMC 4260514. PMID 25538589.
- Ahuvia, A., Thin, N., Haybron, D., Biswas-Diener, R., Ricard, M., & Timsit, J., Happiness: An Interactionist Perspective. International Journal of Wellbeing, 2015, 5(1).
- Chételat, Gaël; Mézenge, Florence; Tomadesso, Clémence; Landeau, Brigitte; Arenaza-Urquijo, Eider; Rauchs, Géraldine; André, Claire; De Flores, Robin; Egret, Stéphanie; Gonneaud, Julie; Poisnel, Géraldine; Chocat, Anne; Quillard, Anne; Desgranges, Béatrice; Bloch, Jean-Gérard; Ricard, Matthieu; Lutz, Antoine (2017). "Reduced age-associated brain changes in expert meditators: A multimodal neuroimaging pilot study". Scientific Reports. 7 (1): 10160. Bibcode:2017NatSR...710160C. doi:10.1038/s41598-017-07764-x. PMC 5578985. PMID 28860449.
- Engen, Haakon G.; Bernhardt, Boris C.; Skottnik, Leon; Ricard, Matthieu; Singer, Tania (2018). "Structural changes in socio-affective networks: Multi-modal MRI findings in long-term meditation practitioners". Neuropsychologia. 116 (Pt A): 26–33. doi:10.1016/j.neuropsychologia.2017.08.024. PMID 28842274. S2CID 24193477.
