= Shechen Gyaltsab =

Lineage-Holder

Shechen Gyaltsab (Tibetan: སེ་ཆེན་རྒྱལ་ཚབ; full name: Shechen Gyaltsab Gyurme Pema Namgyal; 1871–1926) was a principal lineageholder of Tibetan Buddhism. As an ecumenical, he studied with Nyingma and Sarma schools.

== Birth and youth ==
Shechen Gyaltsab was born at Dzokyi Tsolung within the region of Lhatok and Derge.

Alak Zenkar Rinpoche states that Shechen Gyaltsab:

From his own uncle, Pema Wangchen—or Kyi Yang as he was widely known—he learned how to read and received teachings on the common sciences, including The Mirror of Poetics, the three systems of Sanskrit grammar (known as Kalapa, Chandrapa and Sarasvata), The Treasure Mine of Composition, the major texts of the ‘white’ and ‘black’ astrological traditions and so on.

Jamyang Khyentse Wangpo recognised him as a tulku, the reincarnation of Orgyen Rangjung Dorje and he was installed as the fourth regent (Tibetan: "Gyaltsab") of Shechen Tennyi Dargye Ling monastery.

== Later years ==
From Jamyang Khyentse Wangpo, he received empowerments and instructions on the practices of Vajrakilaya.

Shechen Gyaltsab focused upon the phases of kye rim (generation phase) and dzog rim (completion phase) in his sadhana for more than twenty years.

Shechen Gyaltsab traversed the advanced bhumi and realized the sadhana of clear light.

== See also ==
- Refuge tree
- Phurba
