= Shenlha Okar =

Tibetan deity

Shiwa Okar on white horse, holding mirror & spear with a white flag; painting by thangka painter Greg Smith

Shenlha Ökar (Wylie: gshen lha 'od dkar) or Shiwa Ökar (Wylie: zhi ba 'od dkar) is the most important deity in the Yungdrung Bon tradition of Tibet. He is counted among the "Four Transcendent Lords" (Wylie: bde bar gshegs pa) along with Satrig Ersang (Sherab Chamma), Sangpo Bumtri, and Tonpa Shenrab Miwoche.

== Name and biography ==
Shenlha Ökar means "wisdom gshen of white light;" the variant Shiwa Okar means "peaceful white light." The Bon term gShen can mean "priest or shaman" or possibly in this case "deity who is a priest." In some accounts he is considered the sambhogakāya form of Tonpa Shenrab Miwoche, the founder of Bon (the nirmāṇakāya aspect). In other accounts, he is visited by Shenrab Miwoche when Miwoche is in a prior incarnation known as Salwa. Additionally, some categorize him as "corresponding exactly to the Buddhist category of dharmakāya."

Shenlha Okar is said to have created the world with the help of nine brother gods or nine cosmic gods (Wylie: srid pa'i lha) who appear as war gods or drala (Wylie: dgra bla). He is also considered a god of compassion with many parallels to Chenrezig and also with Amitābha.

== Depiction ==
Shenlha Okar is depicted with a white body "like the essence of crystal," holding a hook in his right hand (and sometimes a lasso in his left), and seated in a throne supported by elephants.

== Shiwa Okar in the terma of Chögyam Trungpa Rinpoche ==
Shiwa Okar featured in a work composed by the influential Tibetan Buddhist lama Chögyam Trungpa, particularly a long verse epic composed in Tibet called The Golden Dot: The Epic of the Lha, the Annals of the Kingdom of Shambhala, and in terma he revealed beginning in 1976. The Golden Dot was lost in Trungpa Rinpoche's flight from Tibet in 1959.

Trungpa Rinpoche began to reconstruct the original text after escaping Tibet, and it is this later work to which we refer. The first chapter describes the creation of the world by nine cosmic gods (shrid[sic] pa 'i lha) who appear in the form of native Tibetan deities known as drala (dgra bla), or war gods. These gods represent primal or originary aspects of the phenomenal world. For example, one of these lha stood for all kinds of light. Glancing in many directions, this deity created all of the lights existing in the world, including the sun, the moon, the light of the planets and stars, and the inward luminosity of consciousness itself. Another represented space and the sense of direction ... In Trungpa Rinpoche's epic these were directed by a ninth lha called Shiwa Okar ... a sort of absolute principle behind creation and the nature of reality. After these nine cosmic deities have created the world, [Shiwa Okar] goes to the things they have created and invests each one with an animistic spirit, a drala.

Kornman notes that one of the "striking things" about the text is that it refers not to Indic sources but to the "creation myths found in the royal chronicles and in the Epic of Gesar of Ling" and "evoke the cosmology of native Tibetan religion, not Buddhism." His Shambhala terma feature Shiwa Okar as an iṣṭhadevatā (Wylie: yi dam) "meditational deity", with a tantric retinue of drala and werma (Wylie: wer ma)

Trungpa Rinpoche's work has antecedents in the edition of the Gesar epic prepared by Jamgon Ju Mipham Gyatso and ritual practices he composed in conjunction with that work. Kornman notes "Mipham made his edition of the Gesar Epic a hybrid of Buddhist and local ideas. He made sure it would be read in this manner by writing a parallel set of Gesar chants that mix religions in the same way. These ritual practices may be found in the Na chapter of his collected works. In Bon tradition, King Gesar of Ling is sent to Tibet by Shenlha Okar, and Trungpa Rinpoche's blending of native traditions and Indian Buddhism appears to echo Mipham's.

In a "History of Shambhala" composed by Chogyam Trungpa, Shiwa Okar is described as follows:

[T]he very best lha of warriors, Peaceful White Light. ... He wore great silver armor, Shielding from a Thousand Thunderbolts, fastened together with lacing of divine white silk. On his head he wore a white helmet, Divine Fierce White Forehead, adorned with many inlaid jewels and with flourishes. On the top of that was an inconceivable white pennant with gold designs. It fluttered showing the radiance of the warrior drala and the shining light dots of the werma. It moved with the wind in the space of the sky. On his feet he wore Shangshug boots, Array of Nine Braveries, embroidered with beautiful rainbow designs, drawn designs of impressive armor, and bound by hard, solid meteoric iron nails. His face was like a full moon and his two eyes twinkled like inlaid great stars. His eyebrows were beautiful like the outstretched wings of a grey vulture. The shape of his nose was beautiful and well-defined, expressing the white lineage of the father lha. His lips were in the style of a lotus and, like the outstretched wings of a wild raven, he had a beautiful black moustache. His glorious warrior-sote was impressive like the quality of phapong longbu. His smiling face was enjoyable to see; his bright radiant face transformed one's perception. His torso had a great pose, projecting masculinity. His shoulders were great and broad. The lower part of his body was steady and agile.

== See also ==
- Shambhala Buddhism
- Sipe Gyalmo
