= Lungtok Tenpai Nyima =

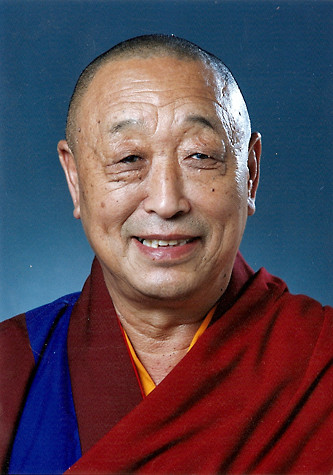
- 33rd Menri Trizin Rinpoche
- Born: Lama Tar; 1929; Amdo, Tibet
- Died: 14 September 2017 (aged 88); Dolanji, India
- Other names: Sherab Namdak, Sherab Tsultrim, Sangye Tenzin
- Religion: Bon
- Offices held: Abbot of Menri Monastery
- Title: 33rd Menri Trizin

Lungtok Tenpai Nyima (Tibetan: ལུང་རྟོགས་བསྟན་པའི་ཉི་མ, Wylie : lung rtogs bstan pa'i nyi ma) was the 33rd Menri Trizin, the abbot of the Menri Monastery and former leader of Bon.

At the age of 17 he took novice monk vows and got the name of Sherab Namdak (shes rab rnam dag) from Sherab Tenpai Gyeltsen (shes rab bstan pa'i rgyal mtshan). He achieved Geshe degree at age of 25 at Kyangtsang Monastery under the guidance of the chief teacher Horwa Drungrampa Tendzin Lodro Gyatso (hor ba drung rams pa bstan 'dzin blo gros rgya mtsho, 1889-1975)

Lungtok Tenpai Nyima's first visit to the West was thanks to the Rockefeller Foundation and David L. Snellgrove who brought him, Lopön Tenzin Namdak (slob dpon bstan 'dzin rnam dag) and Samten Gyaltsen Karmay to London in 1961.

In 1967 he was invited by Per Kværne to Norway in the interest of doing research together and to lecture on Tibetan history and religion at University of Oslo.

In 1968 at the new Tibetan Bonpo settlement in Dolanji, after a seven days long special ritual of selection process by the highest bonpo teachers and lamas, he was appointed on the golden throne of Nyamed Sherab Gyaltsen as the 33rd abbot of Menri monastery. He was enthroned on 4 March 1969 as supreme head of all the Bonpo followers and the chief of all the Bonpo Lamas both in exile and in Tibet, and received the name Lungtok Tenpai Nyima as his enthronement name.

Lungtok Tenpai Nyima was the first Tibetan monk to have an in-person meeting with Pope Paul VI and had a great relationship with Tenzin Gyatso, the 14th Dalai Lama.
