= Yeshe Walmo =

Deity of the Bon religion

Depiction of Yeshe Walmo.

Yeshe Walmo is a deity of the Bon religion and is regarded as the wisdom aspect of Sipe Gyalmo. She is venerated as the preserver and protector of all Bon wisdom and sacred texts.

== Theology and role ==
Yeshe Walmo plays a crucial role in safeguarding Bon teachings throughout history. During periods of persecution, lamas often hid Bon texts and ritual objects in remote mountains. Yeshe Walmo is considered the deity responsible for protecting these items and revealing them when the conditions are ripe. Such hidden objects are known as "terma", and the discoverers, usually dakinis or human tertöns, are called "tertons".

== Iconography ==
Yeshe Walmo is depicted in a form similar in color to Sipe Gyalmo but with one face and two arms. She stands on one foot, dressed in peacock feathers, symbolizing the transmutation of poison (ignorance). Her right hand holds a flaming thunderbolt sword to cut through ignorance, while her left hand holds a vase containing the waters of long life. She wears a tiger skin, symbolizing mastery over fierce energies, and stands upon a lotus flower representing the purity of wisdom, surrounded by flames that consume ignorance.

== Cultural and ritual significance ==
Practitioners invoke Yeshe Walmo for swift assistance in various aspects of life, including health, education, business, and spiritual development. She is considered particularly helpful to students and scholars seeking knowledge and insight.

== See also ==
- Sipe Gyalmo
- Sherab Chamma
- Terma (religion)
- Terton
- Bönpo deities
