= Lopön Tenzin Namdak =

Tibetan religious teacher and leader (1925–2025)

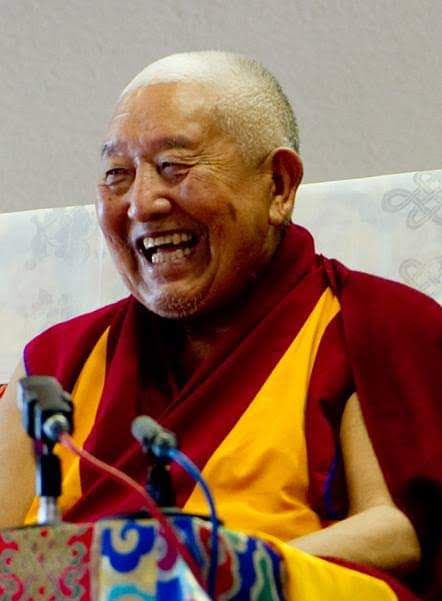
Lopon Tenzin Namdak Rimpoche

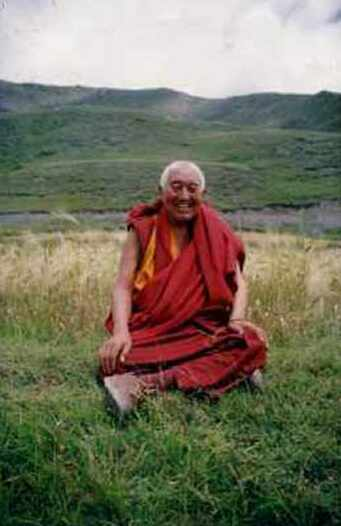
Lopön Tenzin Namdak, abbot of a Bon monastery in Nepal

Lopön Tenzin Namdak (Tibetan: སློབ་དཔོན་བསྟན་འཛིན་རྣམ་དག, Wylie: slob dpon bstan 'dzin rnam dag; 27 January 1925 – 12 June 2025) was a Tibetan religious leader and the most senior authority and teacher of Bon, in particular of Dzogchen and the Mother Tantras.

== Background ==
Tenzin Namdak's father was a farmer in Chamdo and his uncle, Kelzang Tsültrim (Wylie: bskal bzang tshul khrims), was the "chant leader" (Wylie: oM mdzad) among the monks at Tengchen Monastery (Wylie: steng chen). The monastery belonged to the tradition of Yungdrung Bön (Wylie: g.yung drung bon) rather than the New Bön tradition associated with Shardza Tashi Gyaltsen, and had close affiliations with Menri Monastery and Yungdrung Monastery (Wylie: g,yung drung gling) in Ü-Tsang.

In 1933, at age seven, Tenzin Namdak went to Tengchen and in 1941 he went to Yungdrung Monastery, where he helped execute a series of wall paintings for a new temple. In 1944, he went on pilgrimage to Nepal including Solu-Khombu, Pokhara, Mustang and Kathmandu.

Also in 1933, he returned to Yungdrung Monastery to commence studies in philosophy (Wylie: mtshan nyid). During 1945–50, he lived a principally eremitic existence, cloistered with his tutor and guru Gangru Tsültrim Gyeltsen (Wylie: sgang ru tshul khrims rgyal mtshan), with whom he studied poetry (Wylie: snyan ngag), cosmology (Wylie: mdzod phug), grammar (Wylie: sgra), monastic discipline (Wylie: dul ba) and the principal stages on the path to enlightenment (Wylie: sa lam).

In 1950, Tenzin Namdak went to Menri Monasteryin Tsang. On the instruction of his teacher, he commenced his studies. In 1953, he was elected to the position of lopön (head teacher) and received the degree of geshe.

Tenzin Namdak died on 12 June 2025.

== Career ==
=== Professorship and retreat ===
Tenzin Namdak left Menri in 1959 due to increasing conflicts between the indigenous Tibetan people and the encroaching Han Chinese since the Battle of Chamdo in 1950. He went to Serzhig Monastery on Lake Dangra – a sacred lake for the Bonpo – in northern Tsang, where he remained in spiritual retreat until 1960.

=== Capture and escape ===
After the 1959 Tibetan uprising, many lamas, including the 14th Dalai Lama and Rangjung Rigpe Dorje, 16th Karmapa, along with numerous Tibetan refugees departed their homeland to seek refuge in India and Nepal. Riding this exodus, Tenzin Namdak tried to reach safety in India in 1960, but was shot and captured by Chinese Communist soldiers and imprisoned for ten months. He later escaped to Nepal via the small principality of Mustang.

=== Collaboration with Snellgrove/Hoffmann ===
While in Kathmandu in 1961, Tenzin Namdak was invited to London by his colleague, the English tibetologist David Snellgrove, through a Rockefeller Foundation grant, where he became a visiting scholar at SOAS, University of London. He resided for a period at the University of Cambridge. The collaboration with Snellgrove resulted in the publication of The Nine Ways of Bon, which includes extracts translated from the esteemed Ziji (Wylie: gzi brjid, The Magnificence), an extensive hagiography of the founder of Bon, Tonpa Shenrab Miwoche. This was the first scholarly study of the Yungdrung Bon tradition conducted in the West. He stayed in England for three years, until 1964.

In 1969, Tenzin Namdak made a second visit to Europe at the invitation of Professor Helmut Hoffmann, where he was a visiting scholar at LMU Munich, and with whom he collaborated on the Dictionary of Written Tibetan.

== Tibetan Bönpo Foundation ==
During those days a social worker named Dr. Keppler was working to help the Dorthang Bon community of Nepal. While returning to Nepal after visiting his home he was not allowed to visit Nepal, on the accusation of cow slaughter. However he wanted to continue his service towards the Bon community, since he knew that the Bon community in India was in a needful state and facing discrimination from other fellow Tibetans. The 32nd Menri Trizin, head of Menri Monastery, had just died and his successor had not yet been appointed. There was no spiritual head of the Bonpos at that time, making it more difficult to contact the community. So through some searching and some information he got from some CTA officials, he met Tenzin Namdak in Delhi (Hauz Khas). There he discussed with Tenzin Namdak about the difficulty faced by the Bon community. Hence, he made the blueprint of the Tibetan Bonpo foundation and Tenzin Namdak was suggested as the acting director. At that time, Dr. Keppler donated Rs 20000 INR for building a Bon monastery in future. Soon after Dr. Kepplar arranged funds from the Catholic Relief Services with the help of a friend of his who was working in the USA embassy in India, for the Bonpos to purchase a land where they could rebuild their community. Dolanji was selected.

After difficulties in acquiring the land, Gungthang Tsultrim helped register the land for the organisation "Bod kyi Bonpo Tsokpa" by including Dolanji in the organisation called Tsokpa Chuksum, in which other settlements were registered, such as the Bir settlement in Himachal and Clement Town in Dehradhun etc. Dolanji, near Solan in Himachal Pradesh.

In 1967, the settlement was formally established and registered with the Indian Government under the name of the Tibetan Bönpo Foundation. About seventy families transferred there from Manali and each received a house and a small piece of land, the size depending on size of the family. The Tibetan Bönpo Foundation possessed its own constitution and administration. The Abbot of Menri acted as president. The new settlement at Dolanji was named Topgyel Sarpa (Wylie: thob rgyal gsar pa) after the village of Topgyel. Most of the inhabitants in the new settlement came from the Mount Kailash region and Upper Tsang in the west, and from Hor, Kongpo, Derge and Amdo (Ngawa Tibetan and Qiang Autonomous Prefecture) in the east.

After the death of the abbot of Menri in 1963, Sherap Lodro, abbot of Yungdrung Ling, became the spiritual head of the Bön community in exile. Sherap Lodro came to Dolanji with a band of monks who founded a new monastic community. An intimate prayer chapel and a few small houses were built. In 1969, the successor to the abbot of Menri was established by lot and the office fell to Lungtok Tenpé Nyima (Wylie: lung rtogs bstan pa'i nyi ma), who was installed as the 33rd Menri Trizin.

Following the death of Yungdrung Ling abbot, Sangye Tenzin assumed the spiritual leadership of the Bönpos. More houses were established, along with a library and abbot's residence. Monastic life was structured around the prātimokṣa of the Yungdrung Bon vinaya. The foundation for the principal temple was inaugurated in 1969 and completed in 1978 and named Pel Shenten Menri Ling (Wylie: dpal gshen bstan sman ri'i gling). The complex was styled the Bönpo Monastic Centre and formed part of the Tibetan Bönpo Foundation.

From 1970 to 1979, Tenzin Namdak continued writing and teaching while in residence at the Bönpo Monastic Centre. Concurrently, he was engaged in the publishing of significant Bönpo texts. From 1967, when the first monks came to Dolanji, teaching had been done by Lopön Sangye Tenzin, the former head teaching master at Menri, and assisted by Tenzin Namdak, who became his successor.

== Lama college and Bönpo monastery ==
When Sangye Tenzin died in 1978, Tenzin Namdak was assigned responsibility for the education of the younger generation of monks. By 1978, a sufficient number of Bönpo texts had been published so that a curriculum could be organized around them. Thus a lama's college (shedrup; bshad sgrub) was established in 1978, organized under the guidance of Lopön Rinpoche who served as one of the two professors. The official name of the college is Yungdrung Bön Shedrup Lobnyer Dude (gyung drung bon bshad sgrub slob gnyer 'dud sde).

The purpose of the college at Dolanji was to preserve the tradition of philosophy established and developed at Yeru Wensaka (gyas ru dben sa kha), where philosophical analysis and logic were applied to the understanding of Do Ngag Semsum (mdo sngags sems gsum), that is, to the teachings of the Sutras, the Tantras and Dzogchen. Unlike the Nyingmapa tradition, the Bönpos developed a system of logic and debate specifically relating to the Dzogchen teaching. At Menri in Tibet, all instruction in Tantra and Dzogchen was done in private except for the philosophy college where the monks studied the five scripture system Dozhung Nga (mdo gzhung lnga).

- Tsema (tshad ma) – Pramana or logic
- Parchin (phar phyin) – Prajnaparamita or the Perfection of Wisdom Sutras
- Uma (dbu ma) – Madhyamaka philosophy
- Dzopu (mdzod phug) – Abhidharma or cosmology
- Dulwa (dul ba) – Vinaya or monastic discipline

However, in Dolanji students also study Tantra and Dzogchen in the college, as well as the five scriptural systems that pertain to Sutra. Also included in the curriculum are the secular sciences (rignai; rig gnas), such as grammar, poetics, astrology, and so on. The college has a nine-year term of studies that prepares the student for a degree in Geshe. The first group of young monks graduated in 1986.

Another Bönpo monastery and college known as Triten Norbutse (khri brtan nor bu rtse), located near Swayambhu, west of Kathmandu, Nepal was established under Tenzin Namdak's direction. In 2005, he founded in France the new bonpo Shenten Dargye Ling. In 2010, he consecrated the stupa in Shenten Dargye Ling with Lungtok Tenpai Nyima, 33rd Abbot of Menri and consecrated in same year the Great Stupa in Chamma Ling, Valle de Bravo, Mexico with Nyima and many bonpo teachers and Geshes.

== Third trip to The West ==
In 1989, Tenzin Namdak traveled to England, America and Italy, at the invitation of the International Dzogchen Community of Chögyal Namkai Norbu Rinpoche in those countries. During his six-month trip, he presented to interested Western students the Dzogchen teaching according to the Bönpo traditions of the Atri (a khrid) and the Zhang Zhung Nyengyu (shang zhung snyan rgyud).

In 1991, he visited Germany, England, the Netherlands and Italy. During his visit to these countries, he spoke and taught on various meditation systems and fields of study of the Bön tradition. Later that year, he was invited by the Dalai Lama to represent the Bön tradition at the Kalachakra Initiation in New York. In this way, Tenzin Namdak spread Bönpo teachings in many countries. His permanent residences were in Kathmandu, France (Blou) and Dolanji.

== Bibliography ==
The Collected Works of Menri Yongdzin Lopon Tenzin Namdak Rinpoche: Vol. 1-13 (Tibetan language)

- Volume 1: History of the successive lives of Buddha Tonpa Shenrab based upon the extensive and medium length biographies
- Volume 2: continuation of Volume 1
- Volume 3: Early Tibetan religion and culture, history of Yundgrung Bön and Bon practice, important Bon monasteries and holy sites in Tibet and Nepal.
- Volume 4: Cataloges of temples and stupas, description of Tonpa Shenrab's clothing, study of his date of birth, list of lineage masters.
- Volume 5: Vehicles of Bön 1, 2 and method of building statues, stupas, temples, the mandalas of the four series of Tantras, methods of divination.
- Volume 6: Arrangement for thangka paintings of the yidam deities of the four tantric cycles along with drawings showing their position and colors.
- Volume 7: continuation of Volume 6
- Volume 8: The first and second texts of this series explain logic. Prajna Paramita, Shinay practice, advanced Shinay.
- Volume 9: Series of texts on Madhyamaka
- Volume 10: Extensive study of the stages of practice of the four cycles of Tantra
- Volume 11: Five texts explaining the Mother Tantra
- Volume 12: Description and explanation of rituals
- Volume 13: Six texts with instructions on rDzogs chen. The fifth text contains long life prayers.

In English:

- 197? Dictionary of Written Tibetan collaboration with Helmut Hoffmann, work in progress: Wörterbuch der tibetischen Schriftsprache. Im Auftrag der Kommission für zentral- und ostasiatische Studien der Bayerischen Akademie der Wissenschaften in Kommission beim Verlag C.H. Beck, München. 9 issues 2005–2010, to be continued.
- 1980 Nine Ways of Bon: Excerpts from gZi-brjid, collaboration with David Snellgrove ISBN 9780877737391
- 1991 Tapihritsa: The Condensed Meaning of an Explanation of the Teachings of Yungdrung Bon, Bonpo Foundation
- 2002 Mandalas of the Bon Religion, Saujanya Publications, ISBN 8186561005
- 2002 Heart Drops of Dharmakaya: Dzogchen Practice of the Bön Tradition, Snow Lion Publications, ISBN 1559391723
- 2006 Bonpo Dzogchen Teachings, Vajra Publications, ISBN 9994672053
- 2006 The Main Dzogchen Practices: From the Oral Transmission of the Great Perfection in Zhang Zhung, ISBN 9994672053
- 2010 Masters of the Zhang Zhung Nyengyud, Heritage Publishers, ISBN 8170262682
- 2012 Heart Essence of the Khandro – Experiential Instructions on Bonpo Dzogchen, Heritage Publishers, ISBN 8170262828
