= Menri Monastery =

1405 Tibetan monastery, refounded in India

Menri
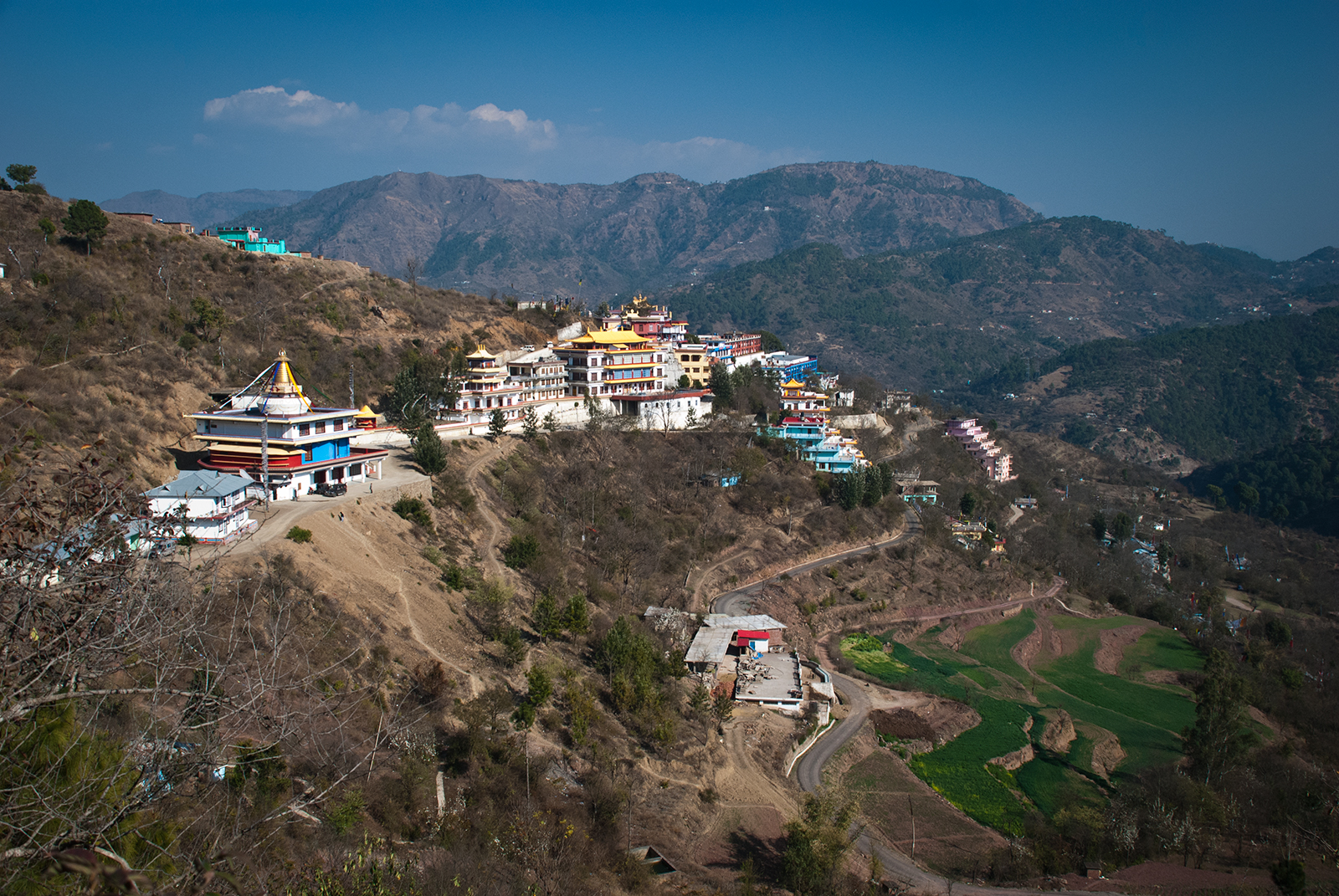

- Location within people's Republic of China Menri Monastery (China)

Religion
- Affiliation: Tibetan Buddhism
- Rite: Bon
- Year consecrated: 1405

Location
- Location: Namling County, Tibet Autonomous Region
- Interactive map of Menri
- Coordinates: 29.509°N 89.535°E

Architecture
- Founder: Nyamme Shérap Gyeltsen (Wylie: mnyam med shes rab rgyal mtshan, 1356–1416)
- Established: 1405; 621 years ago

Menri Monastery

Tibetan name
- Tibetan: སྨན་རི་
Transcriptions
- Wylie: sman ri

Menri Monastery (Tibetan: སྨན་རི་, Wylie: sman ri — "medicine mountain") is the name of a Bon monastery in Tibet that has been refounded in India. The name derives from the medicinal plants and medicinal springs on the mountain. Menri became the leading Bon monastery in the Tibetan cultural region. The abbot of Menri is recognized as the spiritual leader of Bon.

== History ==
Menri Monastery was established in 1405 by Nyammé Shérap Gyeltsen (Wylie: mnyam med shes rab rgyal mtshan, 1356–1416) from Gyarong (Gyelrong), on the slope of Mount Shari Phowa (Wylie: shar ri pho ba) in Topgyel (Wylie: thob rgyal), Tsang.

Nyammé Shérap Gyeltsen had been the eighteenth abbot of an old monastery also called Menri. The first monastery at Menri was founded in 1072 as Yéru Wensakha Monastery (Wylie: g.yas ru dben sa kha dgon pa). It was destroyed by a flood in 1386.

The new Menri Monastery, established in 1405, was founded in the Bru lineage of Bon and the Yéru Wensakha tradition. "Many of the monks who succeeded [Nyammé Shérap Gyeltsen] were also from Gyarong." The monastery practiced Yungdrung Bon, and was known "for its strict practice of monastic rules, which set a standard for other Bon monasteries." Rinchen Gyeltsen was the second abbot.

The monastery had 32 abbots between its founding and 1966. The administration of the monastery is the subject of an article by Per Kvaerne.

Sanggye Tendzin (1912-1978) served as lopön at Menri, and "was also in charge of printing important works of Dzogchen."

Menri Monastery had four colleges: Lingmey (gLing-smad), Lingto (gLing-stod), Lingkey (gLing-ske) and Lingzur (gLing-zur). The colleges had twelve divisions and all together, in 1959, between 400 and 500 monks. Menri had 250 branch monasteries, in all areas of Tibet except U, as well as in India, China, Bhutan, Sikkim, Nepal, and Mongolia.

In 1947, Menri itself established a debating college. Although Ensaka had the debate tradition study of sutra, tantra, and dzogchen, Menri was only able to institute it for sutra. The monastery carried out a full calendar of tantric rituals and practice.

The administration of the monastery is the subject of an article by Per Kvaerne.

== Menri Monastery in India ==
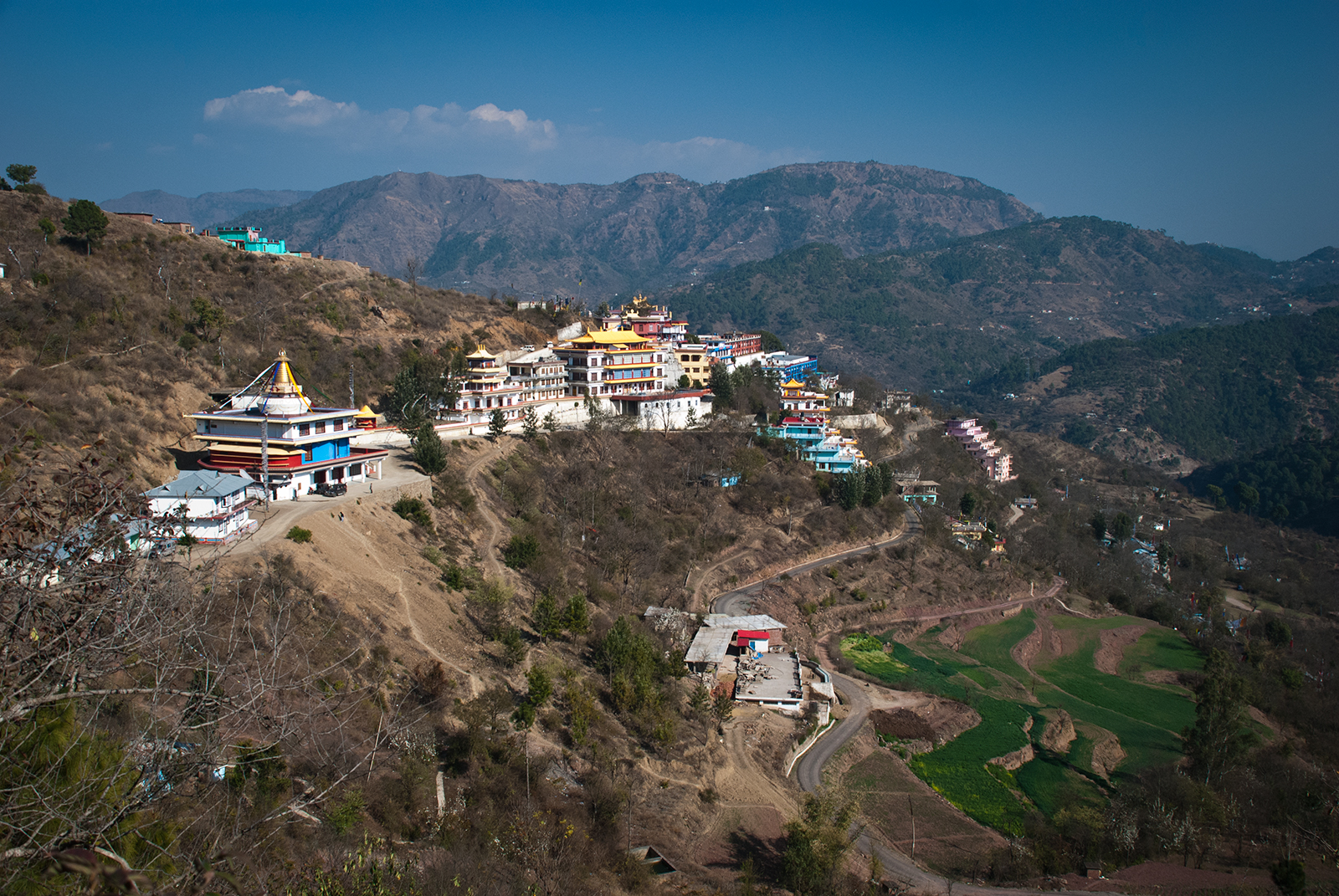
Menri Monastery, India

In 1967, Menri was refounded at Dolanji in Himachal Pradesh, India by Lungtok Tenpai Nyima and Lopön Tenzin Namdak. This monastery has recreated the geshe training program, and is home to over two hundred monks. Menri in India and Triten Norbutse Monastery in Nepal now host the only two geshe programs in the Bon lineage.

== See also ==
- Lopön Tenzin Namdak
- Lungtok Tenpai Nyima
