= Shurishing Yungdrung Dungdrakling Monastery =

Religion
- Affiliation: Tibetan Buddhism

Location
- Location: Sikkim, India
- Country: India

Shurishing Yungdrung Dungdrakling Monastery is a Buddhist monastery in Sikkim, northeastern India.

== See also ==
- Bon
