= Dawa Gyaltsen =

Dawa Gyaltsen (Tibetan: ཟླ་བ་རྒྱལ་མཚན, Wylie: zla ba rgyal mtshan) was a Dzogchen master who lived in the 8th century in the area of Zhangzhung. His body of work includes the Fivefold Teaching:

1. Vision is mind.
2. Mind is empty.
3. Emptiness is clear light.
4. Clear light is union.
5. Union is great bliss.

The Five-fold teaching is intended to provide a path to awakening. Practitioner meditation, in conjunction with pointing-out instruction of a qualified master, is intended to introduce the primordial and true nature of mind. Dawa Gyaltsen's teaching were passed on through several notable students, including Tapihritsa, and continue to be taught to this day by Tenzin Wangyal Rinpoche and other heirs of the lineage.
