= Tapihritsa =

Bon Practitioner

Tapihritsa or Tapahritsa (c 7th ~ 8th century) was a Bon practitioner who achieved the Dzogchen mastery of the rainbow body and consequently, as a fully realised trikaya Buddha, is invoked as an iṣṭadevatā (Classical Tibetan: yi dam) by Dzogchen practitioners in both Bon and Tibetan Buddhism. He is known for his achievement of the rainbow body.

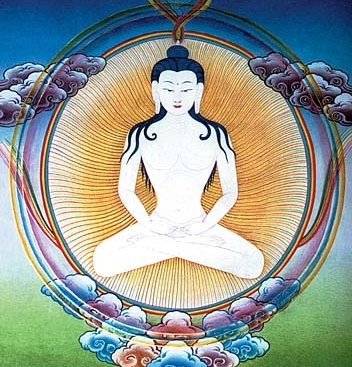
Tapihritsa, a Bon siddha from Zhangzhung

The historical Tapihritsa was born in Zhangzhung to a family of nomad. Tapihritsa's principal teacher was Dawa Gyaltsen.

Tapihritsa was contemporaneous with Ligmincha, King of Zhangzhung, and Trisong Detsen, Emperor of Tibet.

== Iconography ==
Tapihritsa is typically depicted as a naked and unadorned white figure, with his pure body transparent as a crystal, symbolizing the pure and primordial state of awareness and often visualized as representing the realization of all the masters of the Zhangzhung Whispered Transmission (Wylie: zhang zhung snyan brgyud) lineage, one of the three Bon Dzogchen lineages.

== Works ==
Tapihritsa's primary notable work is The Twenty-One Nails (rdzogs pa chen po zhang zhung snyan rgyud las gzer bu gnyis shu rtsa gcig). There are two translations of this text and commentary into English, as follows:

- Reynolds, John Mrydhin (2014). The Precepts of the Dharmakaya: Advanced Instructions on the Practice of Bönpo Dzogchen According to the Zhang-Zhung Tradition of Tibet. Vajra Books. ISBN 978-9937-623-15-5. A translation of Tapihritsa's The Twenty-One Nails.
- Tapihritsa (2019). The Twenty-One Nails: According to the Zhang Zhung Oral Transmission Lineage of Bon Great Completion. Translated by Brown, Daniel P.; Gurung, Sonam. United States: Integral Publishing House. ISBN 978-1-7321579-7-2.
