= Tonpa Shenrab Miwoche =

Founder of the Bon tradition

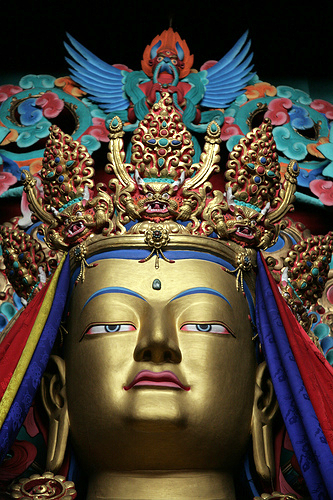
Tonpa Shenrab

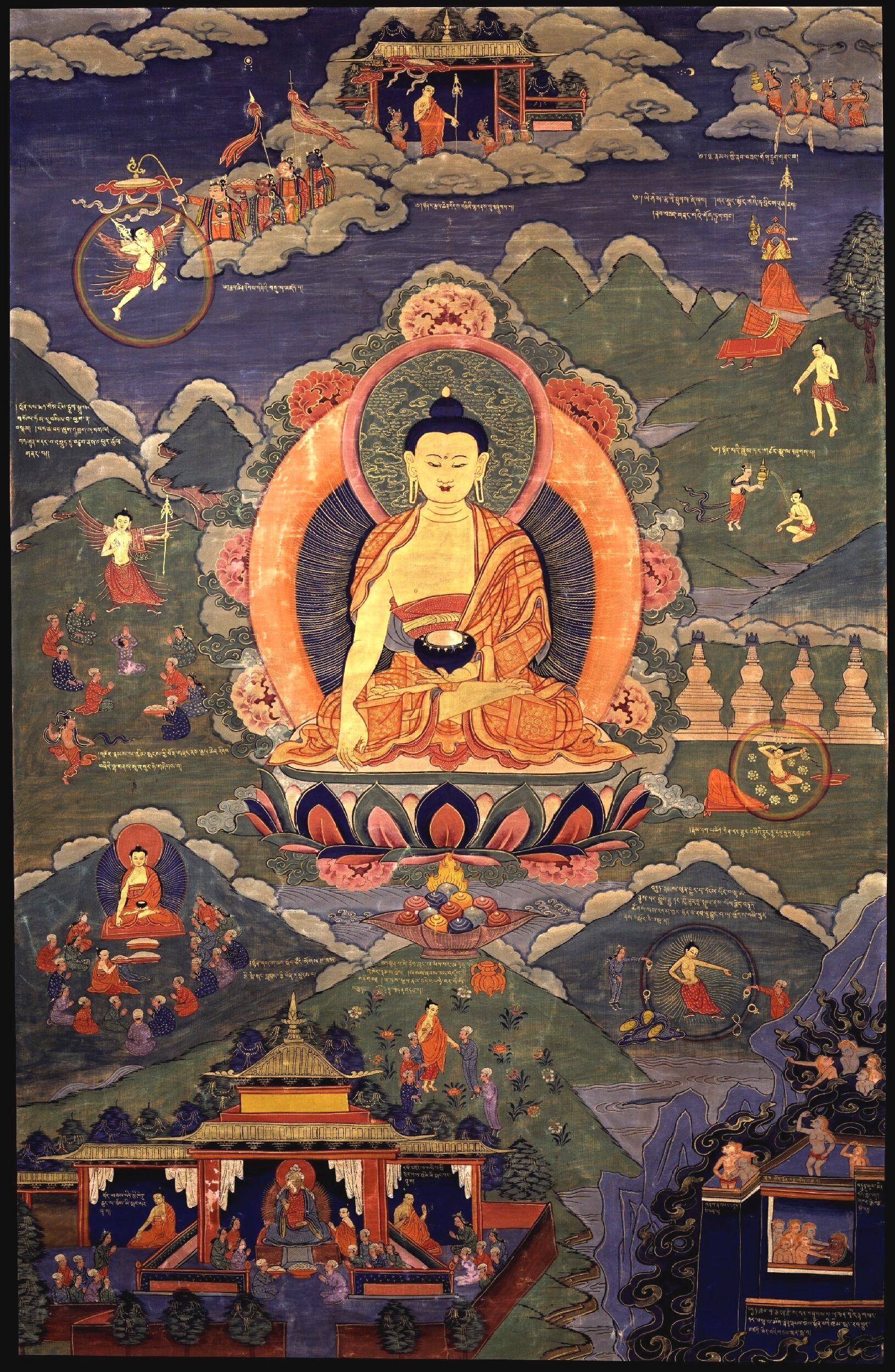
Tonpa Shenrab life story, 19th-century painting, Rubin Museum of Art

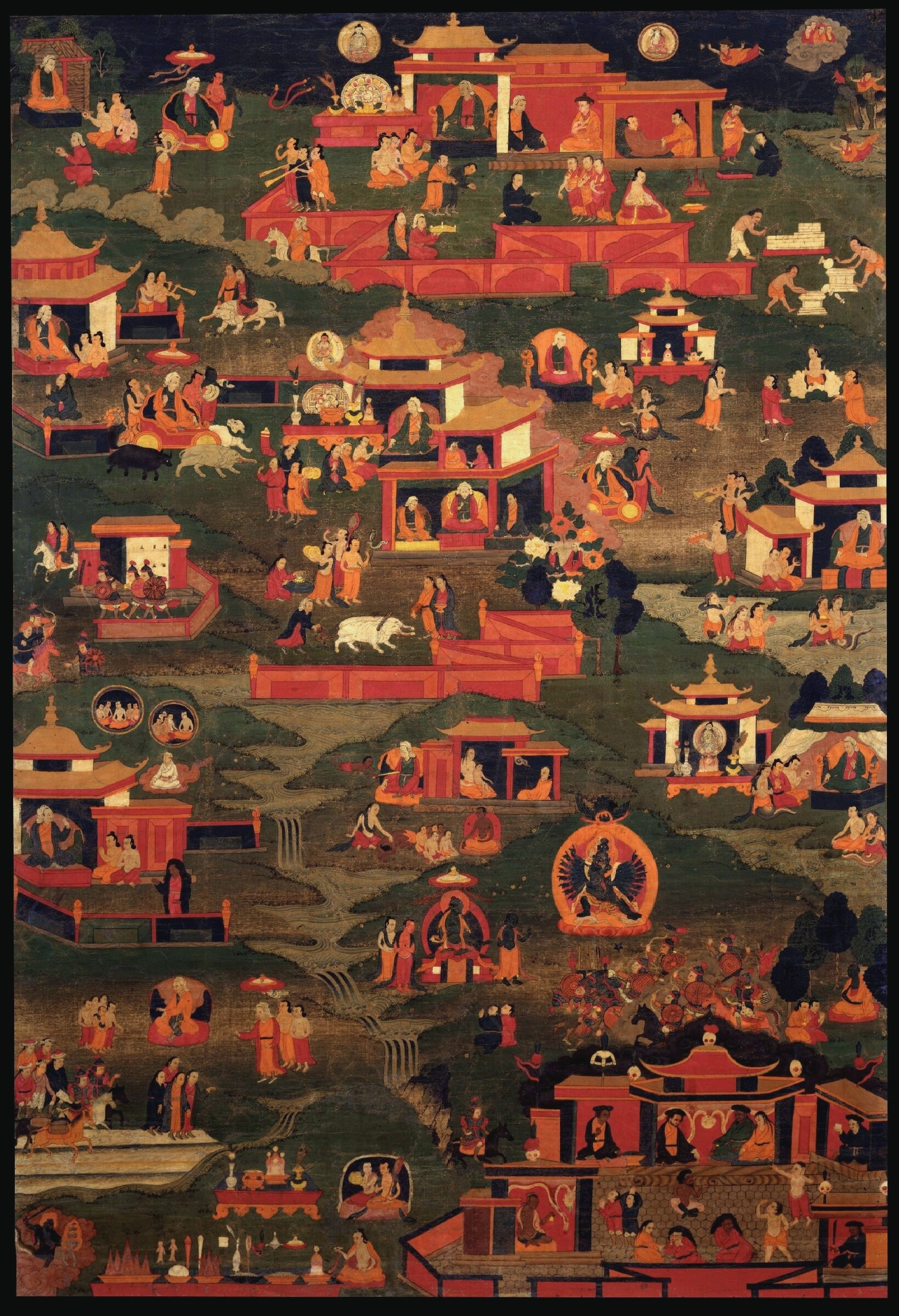
Tonpa Shenrab life story, 19th-century painting, Rubin Museum of Art

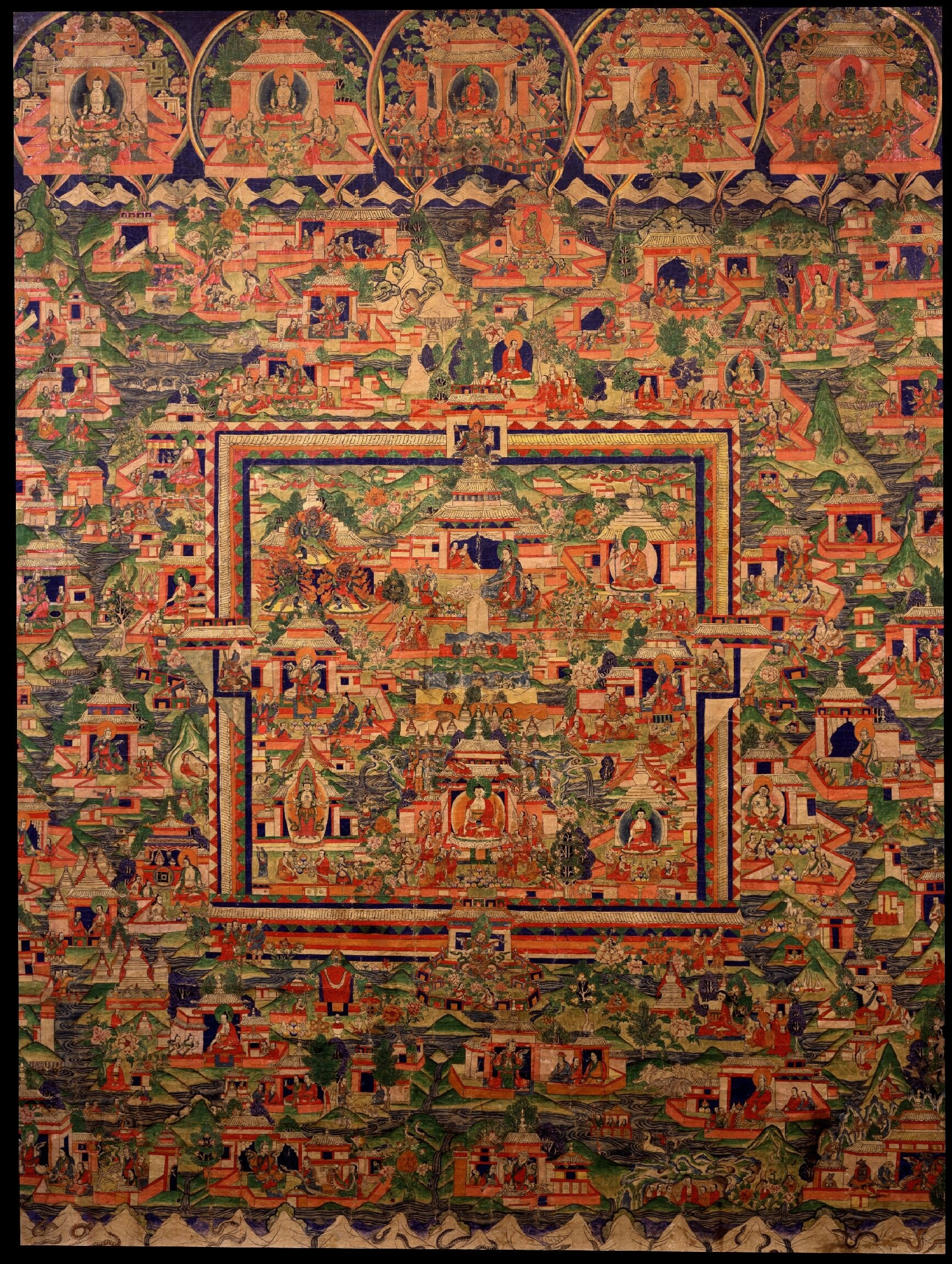
Olmo Lung Ring, homeland of Tonpa Shenrab Miwo, 19th-century painting, Rubin Museum of Art

Tonpa Shenrab (Tibetan: སྟོན་པ་གཤེན་རབ་མི་བོ་།, Wylie: ston pa gshen rab mi bo, lit. 'Teacher Shenrab'), also known as Shenrab Miwo (Wylie: gshen rab mi bo), Shenrab Miwoche, Buddha Shenrab, Guru Shenrab, and by a number of other titles, is the legendary founder and reformer of the Bon religious tradition of Tibet. Bönpos usually add the honorific "Tonpa" ("founder" or "teacher") before his name.

The story of Tonpa Shenrab was revealed in a fourteenth-century terma of Loden Nyingpo.

== Existence ==
"[Shenrab Miwo] occupies a position very similar to that of Śākyamuni in Buddhism, but ... we have no available [or pre-10th century] sources with which to establish his historicity, his dates, his racial origin, his activities, and the authenticity of the enormous number of books either attributed directly to him or believed to be his word."

== Etymology ==
The name Shenrab Miwo is in the Zhang-Zhung language, which is a relative of Old Tibetan. It appears to be the Zhangzhung word for "bodhisattva" (equivalent to Tibetan shégya sempa, Wylie: shes rgya sems dpa').

"Tonpa" means "Founder/Teacher"; "Shenrab" is interpreted by Bönpos as "Buddha." The term "Yungdrung" also has Buddhist connotations: "Yungdrung" means Vajra, and "Yungdrung Tsulpa" means Bodhisattva.

== Biography ==
Accounts of Tonpa Shenrab's life are found in three principal sources, the Dodü (Wylie: mdo 'dus), Zermik (Wylie: gzer mig), and Ziji (Wylie: gzi brjid). The first two are considered terma revealed in the 10th or 11th century; the third is part of the oral lineage (Wylie: snyan brgyud).

=== Chronology according to traditions ===
Bön tradition asserts that Tonpa Shenrab lived in a remote antiquity, long before Śākyamuni. According to standard Bön chronology, he was born in 16,017 BCE in the land of Olmolungring and lived for 82 years, first marrying and teaching sciences such as logic, phonology, astronomy, and medicine, then renouncing royal life at age 31, attaining realization at Mount Kailash, and spreading Bön until his passing., while in 1804, Tsultrim Gyaltsen placed his date of birth as having occurred 22,799 years before his own time, 1804, [i.e. 20,995 BCE], he further recorded that Shenrab died around 12,795 BCE

Alternative narratives, sometimes framed in more "historical" terms, place Shenrab in the early 1st millennium BCE. A few accounts describe him as the first king who unified Tibet and founded the Zhangzhung kingdom in the 6th century BCE; others identify him as a Zhangzhung prince active in the 4th century BCE. Still other traditions claim his birth as early as 1917 BCE

=== Life and deeds ===
Like Gautama, Tonpa Shenrab was of royal birth. At thirty-one, he renounced his inheritance to pursue enlightenment, embraced renunciation and austerities, and spread the doctrine of Bön. He eventually arrived in Zhangzhung, near Mount Kailash.

From childhood, he displayed great abilities—teaching sciences, emanating multiple forms to aid beings, and traveling widely. At 16 he married, at 18 fought demons, at 20 taught in China and India, and by 26 began preaching. At 31 he became a monk, attained realization, and lived until age 82.

Bönpos believe Shakyamuni's previous life was "Prince White Banner" and that Shenrab was his teacher. They credit him with creating Zhangzhung culture, including crafts, linguistics, medicine, astronomy, and inner Bön doctrine, and even claim he was the source of world culture and Buddhism itself.

Tibetan Buddhists criticize such narratives as imitations of the Buddha's life, calling Bön an "outer path" (Wylie: phyi lam pa). Today, Bön is administratively placed under the Buddhist Association of China.

== Forms of Tonpa Shenrab ==
Tonpa Shenrab Miwoche is believed to have many forms:

- Drenpa Namkha (All three)
- Tagla Mebar
- Mehnla

== Buddhist views on Shenrab ==
Many Buddhists in Bhutan practice Bon alongside Buddhism, but keeping Buddhism as the main tradition. Many of these 'Bon Buddhists' see Shenrab as a previous Buddha like Kassapa Buddha.

== Sources ==
- Bellezza, John Vincent. (2010). "gShen-rab Myi-bo, His life and times according to Tibet’s earliest literary sources." Revue d’Etudes Tibétaines Number 19 October 2010, pp. 31–118.
- Unknown author (2005). The Bonpo's Tradition. (Accessed: January 17, 2007).
