= Drenpa Namkha =

Tibetan yogi and scholar

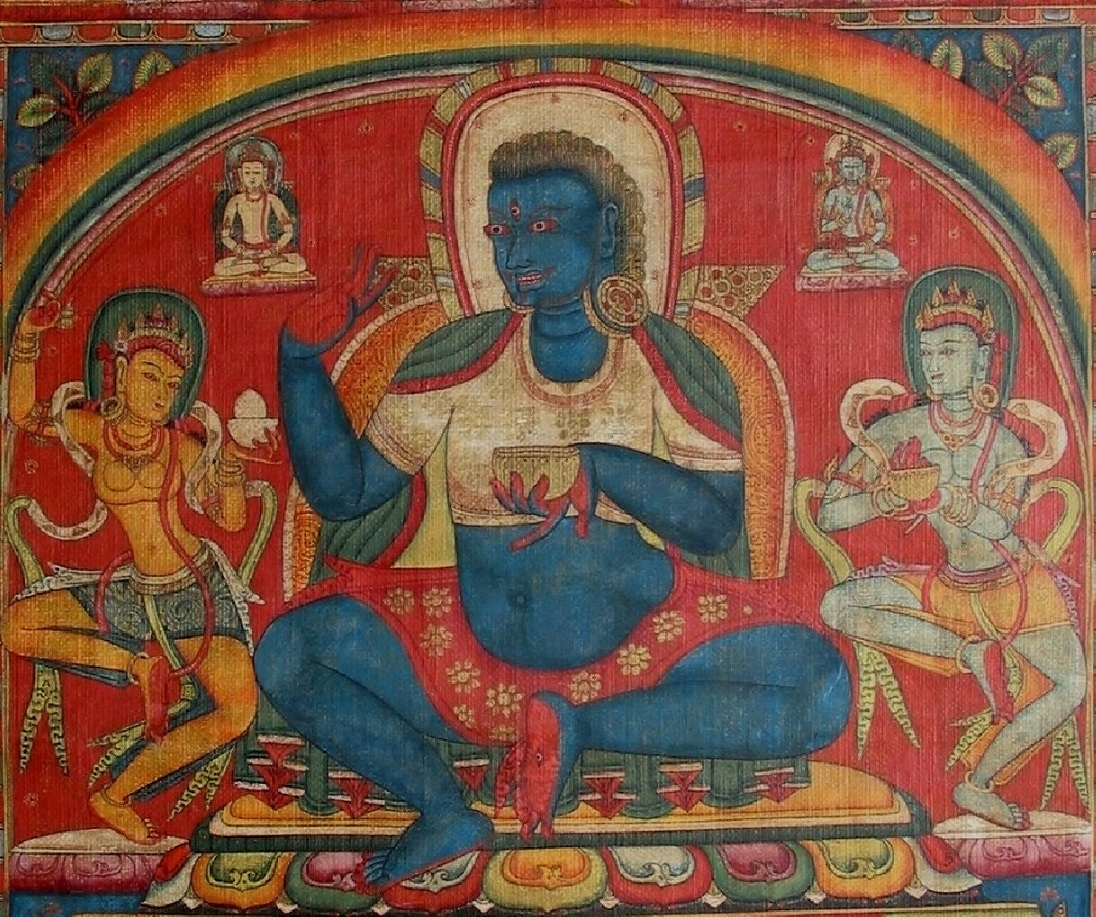
Lama Drenpa Namka, 14th century

Drenpa Namkha (Tibetan: དྲན་པ་ནམ་མཁའ་, Wylie: dran pa nam mkha) was a prominent figure in the 8th century Tibetan Bon tradition. Born in the region of Khyunglung Ngulkhar, near Mount Kailash in southwestern Tibet, he is revered as a great yogi and scholar, instrumental in preserving and transmitting the teachings of Bon during a period of intense persecution.

== Life and Legacy ==
Drenpa Namkha is credited with organizing and disseminating many of the Dzogchen Semde teachings, central to the Bon tradition. He is associated with the concealment of Bon texts and ritual objects, known as terma, during times of persecution. These hidden teachings were later rediscovered by tertons, individuals believed to have the ability to uncover such concealed wisdom.

According to Bon sources, Drenpa Namkha married a woman named Oden Barma, who was of high-caste Indian descent. They had twin sons: Tsewang Rigdzin, a renowned Bon teacher, and Pema Tongdrol, often identified with the Buddhist master Padmasambhava.

== Iconography ==
In Bon iconography, Drenpa Namkha is depicted holding a Yungdrung chakshing in his right hand, symbolizing the indestructibility and permanence of Bon teachings. An eye on the sole of his foot represents victory over heretics and the triumph of truth.

== Reincarnations and Influence ==
Drenpa Namkha is believed to have had several emanations throughout history:

- Khöpung Drenpa Namkha: A prince from Zhang Zhung who renounced his royal lineage to become a Bon master and transmitted teachings to future generations.
- Drenpa Zungi Namtrul: Another significant figure believed to be a reincarnation of Drenpa Namkha, continuing his legacy.

== Scholarly Contributions ==
Drenpa Namkha's biography, detailing his life and teachings, was compiled into an eight-volume work by sPa-tshang Sonam Gyantsan and published in Delhi in 1983.
