= Sipe Gyalmo =

Bon deity

Sipe Gyalmo (Tibetan: སི་ཕེ་རྒྱལ་མོ་, "Queen of the World") is a meditational and protector deity in the Bon religion. She is one of the manifestations of the Loving Mother of Wisdom (Sherab Chamma), embodying both wisdom and compassion.

== Theology and role ==
Sipe Gyalmo is regarded as a powerful protector of practitioners and lineages within Bön, invoked to remove obstacles and transform negative forces. She is closely associated with Sherab Chamma, also known as Thugje Chamma (Loving Mother of Compassion), considered the mother of all Buddhas and the embodiment of perfect wisdom, analogous to Tara in Buddhist traditions.

== Iconography ==
Sipe Gyalmo is traditionally depicted with three faces and six arms, each holding ritual implements or symbolic objects. She manifests in six principal colors: white, yellow, red, black, blue, and dark brown. Iconography often shows her riding either a black or red mule. The objects in her hands may include a victory banner, sword or dagger, mirror, hook, trident, wand, and a skullcup filled with blood, each symbolizing her power to conquer ignorance and protect the Dharma.

== Manifestations ==
Her six color manifestations correspond to different protective and wisdom functions: white for peaceful activity, yellow for abundance, red for subjugation of negative forces, black for wrathful protection, blue for annihilation of obstacles, and dark brown for secret or esoteric practices.

== Cultural and ritual significance ==
Sipe Gyalmo is central to numerous Bön liturgical practices and rituals, particularly in protector deity ceremonies and meditational practices. Her imagery appears in thangkas, statues, and ritual objects, emphasizing her integral role as both a wisdom deity and a fierce protector.

== See also ==
- Bon
- Yidam
- Protector deity
- Tara (Buddhism)
