= Dolanji =

Locality in Himachal Pradesh, India

Coordinates: 30°50′45″N 77°08′54″E

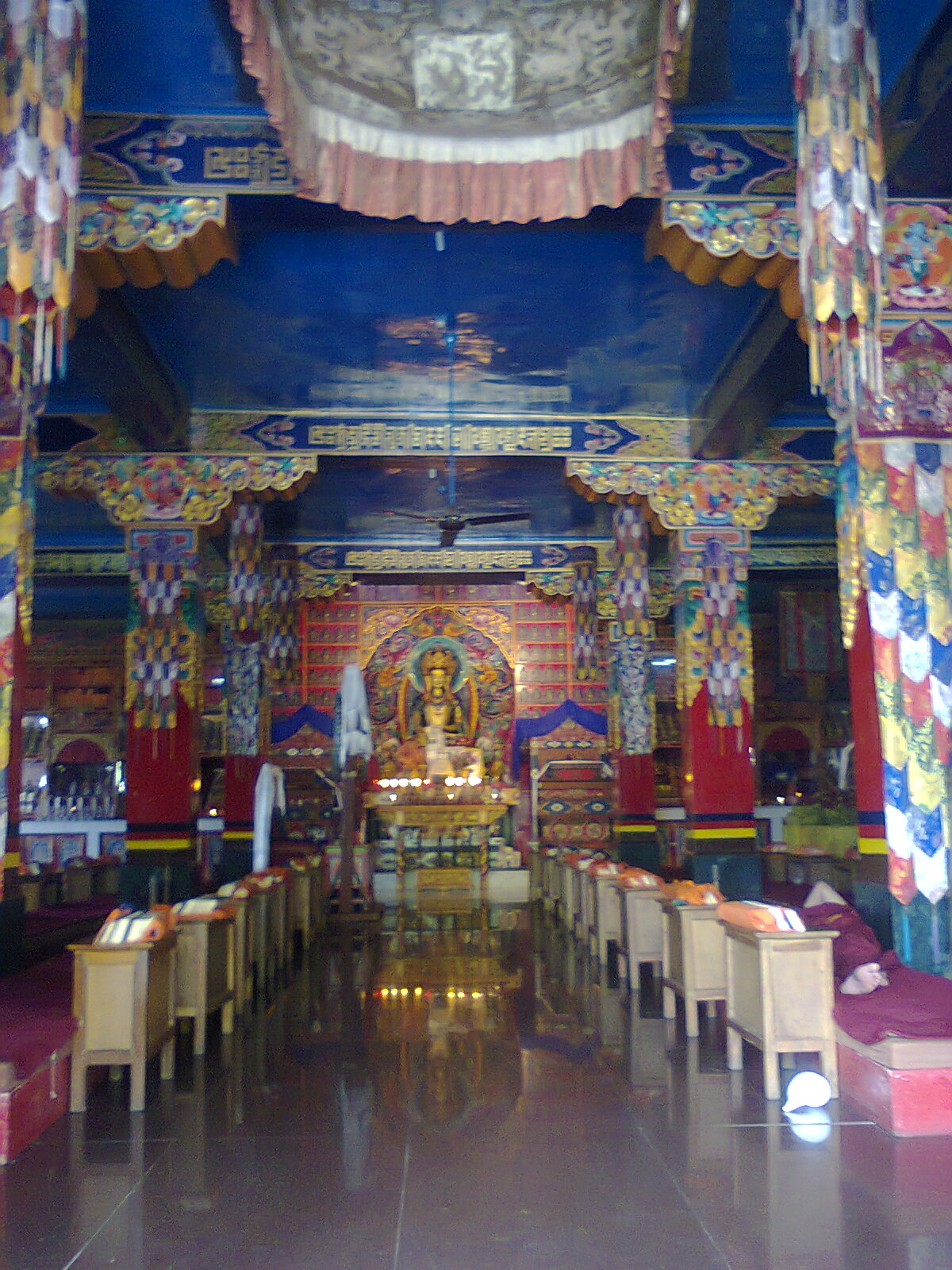
Bon monastery entrance, Dolanji

Dolanji is an area near Solan in Himachal Pradesh, India. It is famous for its Bon Monastery, which one of the main tourist attractions in the Sirmour district.

Dolanji is an offshoot of the Menri Monastery, the second oldest monastery in the world. It is located at a distance of 24–25 km from Kumarhatti, on the Narag-Sarahan road and is run by the Yungdrung Bon Monastic Centre. Constructed in 1969, it was founded by Abbot Lungtok Tenpai Nyima. The place is considered to be the best place to witness Tibetan culture. This monastery has recreated the Geshe training program and is home to over 200 monks. Menri in India and Triten Norbutse Monastery in Nepal now host the only two Geshe programs in the Bon lineage.
