= Sangpo Bumtri =

Sangpo Bumtri (Tibetan: སངས་པོ་འབུམ་ཁྲི།, Wylie: sangs po 'bum khri), meaning "Procreator of Beings," is the creator god in the Yungdrung Bön tradition of Tibet. He is revered as the deity who brings forth all beings into the world, and is counted among the Four Transcendent Lords of Bön. His unique nature is described as having "neither eyes to see, nor hands to hold, nor ears to hear, or nose to smell — he has only his spirit."

== Theology & Role ==
Sangpo Bumtri is venerated as the primary creator deity in Yungdrung Bön, analogous to Brahma in Hindu cosmology but firmly rooted in Bön's indigenous tradition. According to scholar Per Kværne, his name is etymologically related to "Tsangpa", which corresponds to the Hindu creator god Brahma, yet he remains an authentic Tibetan figure in his own right. Together with the other three Transcendent Lords, he is regarded as a primordial emanation symbolizing fundamental aspects of the cosmos and spiritual liberation.

== Iconography ==
Sangpo Bumtri is often depicted with a silver-white body seated on a lotus throne supported by snow lions or garuḍas. He holds a victory banner or umbrella in his right hand — a symbol of triumph — while his left hand rests in meditation. These features represent the dual energies of creation and awareness. Thangka paintings from the 11th–19th centuries show him flanked by mythological guardians and emanating forms in a sequence of colors.

Archaeological objects such as bronze sculptures and votive plaques also depict him in meditative posture. A 15th-century bronze, for example, portrays him in karana mudra, symbolizing the overcoming of obstacles, and seated on a throne supported by garuḍas.

== Manifestations ==
In certain Bön scriptures, Sangpo Bumtri is described in **five directional manifestations**, each with a distinct body color (white, blue, red, green, golden) and corresponding lotus throne. These manifestations symbolize his pervasive cosmic functions and emanations.

== Pantheon Context ==
Sangpo Bumtri is counted among the highest deities of Bön, alongside Sherab Chamma (wisdom), Shenlha Ökar (compassion), and Tonpa Shenrab Miwoche (world teacher). Within this structure, he embodies the supreme creative force, worshipped for his role in manifesting existence itself.

== Other representations ==
Thangka series and portable paintings of the “Four Transcendent Lords” preserved in museum collections, including the Rubin Museum of Art and the Field Museum, depict Sangpo Bumtri in prominent positions, attesting to his enduring theological and ritual importance.
