= Lopon =

Tibetan Buddhist title

Lopon is a spiritual degree given in Tibetan Buddhism equal to M. A.
