= Tenga Rinpoche =

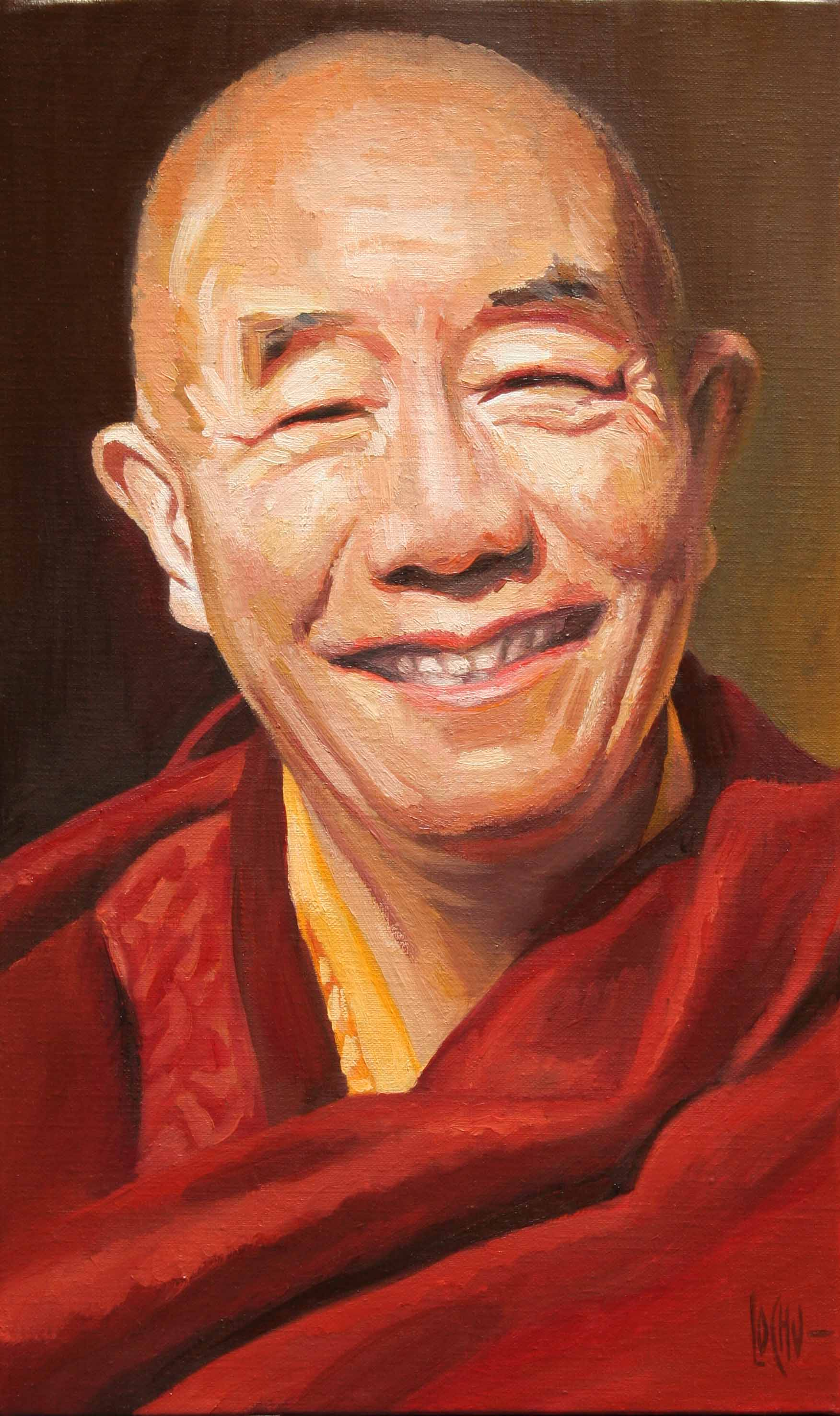
Portrait of Tenga Rinpoche by Claude-Max Lochu

Tenga Rinpoche (Tibetan: བསྟན་དགའ་རིན་པོ་ཆེ་, Wylie: bstan dga' rin po che; 1932 – 30 March 2012) was a Tibetan teacher (lama) in the Karma Kagyu tradition.

Born in Kham in 1932, Tenga Rinpoche was recognized as a reincarnation of Lama Samten at the age of seven.

As he grew older, he studied at Benchen Monastery and was eventually given the name Karma Tenzin Thinle Namgyal from Situ Rinpoche. Soon after, he was given ordination by Situ Rinpoche and entered a three-year retreat.

He was an expert in mandala painting and sculpture.

In 1959, Tenga Rinpoche left Benchen for Lhasa. After the 14th Dalai Lama left Tibet in relation with the 1959 Tibetan uprising, he escaped with Dilgo Khyentse Rinpoche, and the brother of Dilgo Khyentse, the 9th Sangye Nyenpa Rinpoche. He then eventually traveled to northern India. In India, he settled at Rumtek Monastery, the main seat of the 16th Karmapa. Tenga Rinpoche served the 16th Karmapa for seventeen years, nine of those years in the position of Dorje Lopön.

In 1976 Tenga Rinpoche settled in Swayambhunath, Nepal, where he founded a second Benchen Monastery and a retreat center in Pharping.

In 1986, Tenga Rinpoche established the new Benchen Monastery in Kathmandu.

He visited France regularly, giving teachings at Kagyu-Dzong in Paris and Vajradhara-Ling in Aubry-le-Panthou, Normandy. On 21 September 2003, he laid the cornerstone of the Temple for Peace in Normandy.

Rinpoche was a type 1 diabetic. He suffered complications including losing an eye and having a leg amputated.

On 30 March 2012, at 3:24 in the morning Nepali time, Tenga Rinpoche died. He passed 11 days later in a state of Tukdam.

Nyima Döndrup, the yangsi (reincarnation) of the previous Tenga Rinpoche was born 14 December 2014 in Nepal. He was discovered in 2017 following the indications of the 17th Karmapa who met him on 21 March 2017 in Bodhgaya for a ceremony at Tergar Monastery.

== Bibliography ==
- Cho: The Garden of All Joy and Generosity of the Body, trans. Yeshe Gyamtso, Peter O'Hearn, ed. Zhyisil Chokyi Ghatsal Charitable Trust, 2007, ISBN 1-877294-38-1, ISBN 978-1-877294-38-9
- Transition and Liberation: Explanations of Meditation in the Bardo, trans. Alex Wilding, Susanne Schefczyk, ed. Lorenz Dobrot Khampa-Buchverlag, 1999, ISBN 3-9805251-2-0, ISBN 978-3-9805251-2-1
- Gampopa's Mahamudra: The Five-part Mahamudra Practice Taught to Phagmo Drupa by Gampopa, Sgam-po-pa, Phag-mo-gru-pa Rdo-rje-rgyal-po, ed. Padma Karpo Translation Committee, 2008, ISBN 9937-2-0607-3, ISBN 978-9937-2-0607-5
- Visions in Exile p. 193-197, in Brilliant Moon: The Autobiography of Dilgo Khyentse, Dilgo Khyentse, Sogyal Rinpoche, Dzongsar Khyentse, Ani Jinba Palmo, Dalai Lama
- Mahamudra kagyu tradition 10/13/91, New York : ARC Audio-Video, OCLC 48251788
