= Lama Gyurme =

Buddhist Lama and musician

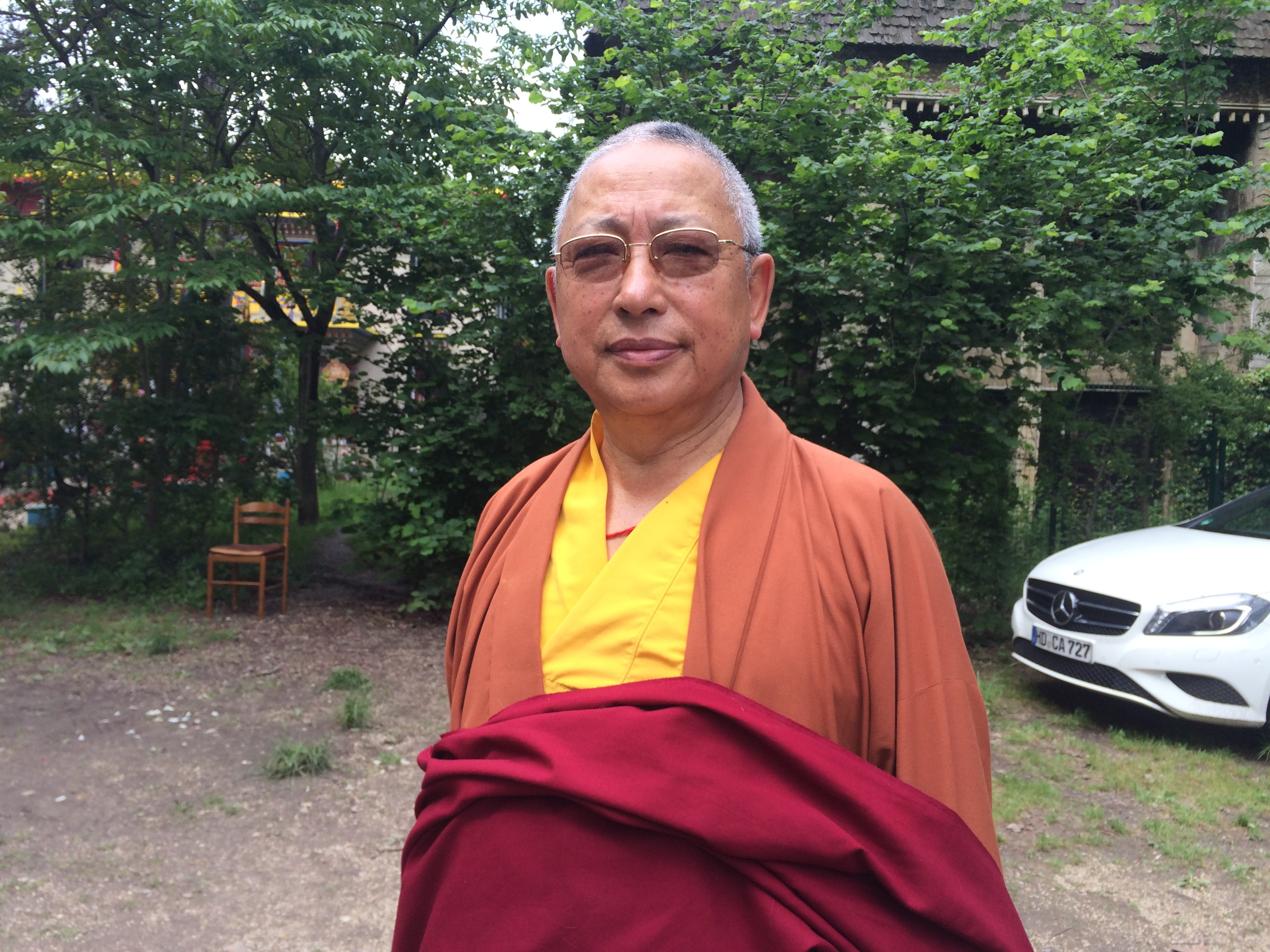
Lama Gyurmé

Lama Gyurme (born in 1948), or Lama Gyourmé, is a Buddhist Bhutanese Lama and musician.

He has lived in France since 1974, and he is the director of the Kagyu-Dzong center in Paris, since 1982, the Vajradhara-Ling center in Aubry-le-Panthou, Normandy and since 2011 the Drayang Gyatso Ling Association in Masnou (Barcelona-Spain) related to mantra chants and meditation.

Born in Bhutan in 1948, he was entrusted by his family at the age of four to the monastery of Djang Tchub Tcheu Ling in Bhutan where his interest in sacred music appeared quickly. At the age of nine, he became a permanent resident of the monastery where he received Buddhist teachings, completed by an initiation to traditional arts, including music.

At the age of 20, he followed his first spiritual retreat of three years, three months and three days, necessary to the formation of Lama, at the monastery of Sonada in India of which the director is Kalu Rinpoche. During this retreat, he was given the title of "Oumze" – master of music – by Kalu Rinpoche. After a stay at the monastery of Rumtek in Sikkim, he fulfilled his religious education in Bhutan before obtaining his diploma of teacher of the Kagyupa tradition that was given to him by the 16th Karmapa.

After being introduced to Jean-Philippe Rykiel by a female disciple of Gyurme's in 1994, the pair went onto collaborate on several projects including the Real World Records album Rain of Blessings: Vajra Chants.

In 1995 and in 1998, Gyurme went on a pilgrimage to Tibet and visited the 17th Karmapa Orgyen Trinley Dorje in the monastery of Tsurphu. He presented him his project of construction of the Temple for Peace.

Gyurme also participated in the music of the 1999 film Himalaya'.

== Discography ==
- Songs of Awakening: The Lama's Chant with Jean-Philippe Rykiel (1995)
- Himalaya - l'enfance d'un chef (participation) (1999)
- Rain of Blessings/Vajra Chants with Jean-Philippe Rykiel (2000)
- Hope for Enlightenment (2000)
- The Lama's Chants (Songs of Awakening/Roads of Blessings) with Jean-Philippe Rykiel and Loy Ehrlich (2004)
- Chants for Peace (Chants pour la Paix) with Jean-Philippe Rykiel (2010)
