= Temple for Peace =

Construction project in Normandy

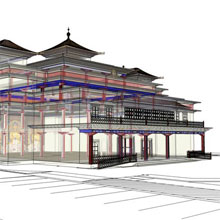
- 3D Image of the Temple for Peace

- France

Religion
- Affiliation: Tibetan Buddhism
- Sect: Kagyu
- Deity: Peace

Location
- Location: Aubry-le-Panthou, Orne, Normandy, France
- Country: France
- Interactive map of Temple for Peace
- Coordinates: 48°51′05″N 0°14′01″E

Architecture
- Founder: Lama Gyurme
- Established: 2010

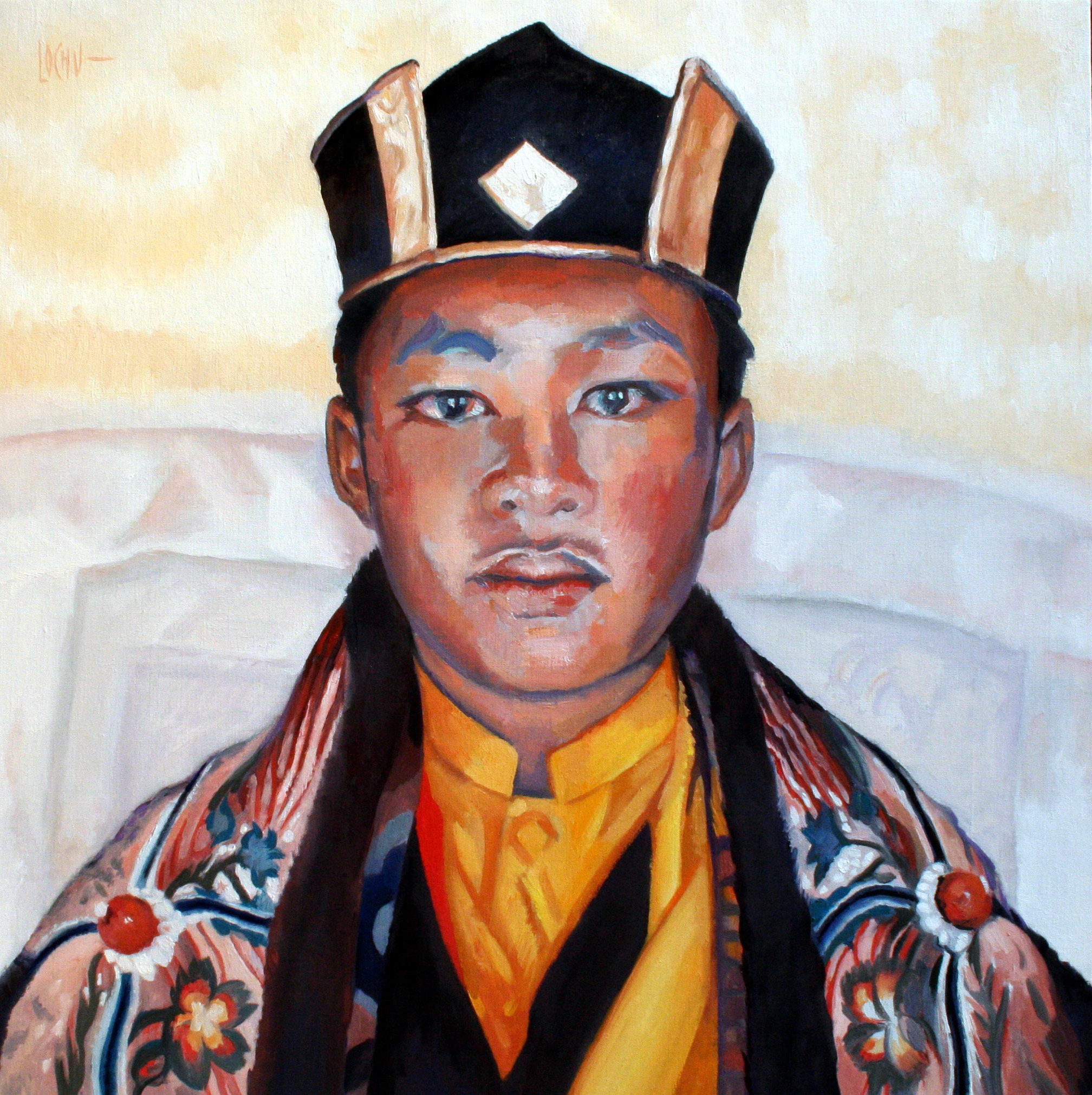
"Gyalwa Karmapa" (Ogyen Trinley Dorje), by painter Claude-Max Lochu, exhibition for the project of Temple for Peace, 2008

The Temple for Peace (French: Temple pour la Paix) is a construction project of the congregation Vajradhara-Ling in Normandy to promote world peace. The cornerstone was laid in 2003 and construction started in 2010. This Temple will be built in the same style as the Samye monastery, the first temple built in Tibet that was founded by Padmasambhava in the 8th century CE.

== Aims of the Temple ==
The aim of the Temple for Peace is not only to share teachings of Tibetan Buddhism but also to welcome demonstrations linked to peace: symposia, inter-religious meetings, expositions and performances. It will be a place to encounter and favor the exchanges between different schools of Buddhism, as well as Christian, Moslem, Jews, and other traditions such as those of Indians of North America and Indigenous Australians. Meetings will be organized between wise representatives of these traditions, enabling a better knowledge of their diversity as well as common values: their contributions in building a better world, mutual tolerance and the respect of others, in particular through peace and non-violence. Conferences will gather recognized personalities working to promote peace, such as Nobel Peace Prize laureates, women and men involved in humanitarian projects, religious dignitaries of different confessions, artists working to promote respect and tolerance between peoples.

== Genesis of the project ==
In 1995 and in 1998, Lama Gyurme visited Tibet in a pilgrimage and met Orgyen Trinley Dorje, the 17th Karmapa at Tsurphu. He presented him his project for construction of a temple for peace.

The authorization to construct the Temple was granted by the French authorities in March 2002.

The cornerstone was laid by Tenga Rinpoche on September 21, 2003.

The project was consecrated by the 14th Dalai Lama on August 14, 2008, at this occasion, the Dalai Lama delivered a speech on peace.

The construction started in 2010.

== Temple architecture ==
The Temple will have a surface area of 3,600 m^{2} on five levels.

== Peace and Light Festival ==
Since 2006, each year at Kagyu-Dzong, the Peace and Light Festival was started to support the construction of the Temple. It includes art exhibition and performances, and takes place in the Pagode de Vincennes. In 2008, it included a concert by Lama Gyurme and Jean-Philippe Rykiel. In 2010, songs by Lama Gyurme were presented by the French actress Véronique Jannot, while Tshering Wangdu also gave a performance.
