= Steve Shehan =

French-American percussionist and composer (born 1957)

- Born: January 18, 1957 (age 69); Fort Eustis, Virginia, U.S.
- Genres: Jazz, world music
- Instruments: Percussion (Djembe, Conga, Goblet drum, Udu, Mbira, Hang)
- Years active: 1976- present
- Member of: Hadouk
- Website: www.steveshehan.com

Steve Shehan (born 18 January 1957 in Fort Eustis, Virginia) is a French-American percussionist and music composer.

== Life ==
Steve Shehan was born in the United States of an American (Cherokee) father and a French mother.

His percussion work has been in demand from some of the biggest names on the Anglo-Saxon and French rock world. He has taken part in numerous albums and collaborated in the studio and on stage with artists and groups like Bob Dylan, Paul Simon, Paul McCartney, Peter Gabriel, Zazie, Carla Bruni, Lokua Kanza, Magma, Stephan Eicher, Liane Foly, Gipsy Kings, Cheb Mami, Arthur H, Salif Keita, Youssou N'Dour, Véronique Sanson, Orchestre national de Lille with conductor Jean-Claude Casadessus, Louis Chedid, Didier Lockwood, Jon Hassell, Rokia Traoré, Nitin Sawhney, John McLaughlin and others.

== Discography ==
Steve Shehan has collaborated with many artists through the world, such as Othmane Bali. He is a member of the group "Hadouk Trio" together with Didier Malherbe and Loy Ehrlich.
