= Vajradhara-Ling =

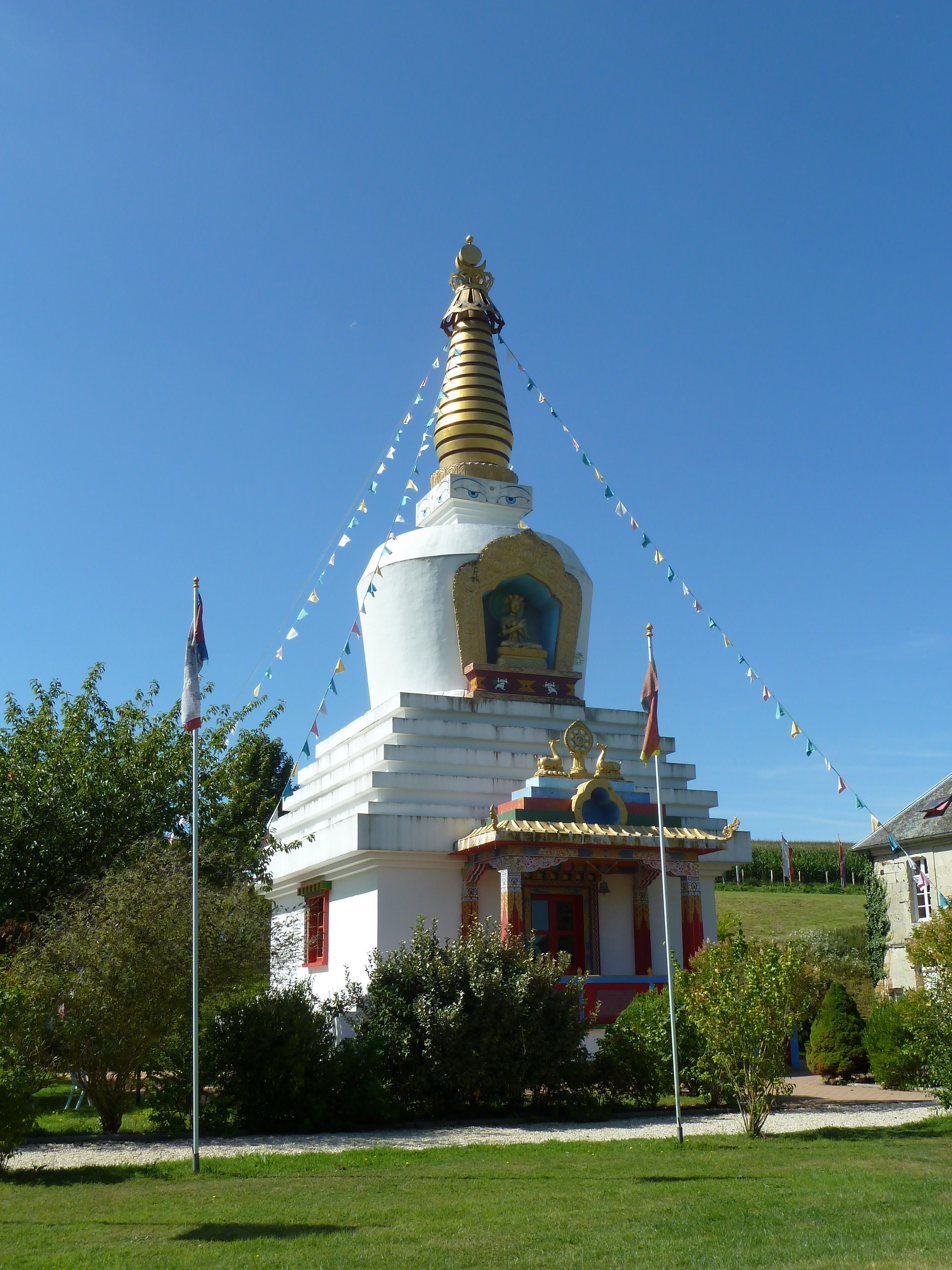
Vajradhara-Ling P1060683

Vajradhara-Ling is a center affiliated to the Karma Kagyu school of Tibetan Buddhism located in France in Normandy in the commune of Aubry-le-Panthou.

== History of the centre ==
Vajradhara-Ling is connected to Kagyu-Dzong in Paris, and both centers are linked to the 17th Karmapa, Orgyen Trinley Dorje. It is said that, before his death, the 16th Karmapa preview the construction of Vajradhara-Ling.

Vajradhara-Ling, meaning « The garden of Vajradhara Buddha », was inaugurated in 1982 by Kalu Rinpoche, who entrusted the responsibility of the centre to his disciple, Lama Gyurme.

The congregation Dashang Kagyu Vajradhara Ling is focusing on Buddhist prayers and practices. It is structured around a Temple, a stupa, a prayer wheel and a center of spiritual retreat. The prayer wheel contains 100 000 pages on which are printed mantras invocating Dorje Sempa, the Buddha of purification.

In 1987, Lama Gyurme initiated the construction of a stupa, which site of construction was consecrated by Kalu Rinpoche and foundations were finished 2 years later. The stupa was dedicated to the memory of the 16th Karmapa. After its construction was completed, the stupa was consecrated by Taï Situ Rinpoche July 15, 1997.

In 1999, the congregation received in donation a property situated 60 km away from the center; it is now named Mahamoudra-Ling and transformed in a retreat center for individuals wishing to practice for 6 months, 1 year or more.

The congregation also bears the project of constructing a Temple for Peace of a size of 700 m^{2}, a future place for teachings, interfaith dialogue, cultural and scientific events, and will be dedicated to Peace in the world. The cornerstone of the building was laid on September 21, 2003 by Tenga Rinpoche. Today, the Congregation continues to collect the funds necessary for the Temple for Peace construction. In August 2008, during a visit in France, the 14th Dalai Lama came to Vajradhara-Ling in particular to consecrate the place where the Temple will be constructed.

== See also ==
- Orgyen Trinley Dorje
- Kagyu-Dzong
- Temple for Peace
- List of Buddhist temples in France
