= Kagyu-Dzong =

Buddhist temple located in Paris, France

Kagyu Dzong
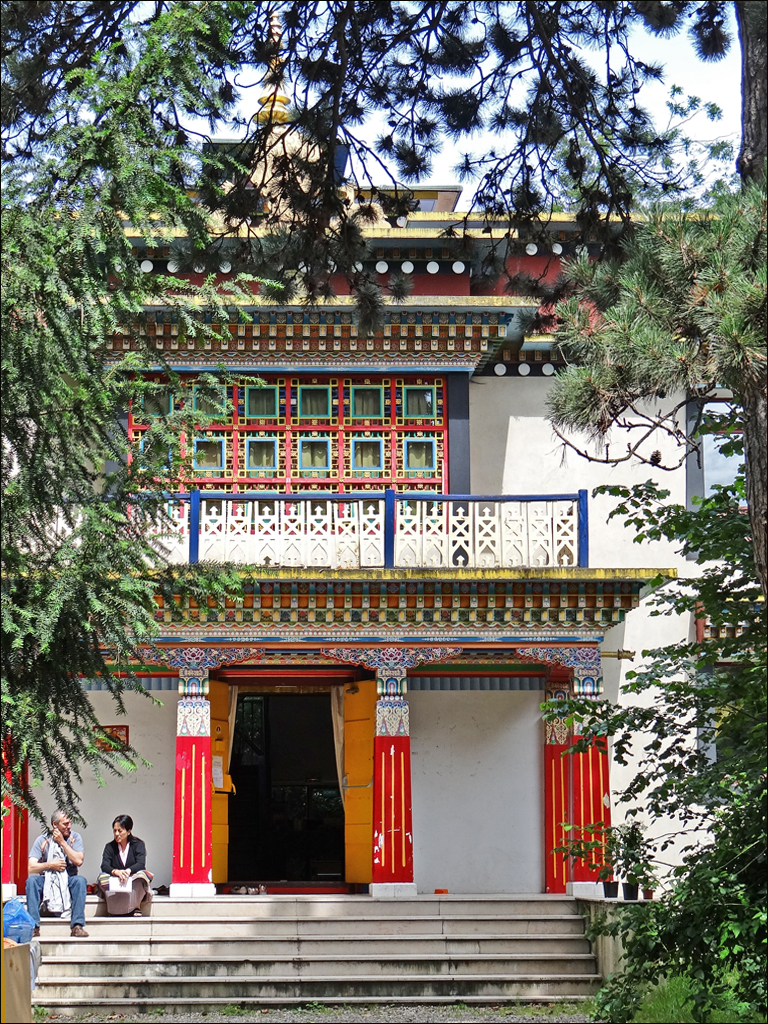
- Kagyu Dzong

- France

Religion
- Affiliation: Tibetan Buddhism
- Sect: Kagyu
- Leadership: Lama Gyurme

Location
- Location: Paris, France
- Country: France
- Interactive map of Kagyu Dzong
- Coordinates: 48°49′43.60″N 2°24′51.40″E

Architecture
- Founder: Kalu Rinpoche
- Established: 2010

The Kagyu-Dzong center is a Buddhist center in Paris, affiliated to the Karma Kagyu school of Tibetan Buddhism. This center is linked to the 17th Karmapa, Orgyen Trinley Dorje.

== History ==
It is situated in a temple of Tibetan and Bhutanese style that was inaugurated January 27, 1985, constructed nearby the "Pagode du bois de Vincennes", site of the Institut international bouddhique founded by Jean Sainteny.

In 1980, Kalu Rinpoche conferred in the Pagode du bois de Vincennes the Initiation of Kalachakra. He then met with Jean Ober, the general secretary of the Institut international bouddhique and together, they conceived a project to construct a Tibetan temple. The plans of the temple, established by the architect Jean-Luc Massot on the directives of Kalu Rinpoche, were approved by the Paris city hall. The first stone was laid on March 20, 1983. The works realized on private founds and with the help of many volunteers took two years.

The Kagyu-Dzong center is linked to the center Vajradhara-Ling in Aubry-le-Panthou, Normandy and Kalu Rinpoche entrusted the responsibility of both centers to his disciple, Lama Gyurme.

Since 2006, each year, an artistic event takes place at Kagyu-Dzong on the theme of "Peace and Light" to support a project of construction of the Temple for Peace nearby the Vajradhara-Ling center.

== See also ==
- Orgyen Trinley Dorje
- Vajradhara-Ling
- Temple for Peace
- List of Buddhist temples in France

== Notes and references ==
- Institut Bouddhique Kagyu-Dzong
