= The Flight of Karmapa =

The Flight of Karmapa is a documentary film about a Karmapa of Tibet who defected to the Dalai Lama. A team of journalists retraces his story across the Himalayas from Tibet to Mustang, Rumtek in Sikkim and Dharamsala in a half-hour documentary, plus two short pieces: "Politics of Reincarnation" on the two rival Karmapas; and "Lost Child" on the real age of Ugyen Trinley.
