= Claude-Max Lochu =

French artist, painter and designer (born 1951)

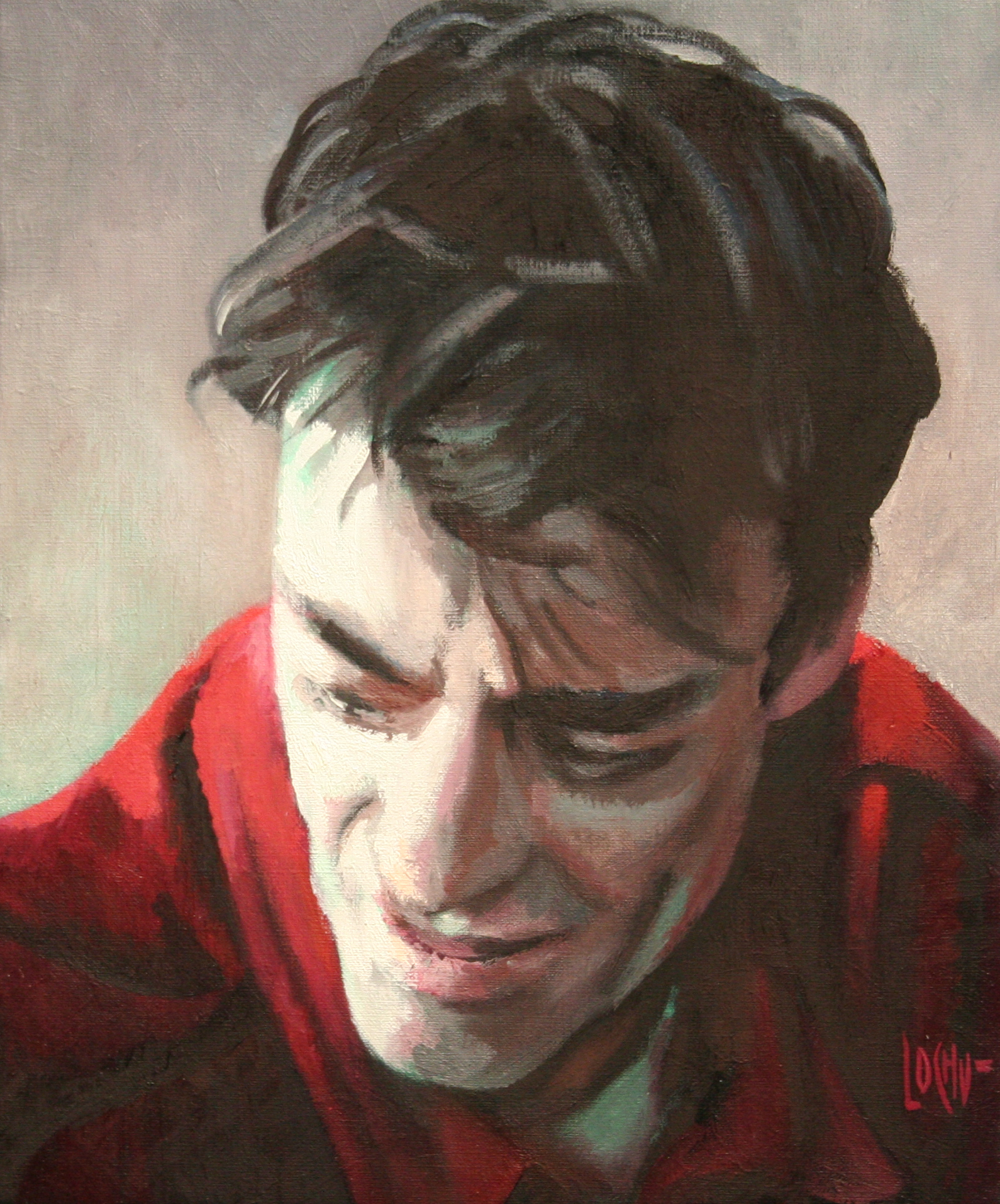
- Autoportait en Rouge et Gris, 46 x 38 cm, 2009, oil on canevas
- Born: 1951 (age 74–75); Delle
- Education: Jean Ricardon, Shiko Itoh
- Known for: Painting

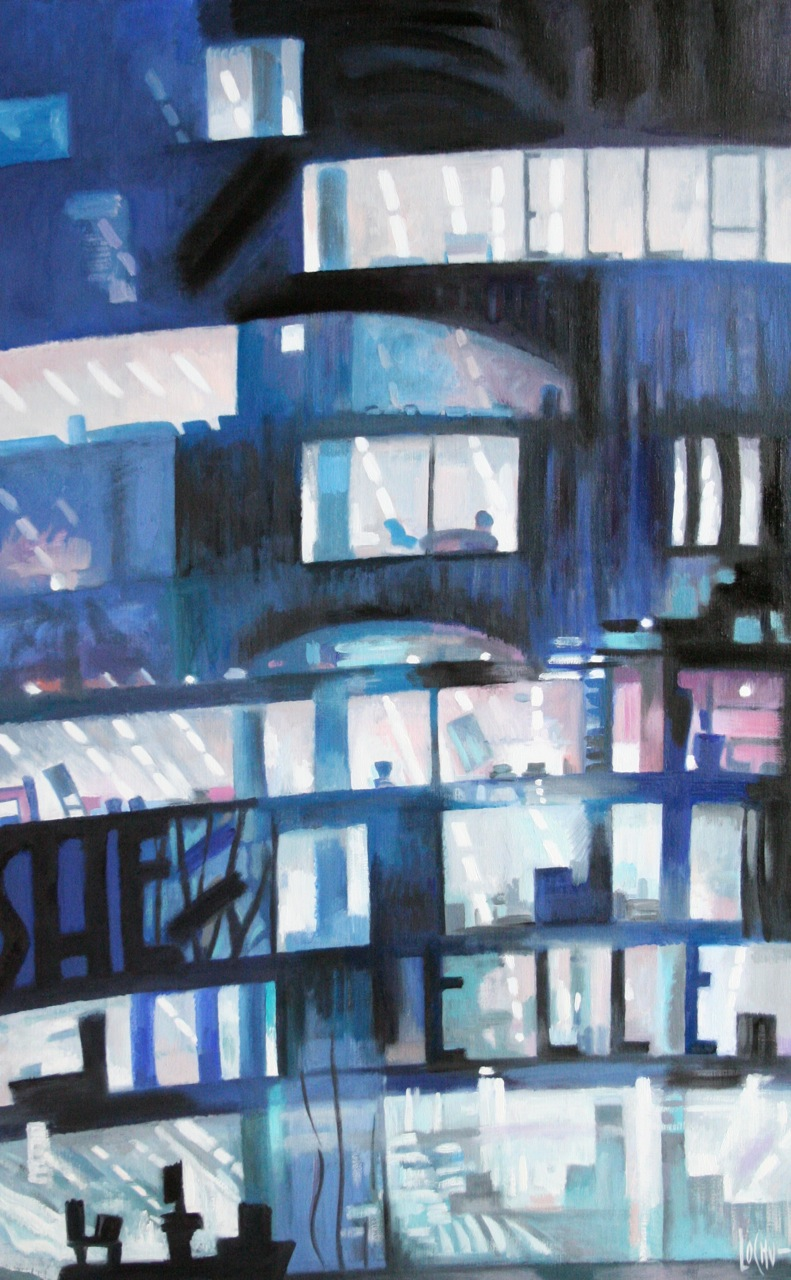
"Urban Night Writing", 2010, 116 x 73cm, oil on canvas, Claude-Max Lochu

Claude-Max Lochu (born 1951) is a French artist, painter and designer.

Lochu was born in Delle in Territoire de Belfort, Franche-Comté and completed his degree at the École des Beaux-Arts of Besançon. Lochu was exhibited in the Museum of Fine Arts, Dole, and is now exhibited permanently in Faure Museum as well as in 2 galleries in Paris and Lyon.

== Biography ==
Claude-Max Lochu completed his National Diploma of Painting at Art School in Besançon (atelier Jean Ricardon) in 1975 and first exhibited his works in 1976 in Rabat and Tanger, Morocco. In 1979, he set up in Paris and exhibited his work at the Montrouge Contemporary Art Show in 1981 and 1982. During a first trip to Japan in 1982, he studied the Sumi-é, an ink painting technique, with the Japanese painter Shiko Itoh. In 1985, he returned to Japan to visit Hiroshige's Tōkaidō road between Kyoto and Tokyo, and was inspired by the concept of fueki ryūkō, permanence and movement, developed by Bashō, the haiku poet. Lochu was exhibited at the Museum of Fine Arts, Dole in 1985.

Claude-Max Lochu also works on still life, interiors, landscapes of south of Europe, such as Mont Ventoux and Sorgue in Luberon, Aix-les-Bains, Valley Di Cecina and Volterra, where he looks for poetry rather than the representation. In addition to his works at the Artima gallery in Paris, Lochu exhibited at Faure Museum of Aix-les-Bains. Since 2001, he has held personal exhibitions at the Accademia libera natura e cultura in Querceto in Italia. Since 2006, he has participated in the Peace and Light Festival for the project of Temple for Peace to be built by the Vajradhara-Ling Center in, Aubry-le-Panthou, Normandy with a view to promoting world peace.

In 2000 at Faure Museum, he exhibited Aix les Bains depuis le Boulevard des Anglais, a painting that he performed on his first visit at Aix-les-Bains which is now exposed in the entrance of the museum. It represents an overview of the city and landscape. In 2012, his portrait of Auguste Rodin is added to the collections of the museum.

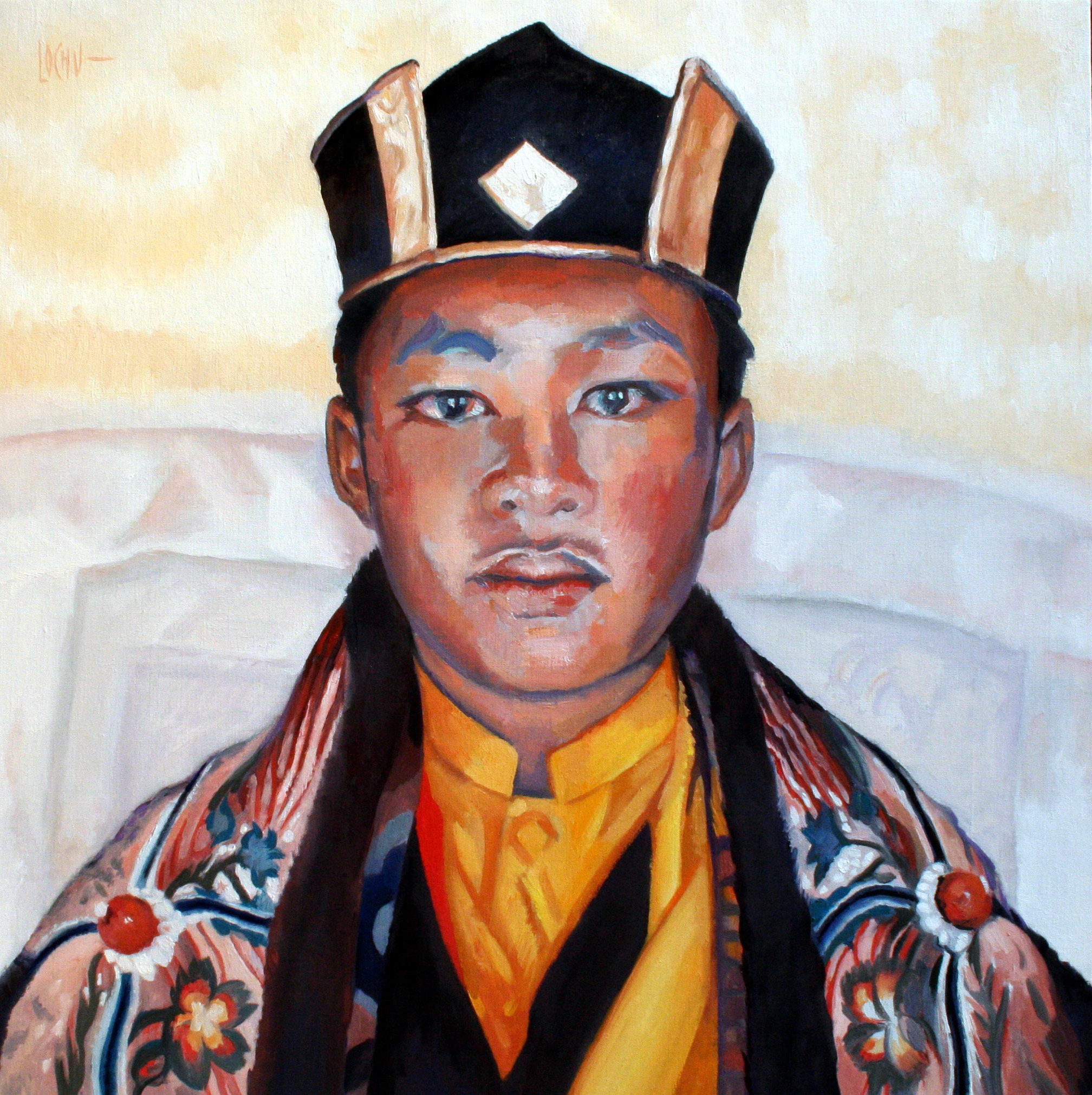
"Gyalwa Karmapa" (Ogyen Trinley Dorje), by Claude-Max Lochu, exhibition for the project of Temple for Peace in France, 2008

In 2012, he exhibited at the Faure Museum in Savoie.

In 2013, he exhibited at the Musée des beaux-arts de Gaillac in the Tarn.

From July to September 2013, 26 of his oil paintings, gouaches and drawings are presented at the Musée de l'Aventure Peugeot in Sochaux in the Doubs.

The visitor center of the Pays des Impressionnistes, focused on Impressionists who painted along the Seine River, organized a tour of his atelier in January 2014 in Carrières-sur-Seine.

In March 2016, he exhibited at the Gavart gallery, rue d'Argenson in Paris.

In May and June 2017, an exhibition of his paintings entitled Voyages is held at the Jean Vilar cultural center in Marly-le-Roi.

From June to August 2018, he is one of the 37 artists to participate in Jubilons → Jubilez – Rétrospective et Perspectives, the last exhibition organized at the Faure museum by its curator, André Liatard.

In 2017, he moved to Arles, where he produced a series of landscapes and exhibits at the Galerie Cezar in 2021.

Claude-Max Lochu is participating in the 2nd edition of the National Artists' Days from October 2nd to 4th, 2026 at the Atelier du Refuge in Arles at the invitation of Pasquale Noizet, where he is exhibiting a series entitled "Words in the Image".

== Publications ==
- Catalogue of exhibition of Claude-Max Lochu, 1985, Musée des Beaux-Arts de Dole
- Illustrations of La Princesse qui aimait les chenilles by René de Ceccatty in collaboration with Ryôji Nakamura, 1987, éditions Hatier, ISBN 2218078589
- Claude Max Lochu : exposition, Aix-les-Bains, Musée Faure, 7 avril-15 mai 2000, éditeur Aix-les-Bains : Musée Faure, 2000, ISBN 2908214075
- Claude-Max Lochu: Pour solde de tout compte : expositions, Musée Faure, Aix-les-Bains, 7 avril-17 juin 2012 et Musée des beaux-arts, Gaillac, 1er trimestre 2013, éditeur Musée Faure, 2012, ISBN 2357570229
- Claude-Max Lochu, Bruno Smolarz, Objets intranquilles & autres merveilles Atéki éditions, 2021, ISBN 9782957345212
