= Lama Jigme Rinpoche (Kagyu) =

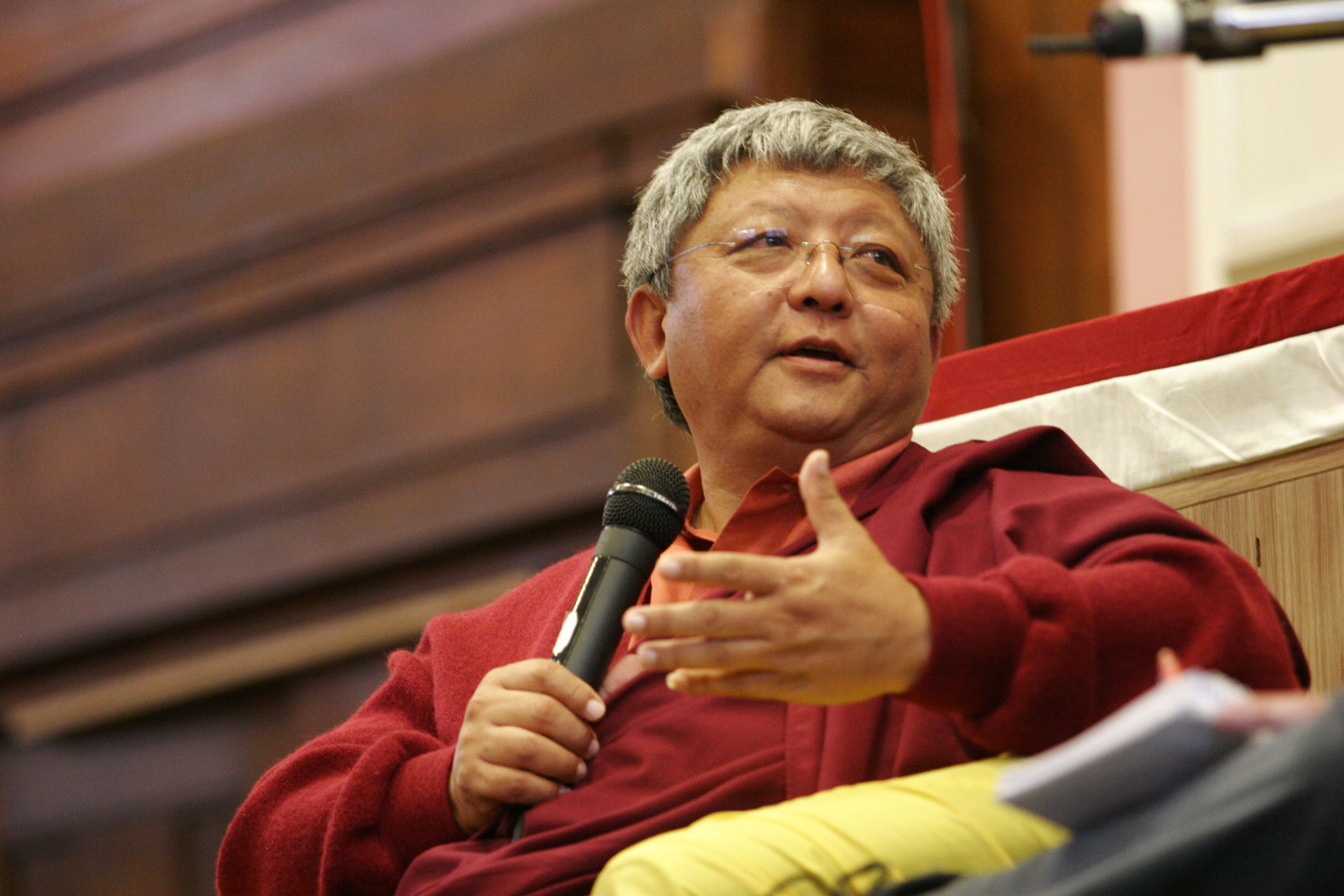
- Lama Jigme Rinpoche, 2005
- Title: Rinpoche

Personal life
- Born: 1949 (age 76–77) Dergé, Kham, Tibet

Religious life
- Religion: Tibetan Buddhism
- School: Karma Kagyu

Senior posting
- Teacher: Rangjung Rigpe Dorje, 16th Karmapa
- Website: https://www.jigmela.org/

Lama Jigme Rinpoche (Tibetan: བླ་མ་འཇིགས་མེད་རིན་པོ་ཆེ་, Wylie: bla ma jigs med rin po che; born 1949, Kham) is an author and teacher in the Karma Kagyu school of Tibetan Buddhism. Born into the family of Rangjung Rigpe Dorje, 16th Karmapa, he is the brother of the late 14th Shamar Rinpoche, Mipham Chokyi Lodro. The 16th Karmapa appointed Lama Jigme Rinpoche as his European representative. He asked him to oversee the development of a shedra (university), library, retreat center, and monastery at Dhagpo Kagyu Ling in Dordogne, France, where Jigme Rinpoche is currently the main representative of Trinley Thaye Dorje and head of the monastery.

== History ==
On March 13, 1959, Lama Jigme Rinpoche fled the Chinese invasion of Tibet, together with the 16th Karmapa and other high lamas. They left Tsurphu through the border of Bhutan on foot and by horse. The Karmapa rebuilt Rumtek Monastery in Sikkim in order to preserve the teachings. It was there that Jigme Rinpoche received all the transmissions directly from the Karmapa, alongside the Karma Kagyu lineage holders. From 1961 to 1970, Jigme Rinpoche was the Karmapa's assistant at Rumtek Monastery.

Jigme Rinpoche accompanied the 16th Karmapa on his journey from Rumtek to Europe in 1974. They offered Buddhist teachings and meditation practices to Westerners. During this visit, Rangjung Rigpe Dorje designated a property donated to him by Bernard Benson in Dordogne as his central seat of activity. He asked Jigme Rinpoche to live there, and oversee construction and spiritual development. He also asked Gendün Rinpoche and Pawo Rinpoche to move to the property. When the 16th Karmapa appointed Lama Jigme Rinpoche as director of Dhagpo Kagyu Ling he said, "In the person of Lama Jigme Rinpoche, I leave you my heart". Jigme Rinpoche acted as the representative of Rumtek in several European countries (the seat of the Karma Kagyu lineage in India after leaving Tibet) starting in 1980.

In 1977 the 16th Karmapa made a second journey to the West. The donation of the property in France was finalized. Karmapa blessed the site and gave the center its final name of "Dhagpo Kagyu Ling", named after the site where the historic lineage holder Gampopa taught.

He became a French citizen.

== Activity ==
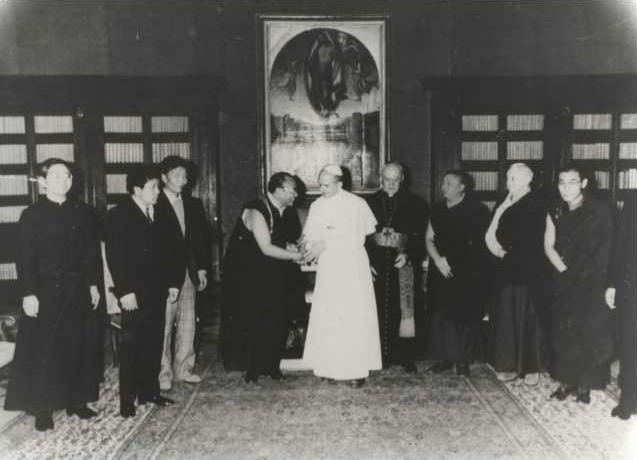
Rangjung Rigpe Dorje, 16th Karmapa with Pope Paul VI and Lama Jigme (second from the right of the Pope) at the Vatican on 17 January 1975

Lama Jigme Rinpoche played a significant role in ushering in Tibetan Buddhism in the West through the establishment of Dhagpo Kagyu Ling in France, which has been called the "mother centre" of Buddhism in France, and which receives visitors interested in learning about Buddhism from all over France throughout the year. In addition, Dhagpo Kagyu Ling has acted as a repository for Buddhist teachings, with 20–30,000 microfiche texts stored in its libraries. Jigme Rinpoche also travels regularly throughout France to provide Buddhist teachings. He is the author of four books about Buddhism: The Manual of Ordinary Heroes; The Bodhisattavas' Way, A Path of Wisdom, and Working with Emotions. Excerpts of Jigme Rinpoche's public lectures about various Buddhist subjects, including accomplishing benefit or merit, the Karma Kagyu transmission, guru yoga meditation, the 16th Karmapa and Karma Kagyu Buddhism in the West, his experiences with the 16th Karmapa, and working with emotions have been translated and published in English in the periodical Buddhism Today.

Jigme Rinpoche received all the significant empowerments and teachings from the 16th Karmapa, and was able to pass them on to his close students. Jigme Rinpoche was close with Gendün Rinpoche, Pawo Rinpoche, Kalu Rinpoche and Dilgo Khyentse. He received empowerments and teachings from them as well as numerous empowerments and teachings from important Nyingma lamas including Dudjom Rinpoche.

By 1998, Frédéric Lenoir organized a dialogue between Lama Jigme Rinpoche and Robert Le Gall that resulted in the publication of the book Le Moine et le lama (French for 'The Monk and the Lama') in 2000 at Fayard.

Michaël de Saint-Cheron published his own dialogue with Lama Jigmé Rinpoche in his book La condition humaine et le temps (French for 'The Human Condition and Time'). The book describes Jigme Rinpoche as one of the great thinkers of our time, and in it he gives a Buddhist spiritual perspective on the idea of time, aging and death.

== Selected works ==
- A Path of Wisdom. Rabsel Publications (2019). ISBN 9782953721652
- The Handbook of Ordinary Heroes: The Bodhisattvas' Way". Rabsel Publications (2019) ISBN 9782360170036
- The Monk and the Lama: The Heart of Buddhist Meditation. Fayard (2013).ISBN 978-3944885209
- Working with the Emotions (Bodhi Path Buddhist Teachings). CreateSpace Independent Publishing Platform (2004). ISBN 978-1724834386
