= Othmane Bali =

Othamne Bali
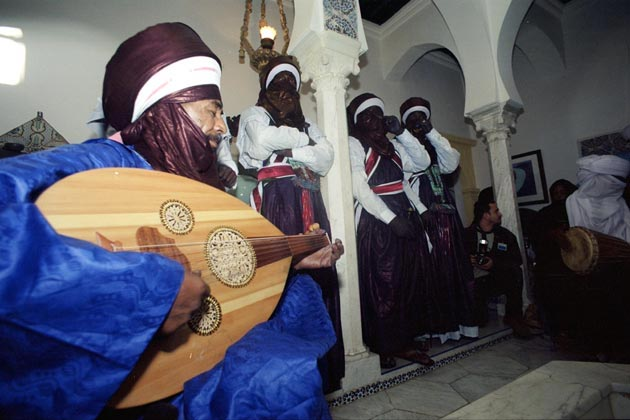
- Othmane Bali in Algiers

Background information
- Born: Mbarek Athmane; May 1953; Djanet, Algeria
- Died: 17 June 2005 (aged 52) Djanet, Algeria
- Genres: Touareg music, world music
- Occupations: Musician, singer
- Instruments: Oud, vocals

Mbarek Athmane known as Othmane Bali, (May 1953 – 17 June 2005) was an Algerian Tuareg singer.

== Life ==
Bali issued his first album in 1986, and afterward worked on promoting Tuareg music in the Tamahaq language. Bali worked with world-famous singers such as Steve Shehan. In 1999 they recorded the album, "AssikelIt" and in 2008 the album was released on the Safar Productions label. The 5th song on the album, "Wagh Azaman", was covered as tribute by the Tuareg band, TissilaWen in February of 2025 and widely praised on social media platforms.

== Death ==
Bali died in an accident in his car after the flooding of a river in his native region of Djanet. After his death, his son Nabil Bali continued his legacy and took the same path as his father.
