= The Seine at Argenteuil (Sisley) =

Painting by Alfred Sisley

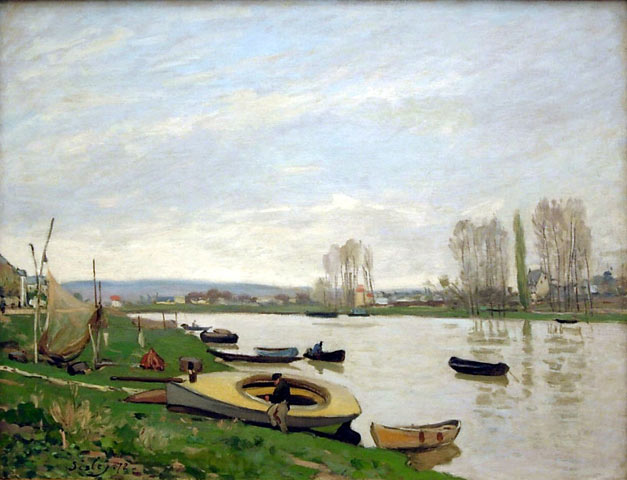
- Artist: Alfred Sisley
- Year: 1872
- Medium: oil on canvas
- Dimensions: 50 cm × 60.5 cm (20 in × 23.8 in)
- Location: Faure Museum; Aix-les-Bains, France

The Seine at Argenteuil is an 1872 painting by Alfred Sisley, now in the Musée Faure in Aix-les-Bains. It was acquired by the doctor and art-lover Jean Faure, who left it to the city.

== See also ==
- List of paintings by Alfred Sisley
