= Musée des Beaux-Arts de Dole =

Museum in Dole, France

Musée des Beaux-Arts et d'Archéologie de Dole
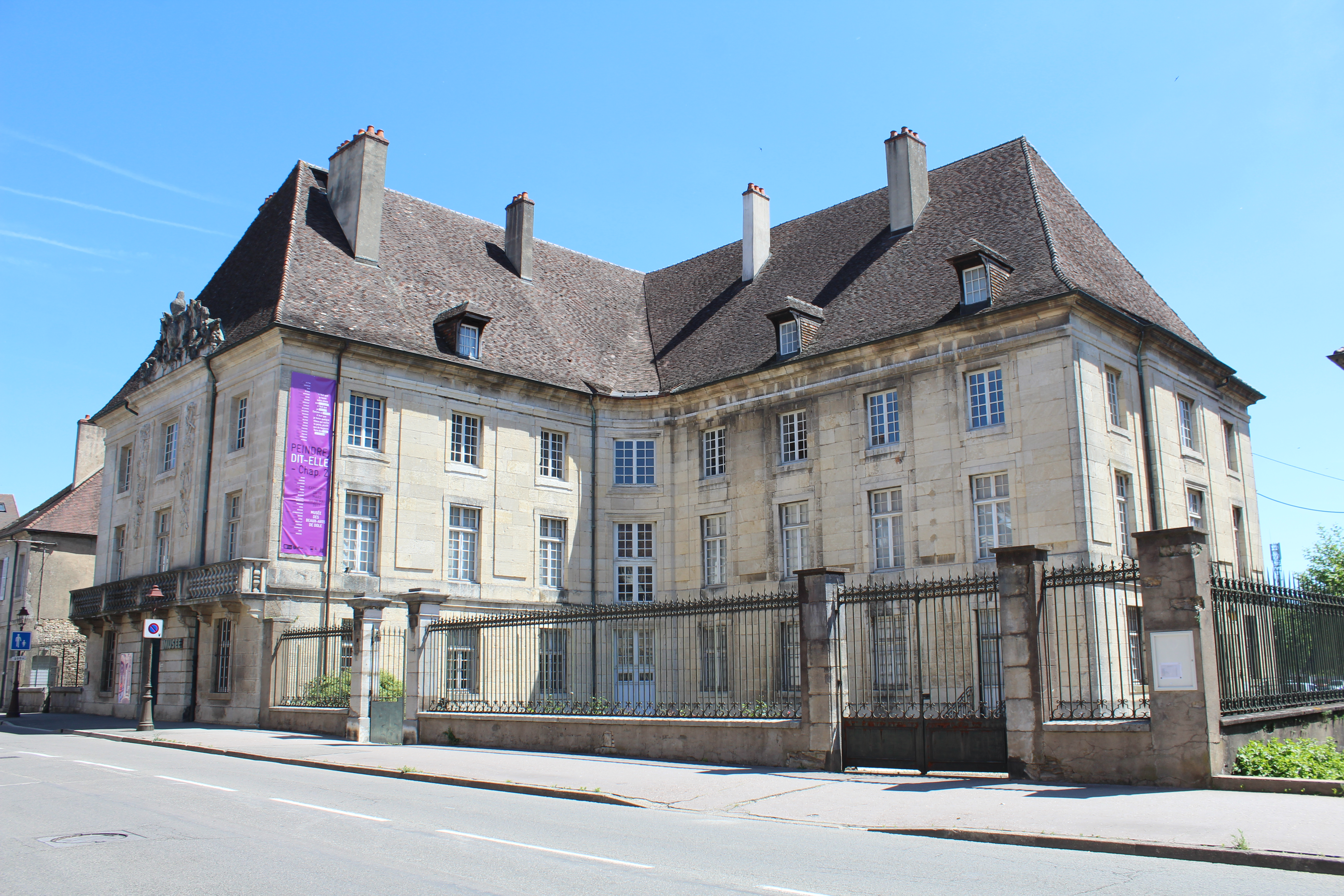

- Location within France
- Established: 1821
- Location: Pavillon des Officiers 85, rue des Arènes 39100 Dole
- Coordinates: 47.0894°N 5.4887°E
- Type: Art museum
- Website: Musée des Beaux-Arts de Dole

The Musée des Beaux-Arts et d'Archéologie de Dole is a museum in Dole, in the department of Jura, France. Founded in 1821, it has been housed since 1980 in the Pavillon des Officiers, an example of the military architecture of Franche-Comté from the 18th century.

== Collections ==
The collections comprise three sections: archaeology, ancient art and contemporary art.

Archaeology: Archeological discoveries in the area of Jura, from the Neolithic to the Merovingian era.

Ancient art:

- Burgundian sculpture, and that of Franche-Comté, from the Middle Ages to the 18th century (G. Lullier, F.-M. Rosset, Claude-François Attiret).
- 17th- and 18th-century French paintings (Simon Vouet, Étienne Allegrain, Charles-Antoine Coypel), Italian Old Master paintings (Giambattista Pittoni, Francesco Albani, Luca Giordano, Gioacchino Assereto) and Northern ones (the Master of Saint Giles, Peter van Boucle, Cornelis Norbertus Gijsbrechts).
- 19th-century paintings (Johan Jongkind, Gustave Courbet), in particular by local artists (J.-D. Attiret, A. Pointelin, J. Machard, G. Brun).
- The history of Franche-Comté is represented by battle scenes painted by Adam Frans van der Meulen, Martin des Batailles and Martin des Gobelins.

Contemporary art:

- Paintings by artists active in France since the 1960s having for theme art and corporation: the Narrative Figuration (Fromanger, Rancillac, Monory, Erró) and the New Realism (Arman, Villeglé, Deschamps).
- Temporary exhibitions:
  - 1985: Claude-Max Lochu, Erró
  - 1987: Yayoi Kusama
  - 1991: Charlemagne Palestine
  - 1994: Peter Stampfli
  - 1997: Yan Pei-Ming
  - 1999: Jacques Monory
  - 2000: Peter Saul
  - 2003: Bernard Rancillac
  - 2004: Gérard Deschamps
  - 2005: Gérard Fromanger
  - 2006: Helen Frik: The Frik Collection
  - 2006: La Figuration Narrative
  - 2007: La sculpture du XVe siècle en Franche-Comté
  - 2008: Swetlana Heger
  - 2009: Jean-Olivier Hucleux
  - 2010: Erró. 50 ans de collages
  - 2011: Ida Tursic et Wilfried Mille
  - 2012: Laurent Pécheux
  - 2013: Philippe Cognée
  - 2013: Gérard Schlosser
