= Gumbass =

The gumbass is a French musical instrument. It is a cross between a guembri and an electric bass.

The gumbass was invented by musician Loy Ehrlich. He plays the instrument in the musical group Hadouk Trio.

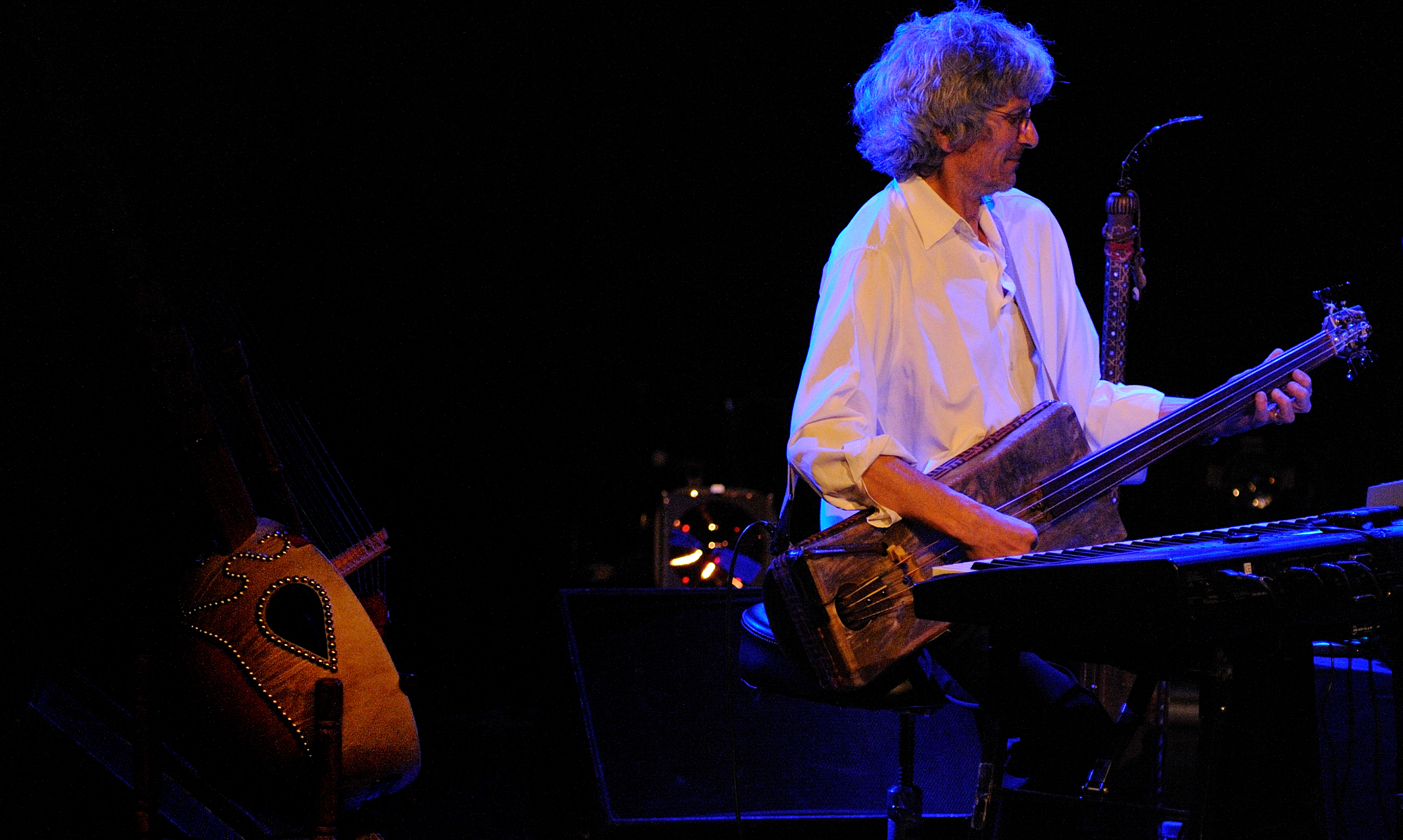
Loy Ehrlich playing the gumbass
