= Faure Museum (Aix-les-Bains) =

Museum Faure
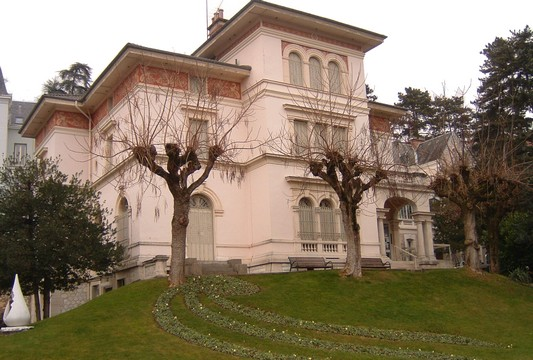
- Faure Museum at Aix-les-Bains

- Location within France
- Established: 1949
- Location: Villa les Chimères 10 boulevard des Côtes 73100 Aix-les-Bains
- Coordinates: 45.691944°N 5.915833°E
- Type: Art museum
- Visitors: 15 437 (2003)
- Curator: André Liatard
- Website: www.aixlesbains.fr/culture/musee_faure

The Faure Museum is an art museum situated at Aix-les-Bains in France in the department of Savoie. It is a museum of France, according to the law n°2002-5 of January 4, 2002. It was founded in 1949 and comprised initially artworks from the private collection of Doctor Jean Faure (1862–1942), bequeathed to the city. The Faure Museum possesses the second collection in France of works by Rodin and the second collection of Impressionist paintings of France.

== Infrastructures ==
=== Building ===
The Faure Museum is installed in a villa of Italian style, The Villa des Chimères (Villa of the Pipe Dreams). It was constructed in 1902. This building is of Genoese style from the 19th century. It possesses an entry surround by two columns. Its facade is decorated by a painted border representing stylized pipe dreams. The museum is open to the public, and wheelchair-accessible throughout.

=== Garden ===
The museum proposes a freely accessible garden to the public. There are several artworks in the garden among which a statue of Alfred Boucher and a statue of Mars Vallett, Enfants sous la neige (Children under the snow).

== Collections ==
The Faure Museum shelters the collections constituted by Doctor Faure, between the two world wars, composed of Impressionist paintings and sculptures, gathered along with his Parisian frequentations and particularly with the Parisian art dealer André Shoeller.

=== Sculpture ===
The Faure Museum possesses the second collection in France of works of Rodin (33 sculptures and studies)

=== Paintings ===
A remarkable collection of Impressionist paintings—and works by painters close by Impressionism, as those of Romanticism, Post-Impressionism and Symbolism—was gathered, mainly by Doctor Faure, and further enriched with time by new acquisitions.

One can admire works of painters such as Corot, Boudin, Jongkind, Ravier, Puy, Cézanne, Sisley, Pissarro, Degas, Bonnard, Vuillard, Lebourg, Lebasque, Marquet, Robert Louis Antral, Charles Cottet, Jules Desbois, Edmond Aman-Jean, John Singer Sargent, Victor Vignon, Constant Troyon, Stanislas Lépine and also Adolphe Monticelli, Georges Michel, Jean Victor Bertin, Claude-Max Lochu...

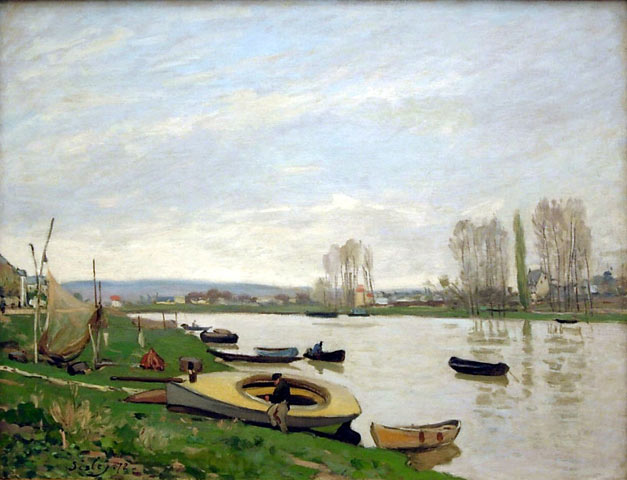
La Seine à Argenteuil by Alfred Sisley, 1872

Among the works in the collection:

- Judith Gautier by John Singer Sargent
- Paysage à Montgeron, Camille Corot
- Vue de Bonnières, Paul Cézanne
- Plage à Trouville, Eugène Boudin
- Pommier sous le soleil, Camille Pissarro
- L'écuyère, Pierre Bonnard
- Danseuses mauves, Edgar Degas
- La Seine à Argenteuil (1872), Alfred Sisley
- Aix les Bains depuis le Boulevard des Anglais and Portrait d'Auguste Rodin, Claude-Max Lochu

=== Other ===
- A body of memories of the stays in Aix-les-Bains of the poet Lamartine, in particular the reconstruction suggestive of his room in the pension Perrier where he lived in 1816 at the time of his meeting with Julie Charles.
- A collection of earthenwares and of ceramics, coming from the first museum of Aix-les-Bains, founded in 1872 by the painter and printmaker Ludovic Napoléon Lepic, friend of Degas.
- An eclectic collection of paintings and sculptures of the 17th to 20th century including Foujita, Fantin-Latour, Hayez, Carpeaux, Alfred Boucher, and Barye.

== Expositions temporaries ==
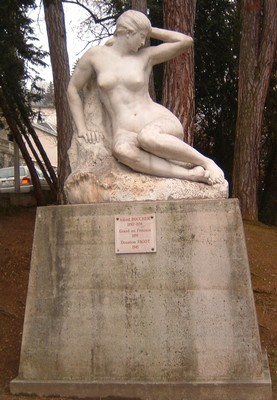
Statue by Alfred Boucher in the garden

The museum Faure organizes five temporary expositions per year. Here below a list of expositions having been organized within the museum:

- 1987 : Jean-Michel Alberola
- 1999 : Julien Bouvier
- 2000 : Claude-Max Lochu
- 2001 : Catherine Viollet
- 2004 : Henriette Deloras
- 2006 : 12 artists around Michel Butor
- 2007 : Around Guernica, preparatory drawings from the painter Picasso for his monumental picture Guernica.

== Attendance ==
Attendance of the museum calculated in number of entries.

- 2000: 10 782 entries
- 2001: 13 272 entries
- 2002: 13 018 entries
- 2003: 15 437 entries

== Anecdotes ==
November 16, 1981, the museum was the target of a burglary. Two pictures of high value disappeared, one by Camille Pissarro and one by Renoir. On May 2, 2003, the curator of the museum, André Liatard, was warned by Sotheby's New York of the sale of a picture by Pissarro entitled Le marché aux poissons (monotype of 20 x 15 cm) that by vigilance had been identified in the database of the Art Loss Register. The sale was then blocked at the request of the curator. An investigation started. It showed Emile Guelton had sold the painting at a gallery of art of San Antonio for $6,000 to $7,000. This salesman was known for flights of works of art. The city of Aix-les-Bains made efforts to recover the stolen work. The duality of the legislations of the United States and France in the matter being complex, the city decided to propose a sum of 4 750 € to recover the picture and compensate the current owner in the US. The New York court should soon take a decision. In case of acceptance, the picture will be able to be recovered at the embassy of the United States in Paris.

== See also ==
- Aix-les-Bains
