= Second Beru Khyentse =

Beru Khyentse Rinpoche
- Born: 1947 (age 78–79); Tibet

The Second Beru Khyentse (born 1947), born Thupten Sherap is a lineage holder of the Karma Kagyu school of Tibetan Buddhism and the third reincarnation of Jamyang Khyentse Wangpo (1820–1892).

== Birth ==
Known as Palpung Beru Khyentse or Drongsar Khyentse Chokyi Wangpo, he was born in 1947 (15th day of the 6th lunar month) in Nyêtang, Central Tibet, 25 kilometres (16 mi) west of the capital Lhasa.

== Lineage ==
Jamyang Khyentse Wangpo was an important illuminator of Buddhism in Tibet, propagating Dharma impartially to all.

Several reincarnations or emanations of Jamyang Khyentse Wangpo, including those of body, speech, mind, qualities and activity, are recognized in Tibet. The person recognised as the speech emanation became the 1st Beru Khyentse (1896–1945) in the person of Karma Jamyang Khyentse Özer, son of the ruler of the principality of Beru, Gönpo Düdul, in Kham (eastern Tibet). He was later enthroned at Palpung Monastery, which would become the seat for all his activities. The 1st Beru Khyentse had many non-sectarian disciples from the Sakya, Gelug, Kagyu and Nyingma traditions. Some from the Kagyu school were the 15th Karmapa (he was both his Guru as well as his disciple), the 16th Karmapa, Nenang Pawo Rinpoche, Kyabje Kalu Rinpoche, Khandro Orgyen Tsomo (consort of the 15th Karmapa).

== Activity ==
As a young monk, the 2nd Beru Khyentse was recognized as tulku and enthroned by the 16th Karmapa in 1955. At the age of thirteen he led his monks and lay devotees from his monastery in Nangchen, out of Tibet, and established a community including monastery and retreat for them in Mainpat, India. He completed extensive studies in Buddhist philosophy and training in Vajrayana rituals, receiving instruction from many Lamas including Dzongsar Khenpo Chimey Rinpoche, Kyabje Kalu Rinpoche, the 16th Karmapa, Khunu Rinpoche, Sakya Trizin and Dilgo Khyentse Rinpoche. After completing the traditional four-year retreat in the Karma Kagyu tradition, he established monasteries in Bodh Gaya (Karma Dhargye Chokhorling Monastery) and Kathmandu and the Nangchen monastery, nunnery, institute and the three-year retreat centre in Tibet.

In 1979, the 16th Karmapa appointed him as his representative to Australia and New Zealand. Later he founded his own center Tashi Choling in Australia.

The 2nd Beru Khyentse also rebuilt the Sakya monastery, Nyenthang Tashigang, near his birthplace in Tibet and founded the Tharjay Charitable Foundation to sponsor bridges, schools, clinics and medical treatment for the nomads of eastern Tibet. Since the 1980s Beru Khyentse has been teaching and travelling to many countries around the world, presenting the Dharma in the spirit of non-sectarianism and in a manner suitable for all students from beginners to the most advanced practitioners. These countries includes: Australia, New Zealand, Malaysia, Singapore, Thailand, Indonesia, Hong Kong, Philippines, Taiwan, China, Bhutan, India, Nepal and many countries in Europe, North America and South America. More than 20,000 people became Buddhist practitioners and over 150,000 received blessings, Dharma teachings and empowerment from Beru Khyentse Rinpoche.
