= Pagode de Vincennes =

Pagode de Vincennes (Pagoda of the Bois de Vincennes)
- Pagode de Vincennes (Pagoda of the Bois de Vincennes)
- 48°49′43″N 2°24′55″E
- Location: 18th arrondissement of Paris
- Country: France
- Denomination: Buddhism

Architecture
- Groundbreaking: 1858
- Completed: 1861

The Pagode du bois de Vincennes is the seat of l'Union Bouddhiste de France (the Buddhist Union of France) founded by Jean Sainteny who was the manager of the Institut International Bouddhique. It is located in a former building of the International Colonial Exposition of 1931, designed by the architect Louis-Hippolyte Boileau. On this 8 000 m^{2} site on the edge of the lac Daumesnil are located two buildings of remarkable architecture. The largest, the former pavilion of Cameroon, was restored in 1977 and transformed in a pagoda and a place of worship. The second is the former pavilion of Togo is slated for restoration by the City of Paris. It will contain a library for texts on the various Buddhist traditions.

The Pagode du bois de Vincennes is used by Buddhist schools of the Parisian region and has no religious leader. The pagoda is a place of common worship; it shelters the largest Buddha statue in Europe, covered with gold leaf and measuring, including its seat, more than 9 meters high. The Pagode du bois de Vincennes has housed relics of the historical Buddha since 2008.

A Tibetan buddhist temple named Kagyu-Dzong exists in front of the Pagode de Vincennes.

== Access ==
The Pagode du bois de Vincennes, is located 40, route de ceinture du Lac-Daumesnil in the 12th arrondissement of Paris.

Located near the Metro station: Porte Dorée.

== Gallery ==
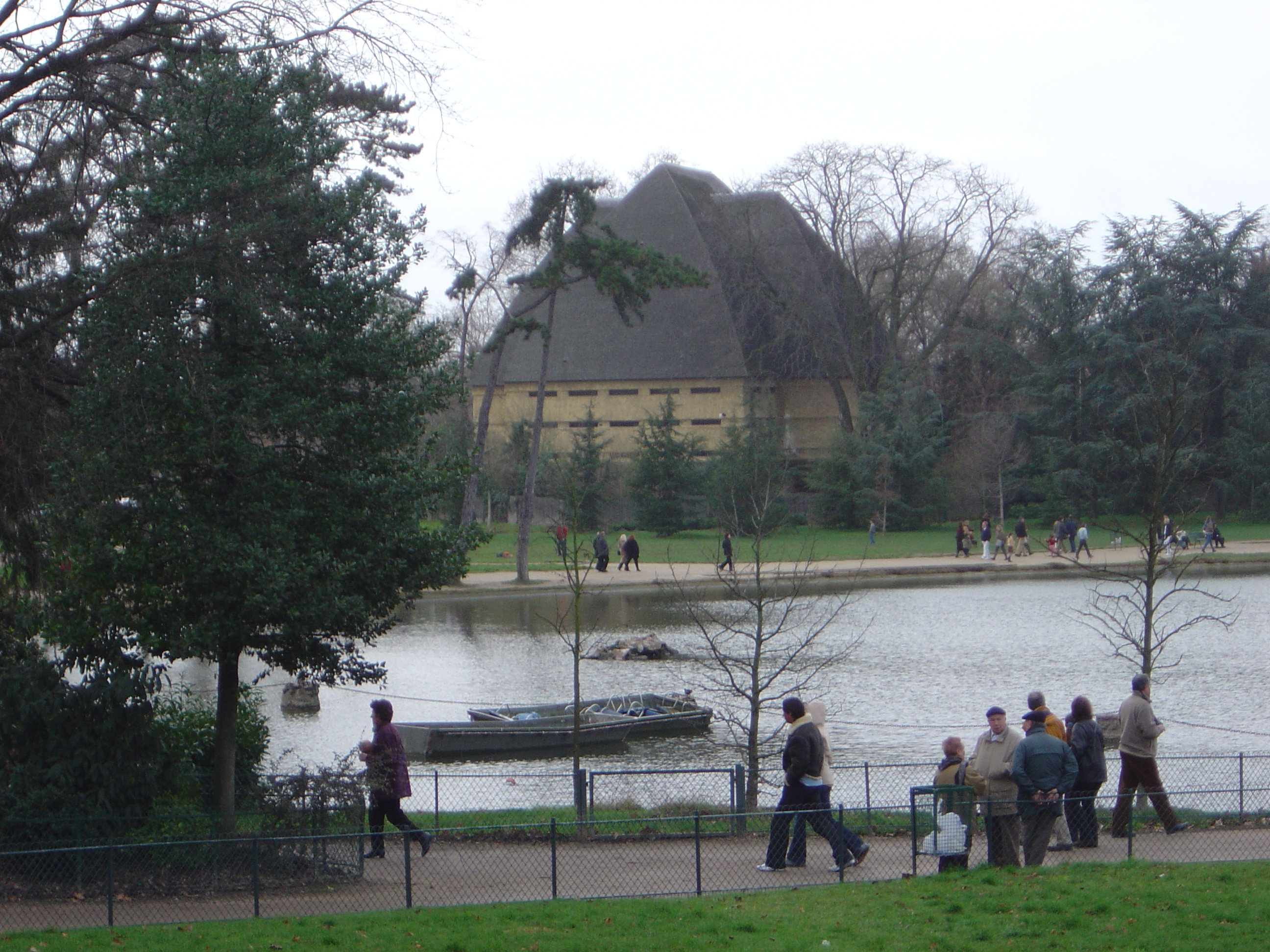
The buddhist temple of the Pagode de Vincennes on the edge of the lac Daumesnil

== See also ==
- Kagyu-Dzong
