= Loy Ehrlich =

French musician, composer and producer

Loy Ehrlich (born 1950) is a French musician, composer and producer based in Paris.

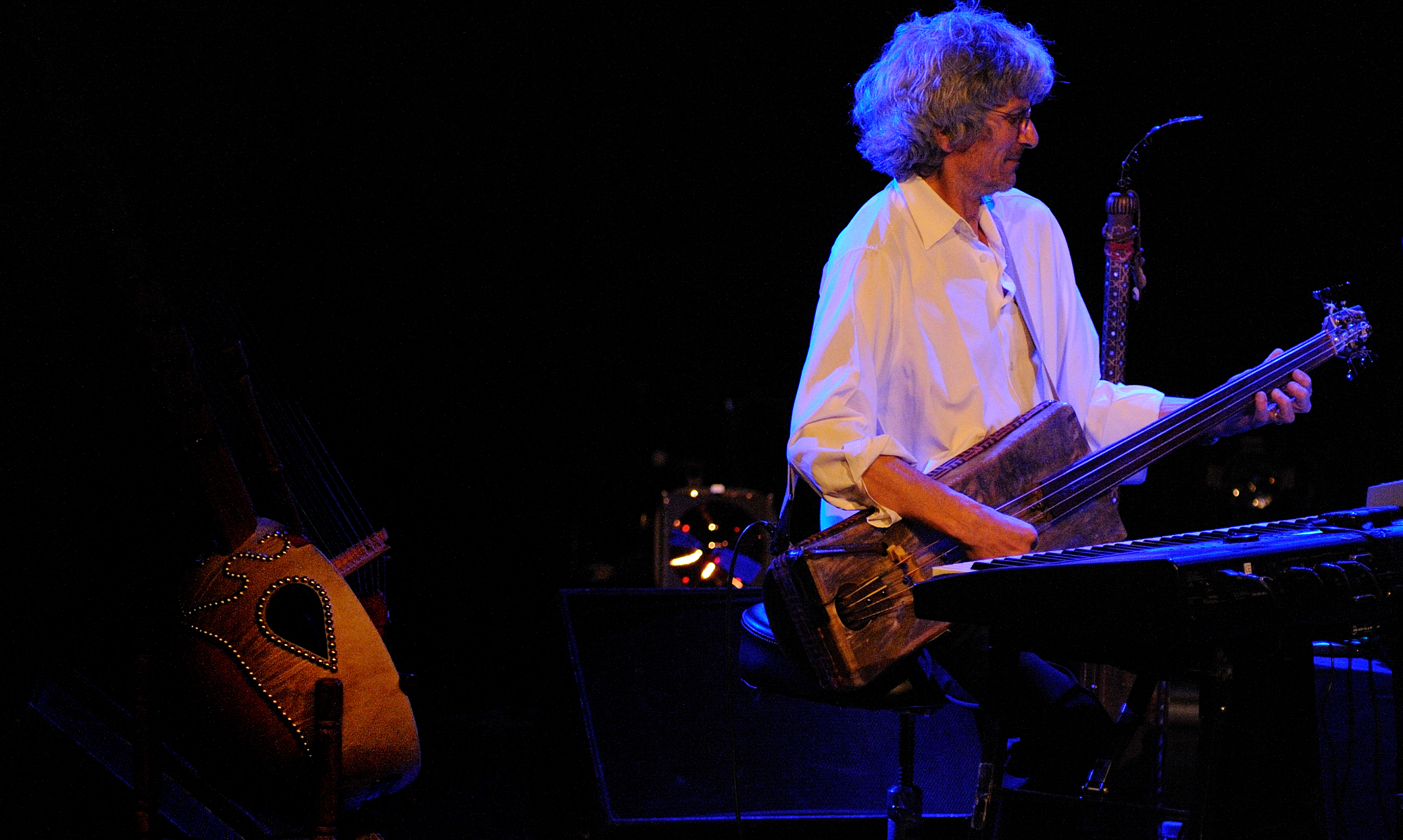
Loy Ehrlich

A multi-instrumentalist, Ehrlich plays keyboards, Bass, Guembri, Gumbass and Kora. He played with major African artists such as Touré Kunda, Youssou N'Dour and Geoffrey Oryema. Member of the Hadouk Trio, he has been the artistic director of the Gnaoua Essaouira festival (Morocco) for 12 years. He invented the musical instrument known as the Gumbass.

The song "Long Road" from his 2014 album Global Traveller was featured in the 2016 video game Uncharted 4: A Thief's End as a record that can be played during the game's epilogue mission.
