= 16th Karmapa, Rangjung Rigpe Dorje =

Tibetan spiritual leader (1924–1981)

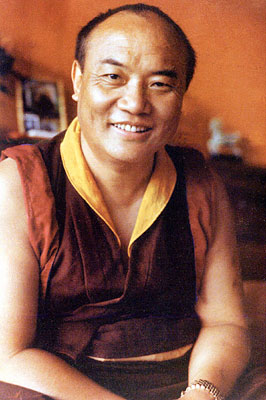
- Title: 16th Gyalwa Karmapa

Personal life
- Born: August 14, 1924 Denkhok, Kingdom of Derge, Kham, Tibet
- Died: November 5, 1981 (aged 57) Zion, Illinois, United States
- Other name: His Holiness Rangjung Rigpei Dorje

Religious life
- Religion: Tibetan Buddhism
- School: Karma Kagyu

Senior posting
- Predecessor: Khakyab Dorje
- Successor: Ogyen Trinley Dorje^{Co-claimant along with Trinley Thaye Dorje}
- Reincarnation: Gyalwa Karmapa

The 16th Karmapa, Rangjung Rigpe Dorje (Tibetan: རང་འབྱུང་རིག་པའི་རྡོ་རྗེ་, Wylie: Rang 'byung rig pa'i rdo rje; August 14, 1924 – November 5, 1981) was the 16th Gyalwa Karmapa and the spiritual leader of the Karma Kagyu lineage of Tibetan Buddhism. He is of the oldest line of reincarnate lamas in Vajrayana Buddhism, known as the Karmapas whose coming was predicted by the Buddha in the Samadhiraja Sutra. The 16th Karmapa was considered to be a "living Buddha" and was deeply involved in the transmission of Tibetan Vajrayana Buddhism to Europe and North America following the Chinese invasion of Tibet. He was known as the "King of the Yogis", and is the subject of numerous books and films.

== Biography ==
=== Birth ===
The 16th Karmapa was born in Denkhok in the Kingdom of Derge in Kham eastern Tibet near the Dri Chu River (Ch. Yangtze). The previous Karmapa Khakyab Dorje (1871-1922) left a letter setting forth the circumstances of his next incarnation. The 15th Karmapa's close attendant, Jampal Tsultrim, possessed the letter of prediction, which matched exactly with the process the 11th Tai Situpa was already undertaking to find the 16th Karmapa, Rangjung Rigpe Dorje.

=== Recognition as Karmapa ===
Political obstacles arose in the recognition process of the 16th Karmapa, due to the delay of the prediction letter's arrival in Lhasa. Before Jampal Tsultrim could send a copy of the letter to the 13th Dalai Lama's government in Lhasa, a Lhasa Ministry issued a formal statement that the Karmapa’s reincarnation had been born in Lhasa as the son of one of its cabinet ministers, Lungshawa. Lungshawa wanted his son to be named as the Karmapa as part of his plan to modernize Tibet. The Karmapa's Labrang, where the Tsurphu Monastery's administration was located, appealed the decision saying that they had an authentic prediction letter. The Ministry replied that the Dalai Lama had issued a position, which couldn't be changed. The petitioning went back and forth for a year until Lungshawa's son fell from a roof, broke his pelvis and died from ensuing complications. The Tsurphu Monastery re-submitted the Karmapa's name but were again rebuffed by the Ministry, since submitting a single name was equivalent to the Tsurphu Monastery choosing the tulku. The 1st Beru Khyentse Rinpoche came up with a plan to submit the Karmapa's name twice - once as the son of the father, and a second time as the son of the mother. The Ministry responded by saying the correct tulku was the mother's son, not the father's son.

=== Early life and first Black Crown Ceremony ===
He was taken to the Palpung Monastery where the 11th Tai Situpa, Pema Wangchok, gave him ordination, the Bodhisattva vows and many teachings. Beru Khyentse Lodro Miza Pampa'i Gocha taught him the tantras. Bo Kangkar Rinpoche taught him the sutras. Jamgon Palden Kyentse Oser taught him Mahamudra and the Six Yogas of Naropa. He regarded the 11th Tai Situpa, Pema Wangchok, and the 2nd Jamgön Kongtrül Khyentse Öser as his root gurus. In 1931, at the age of seven, he performed his first Black Crown ceremony. He received his hair cutting ceremony at age thirteen from Thubten Gyatso, 13th Dalai Lama.

=== Education and Receiving Important Transmissions ===
During his education, he received all the Kagyu transmissions and was also taught by the Sakya Trizin for many years. In the beginning of 1940, he went into retreat, and in 1947, started a pilgrimage to India, before another one in 1956 together with Tenzin Gyatso, the 14th Dalai Lama. Rangjung continued his education with the 10th Mindrolling Trichen of the Nyingma School and it was concluded with the Kalachakra initiation of the Gelugpa School. Rangjung had therefore received all the major teachings of all the major Tibetan Buddhist schools.

=== Teaching Activity ===
The 16th Karmapa continued his predecessor's activities, travelling and teaching throughout Tibet, Bhutan, Nepal, Sikkim, India and parts of China. His activity also included locating the rebirths of high reincarnate lamas spontaneously, without meditation.

=== Premonitions of Chinese Occupation and Escape from Tibet ===
Prior to the Chinese invasion of Tibet the Karmapa made a series of predictions indicating that the Tibetan people would need to be prepared to escape to India. In 1940, at age 16, Karmapa composed a poem that predicted the occupation of Tibet.:

Our people shall not stay here. We will go to India.

The cuckoo bird called by the host of spring knows where to go when seeds mature in autumn's bloom.

I am not thinking of going anywhere else but to eastern India.

As political circumstances altered Tibet radically with the 1950 takeover by China. The Karmapa, along with the Dalai Lama, government officials, and other high lamas, attended talks in Beijing to negotiate a settlement. This succeeded for a while, but in 1959 the Chinese government insisted on land reform, which would undermine the system of independent monasteries in Tibetan Buddhism. Conflict with the lamas as spiritual leaders accelerated.

In February of that year Karmapa took 160 students from Tsurphu Monastery and escaped to Bhutan, taking the lineage's most sacred treasures and relics with them.

Tashi Namgyal, the King of Sikkim, offered the Karmapa the site where the 9th Karmapa had previously established one of three Sikkim monasteries, which was then in ruins. It was here that the 16th Karmapa's seat-in-exile, Rumtek Monastery, was built then officially inaugurated in 1966. The traditional Tibetan seat of the Karmapa, Tsurphu Monastery, from where the Karmapa Ogyen Trinley Dorje escaped in 1999, still exists while the number of monks is restricted by the Chinese government.

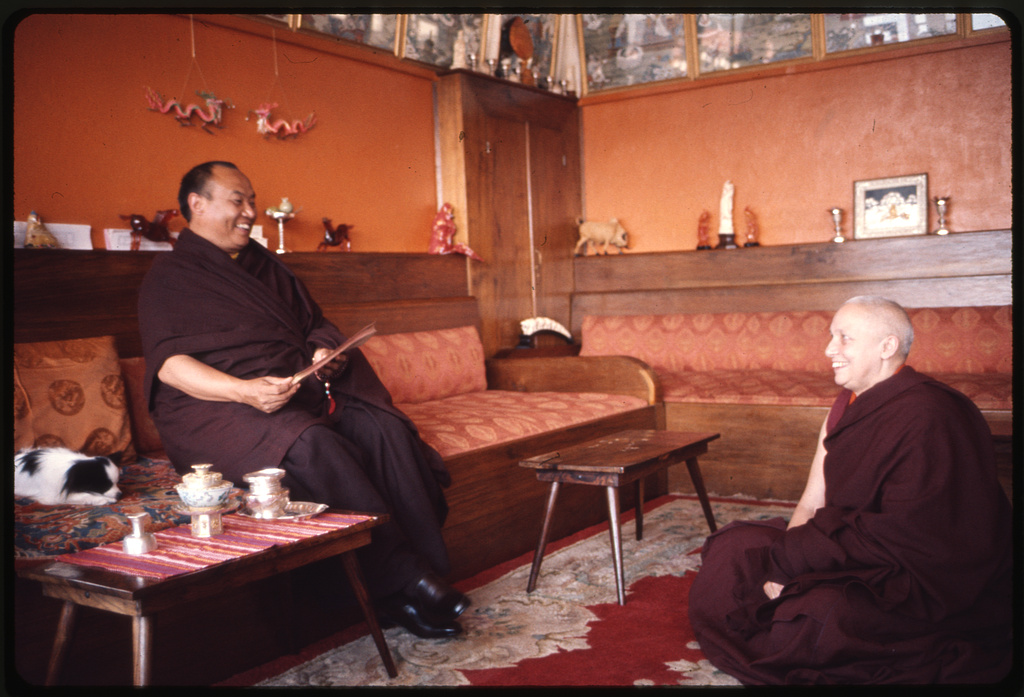
Rangjung Rigpe Dorje, the 16th Karmapa, seated, with Freda Bedi at Rumtek Monastery, Sikkim, 1971

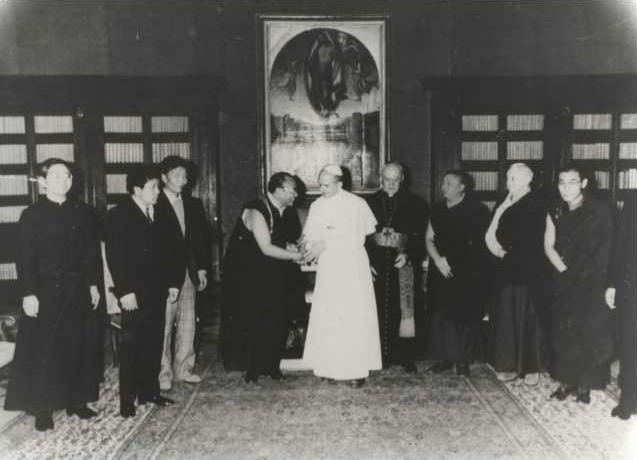
Rangjung Rigpe Dorje, the 16th Karmapa with Pope Paul VI, January 17, 1975.

=== Focus on the West ===
In the beginning of the 1970s the Karmapa made the prediction that Tibet would have a hard struggle gaining independence and even if it did, it would not allow the refugees to return. Rumtek would not be a good place either, and although Sikkim and Bhutan are still stable, they can deteriorate as well. However the Western world will embrace Buddhism, so he sent Lama Gendün to Europe.

In 1974, with the help of Freda Bedi, he embarked on his first world tour. On September 15, The Karmapa left Rumtek with an entourage of Tulkus and monks, including Tenga Rinpoche, Bardor Tulku Rinpoche and Lama Jigme Rinpoche. He was welcomed in London September 17, by Chime Rinpoche, Akong Rinpoche and others, including Hannah Nydahl and Lama Ole Nydahl. The Karmapa traveled to Europe, Canada and the United States, where he was welcomed by Chögyam Trungpa. In October 1974 The Karmapa visited the Second Mesa, Hopi reservation in Arizona. He established Dhagpo Kagyu Ling in France as the central seat of activity, gave several Black Crown ceremonies, and attended an audience granted by Pope Paul VI. In 1976-77 he began a more exhaustive tour, giving extensive teachings, visiting nearly every major city in Europe.

In May 1980, Karmapa again visited the West, stopping for lectures and ceremonies in London, New York, San Francisco, Santa Cruz, Boulder, and Santa Fe.

The sixteenth Karmapa helped foster the transmission of Tibetan Buddhism to the West. He established Dharma centers and monasteries in various places around the world in order to protect, preserve, and spread Buddha's teachings. As part of an initiative by the Tibetan government-in-exile to consolidate the organizations of Tibetan Buddhism, Rangjung Rigpe Dorje became the first formal head of the Kagyu School, although the earlier Karmapas had long been considered the most prestigious and authoritative lamas of that school.

=== Miracles ===
There are several accounts of miracles performed by the 16th Karmapa, which is in keeping with many Buddhist masters that came before him.

==== Childhood ====
The Karmapa's identity as a child was kept secret, but nearby villagers noticed auspicious signs at his birth and came to him for blessings. As a child the Karmapa exhibited clairvoyant abilities, and if local peasants lost a sheep or another animal from their flock he knew where their animals were.

==== Birds ====
Karmapa, who was fond of birds, was said to bless them upon their death. Instead of keeling over they would remain completely stiff and remain upwards for several days. It was understood that the birds were in a state of samadhi, and this process was known as "liberation through contact".

==== Hopi tribe and relieving drought ====
In 1974 the Karmapa visited the Hopi tribe in New Mexico, who had requested him to relieve their drought-stricken land. He conducted a ceremony, and a deluge of rain fell for the first time in seventy-five days. In the evening, Hopi and Navajo people were granted the empowerment of Red Chenrezig.

=== Death ===
In 1980-81 the Karmapa began his last world tour, giving teachings, interviews and empowerments in South East Asia, Greece, Great Britain, Canada and the United States. Rangjung Rigpei Dorjé died on November 5, 1981, in the United States in a hospital in Zion, Illinois, just north of Chicago. Doctors and nurses at the hospital remarked on his kindness and how he seemed more concerned with their welfare than his own.

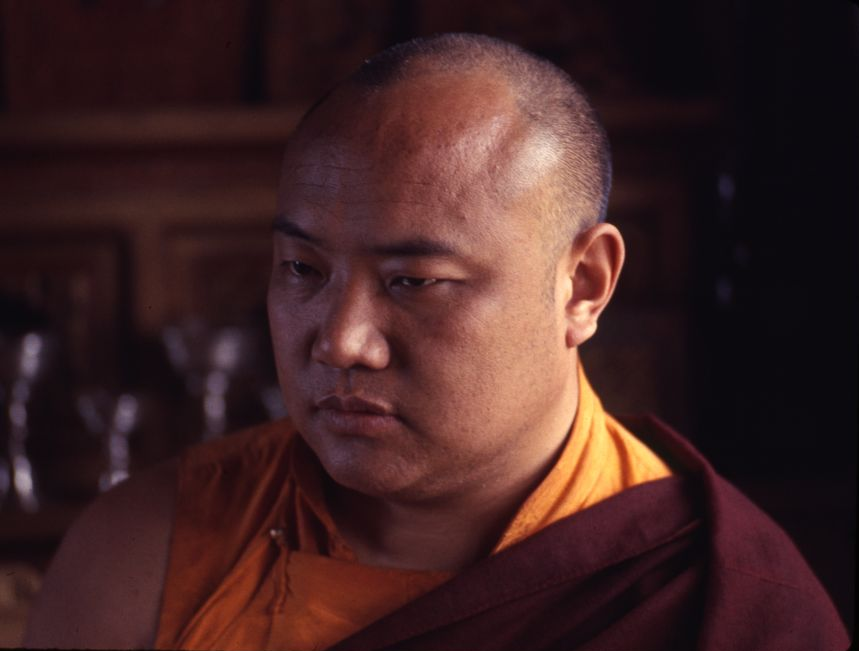
1965 photo of Karmapa in Sikkim by Dr. Alice S. Kandell

According to buddhism-affiliated sources, one doctor was also struck by the Karmapa's refusal of pain medication and the absence of any signs of feeling the profound pain that most patients in his condition report. Upon his death, against hospital procedure but in keeping with Tibetan tradition and with special permission from the State of Illinois, his body was left in the hospital for three days.

His body was cremated at Rumtek, also according to Tibetan tradition.

== Legacy ==
Like his predecessors, he was primarily a spiritual figure and therefore not involved in politics. He instead made efforts to keep the spiritual traditions of Tibet intact and in this way helped to preserve the identity of Tibet as a unique and individual culture.

Rangjung Rigpe Dorje, as with all other Karmapas and tulkus, is accepted by Tibetan Buddhists as a manifestation of an enlightened being.

== Notes ==
Buddhist titles
| Preceded by Khakyab Dorje | Reincarnation of the Karmapa | Succeeded by Disputed: between Ogyen Trinley Dorje and Trinley Thaye Dorje |
