= Aubry-le-Panthou =

- Commune
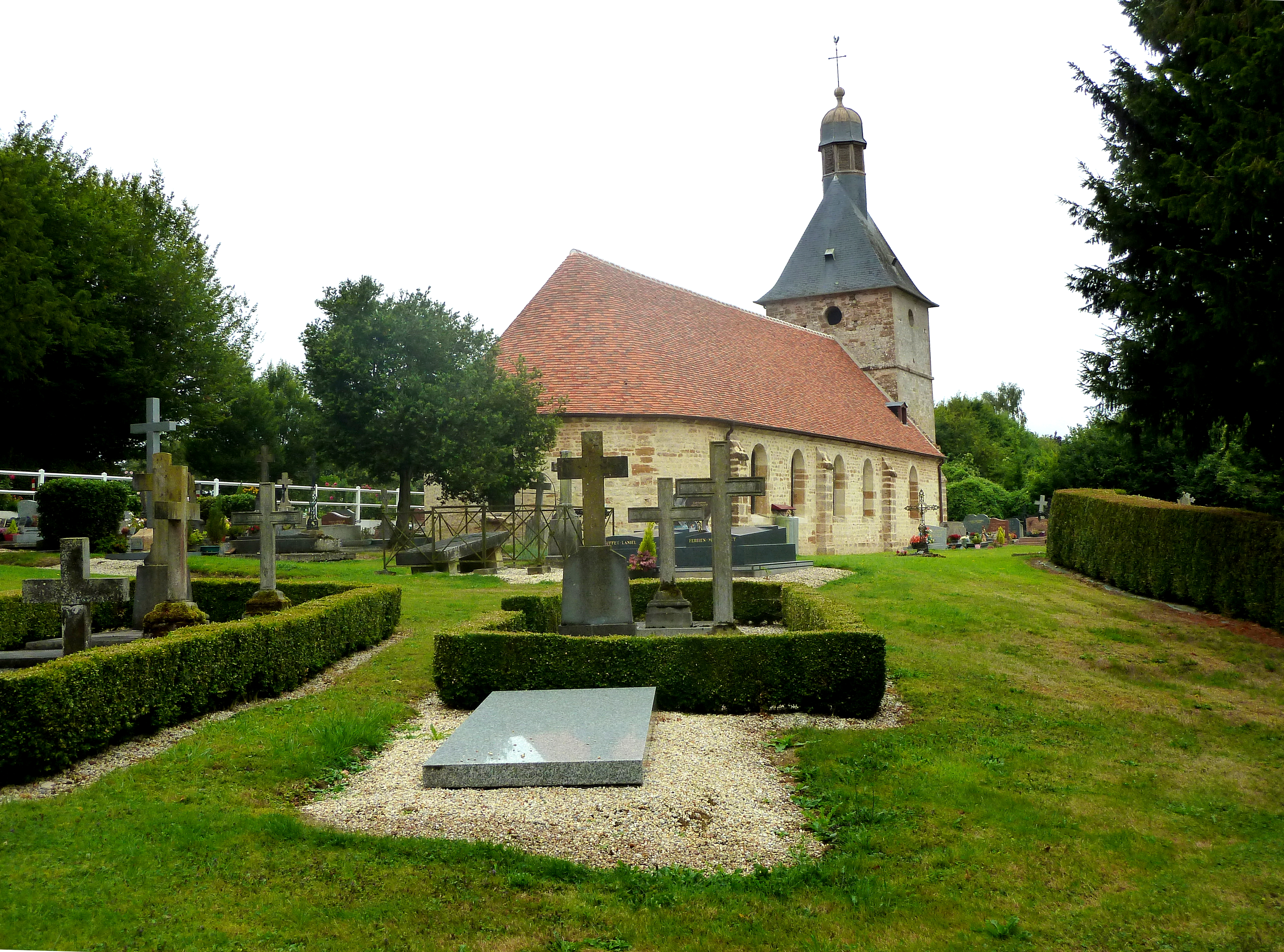
- The church in Aubry-le-Panthou
- Location of Aubry-le-Panthou
- Location within France Location within Normandy
- Coordinates: 48°51′05″N 0°14′01″E
- Country: France
- Region: Normandy
- Department: Orne
- Arrondissement: Mortagne-au-Perche
- Canton: Vimoutiers
- Intercommunality: CC Vallées Auge Merlerault

Government
  - Mayor (2020–2026): Jean-Claude Laigre
- Area^{1}: 6.85 km^{2} (2.64 sq mi)
- Elevation: 172 m (564 ft)
- Highest elevation: 256 m (840 ft)
- Lowest elevation: 133 m (436 ft)
- Population (2023): 133
  - Density: 19.4/km^{2} (50.3/sq mi)
- Time zone: UTC+01:00 (CET)
  - Summer (DST): UTC+02:00 (CEST)
- INSEE/Postal code: 61010 /61120
- ^{1} French Land Register data, which excludes lakes, ponds, glaciers > 1 km^{2} (0.386 sq mi or 247 acres) and river estuaries.

Aubry-le-Panthou (French pronunciation: [obʁi lə pɑ̃tu]) is a commune in the Orne department in north-western France.

== Geography ==
The commune along with another 11 communes is part of a 1,400 hectare, Natura 2000 conservation area, called the Haute Vallée de la Touques et affluents.

The River Vie runs through the commune in addition to two streams, the Val Roger & the Mont-Ormel.

== Population ==
Historical population
Year	Pop.	±% p.a.
1968	207	—
1975	121	−7.38%
1982	89	−4.29%
1990	106	+2.21%
1999	93	−1.44%
2007	98	+0.66%
2012	107	+1.77%
2017	115	+1.45%
2023	133	+2.45%
Source: INSEE

== Points of Interest ==
- Coteau des Champs-Genêts is a 29 hectare Sensitive Natural Space of Orne. The reserve features the following fauna and flora Camargue horses, Boloria dia, Adonis blue, Vincetoxicum hirundinaria, Dactylorhiza viridis and Gentiana cruciata.
- Vajradhara-Ling is a Buddhist centre based in the commune since 1982.
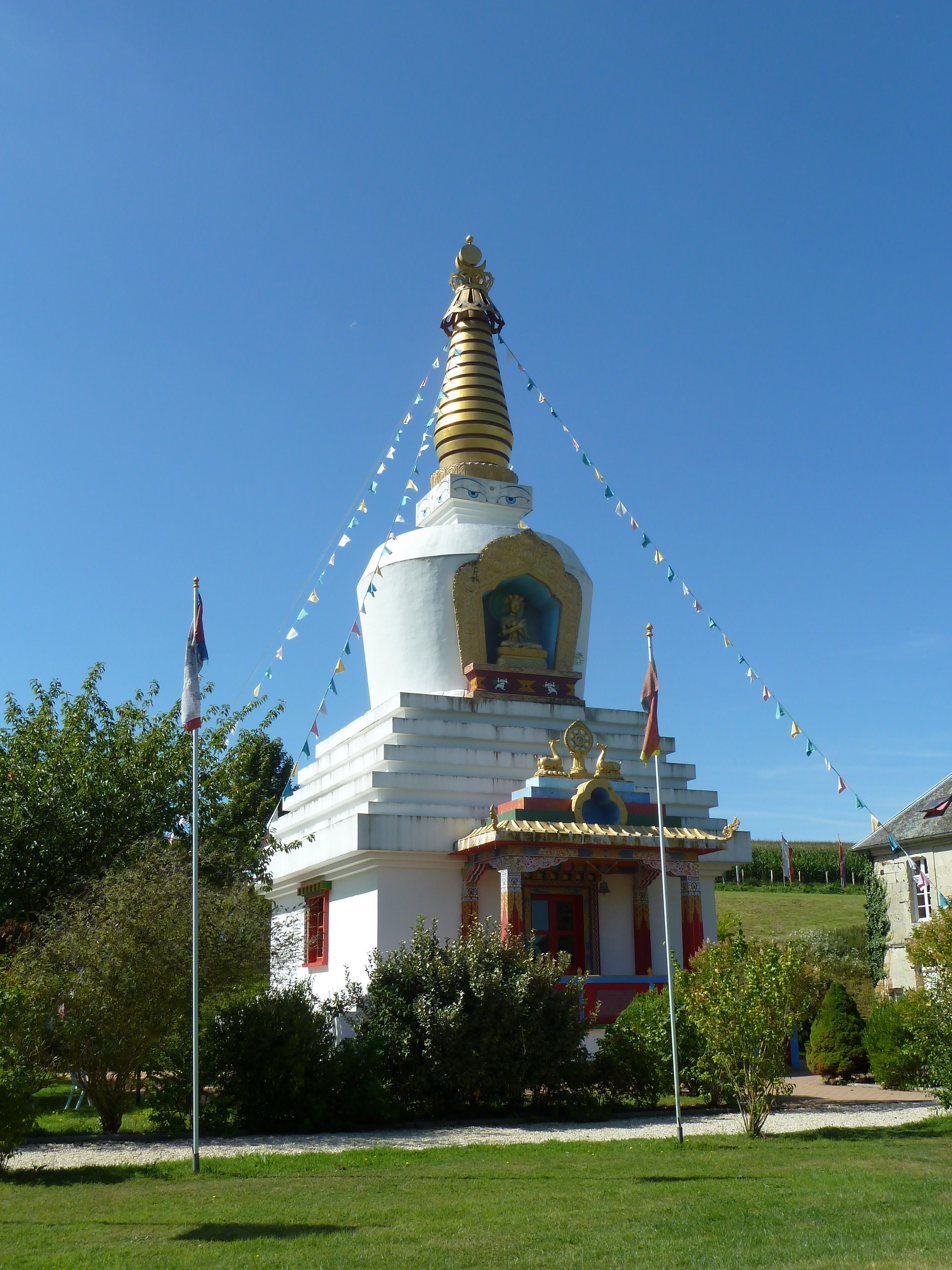
Vajradhara-Ling

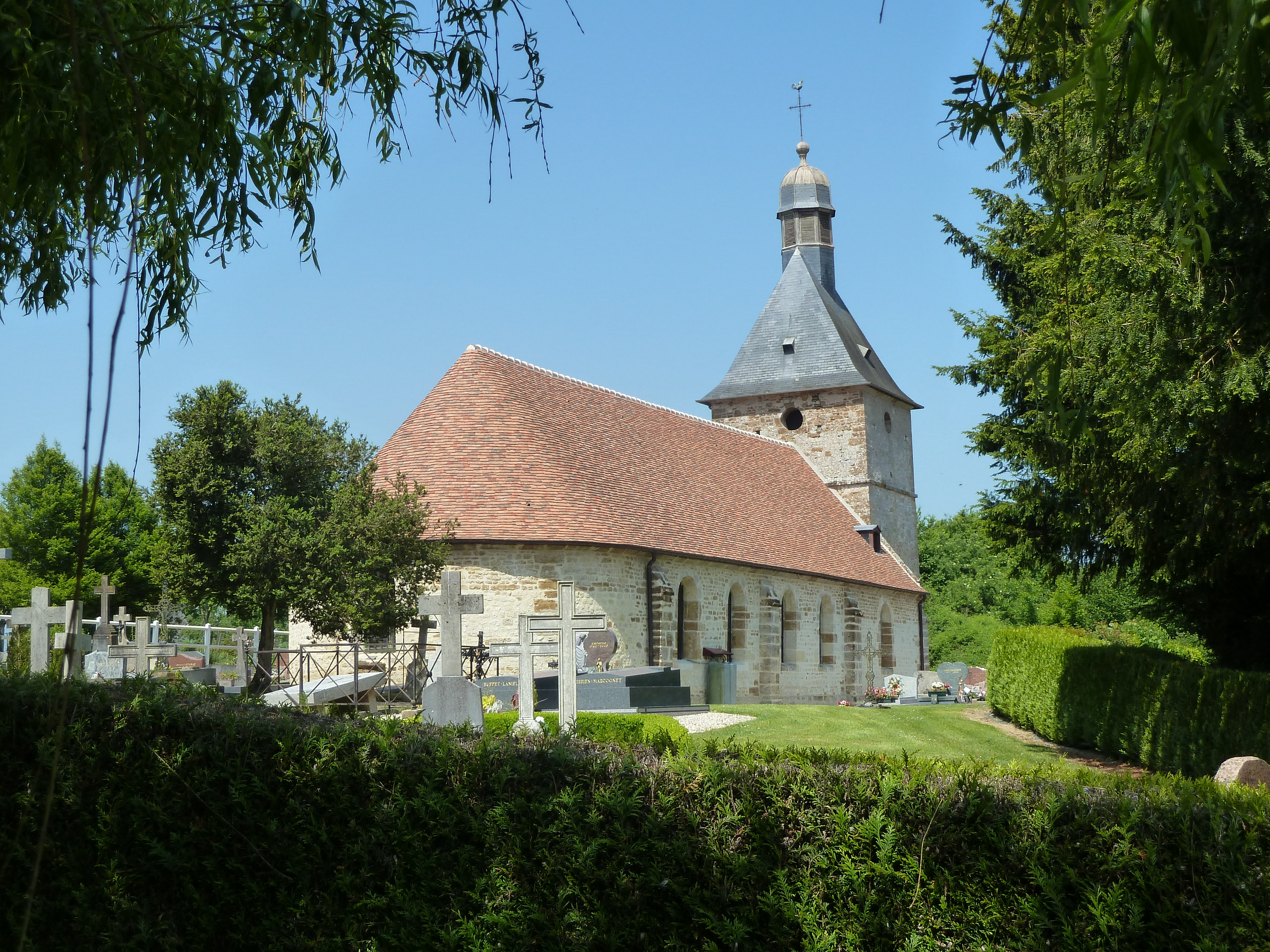
Aubry-le-Panthou Church

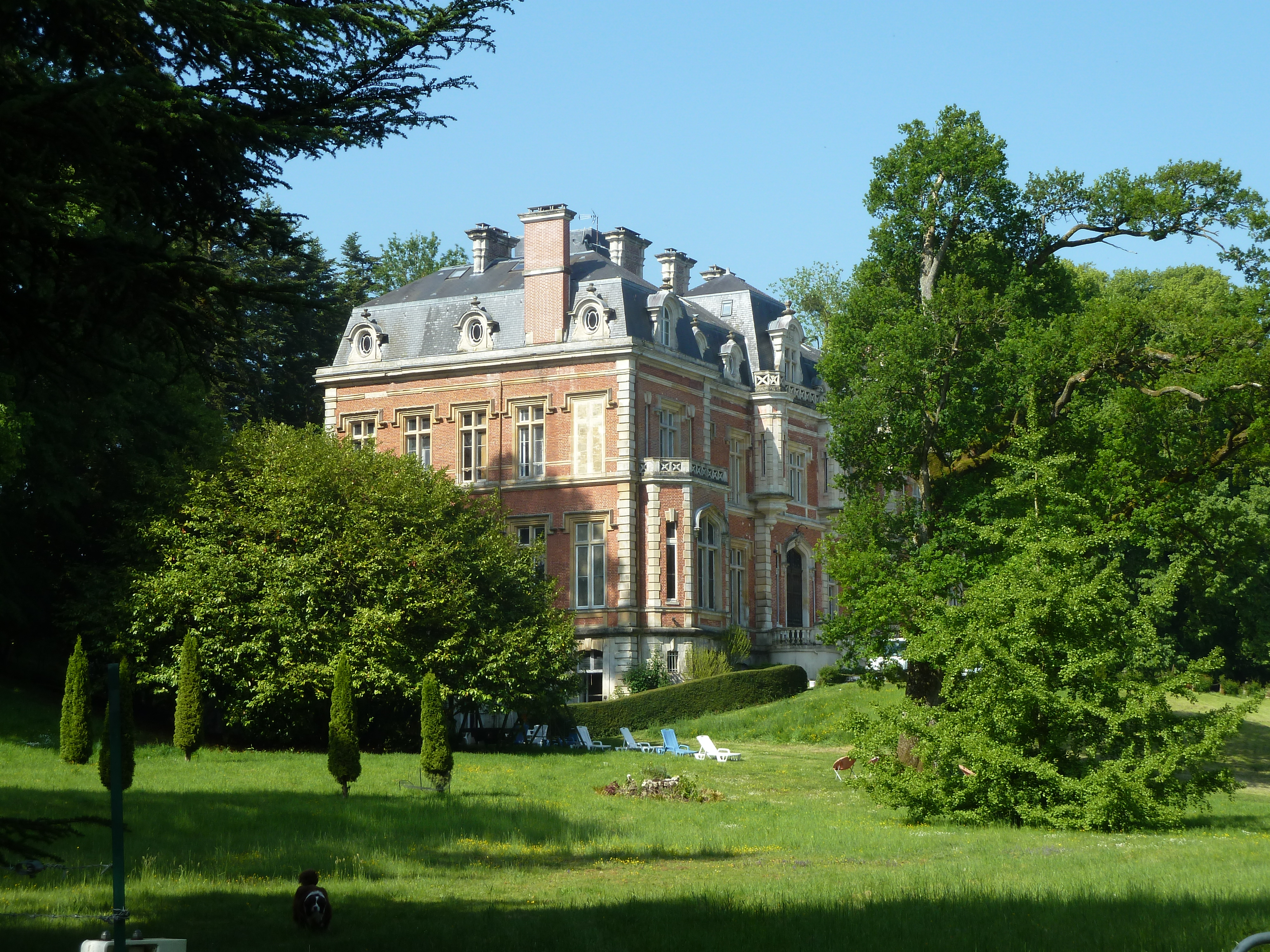
Castle of Osmont

== See also ==
- Communes of the Orne department
