= Ogyen Trinley Dorje =

Claimant to the title of 17th Karmapa

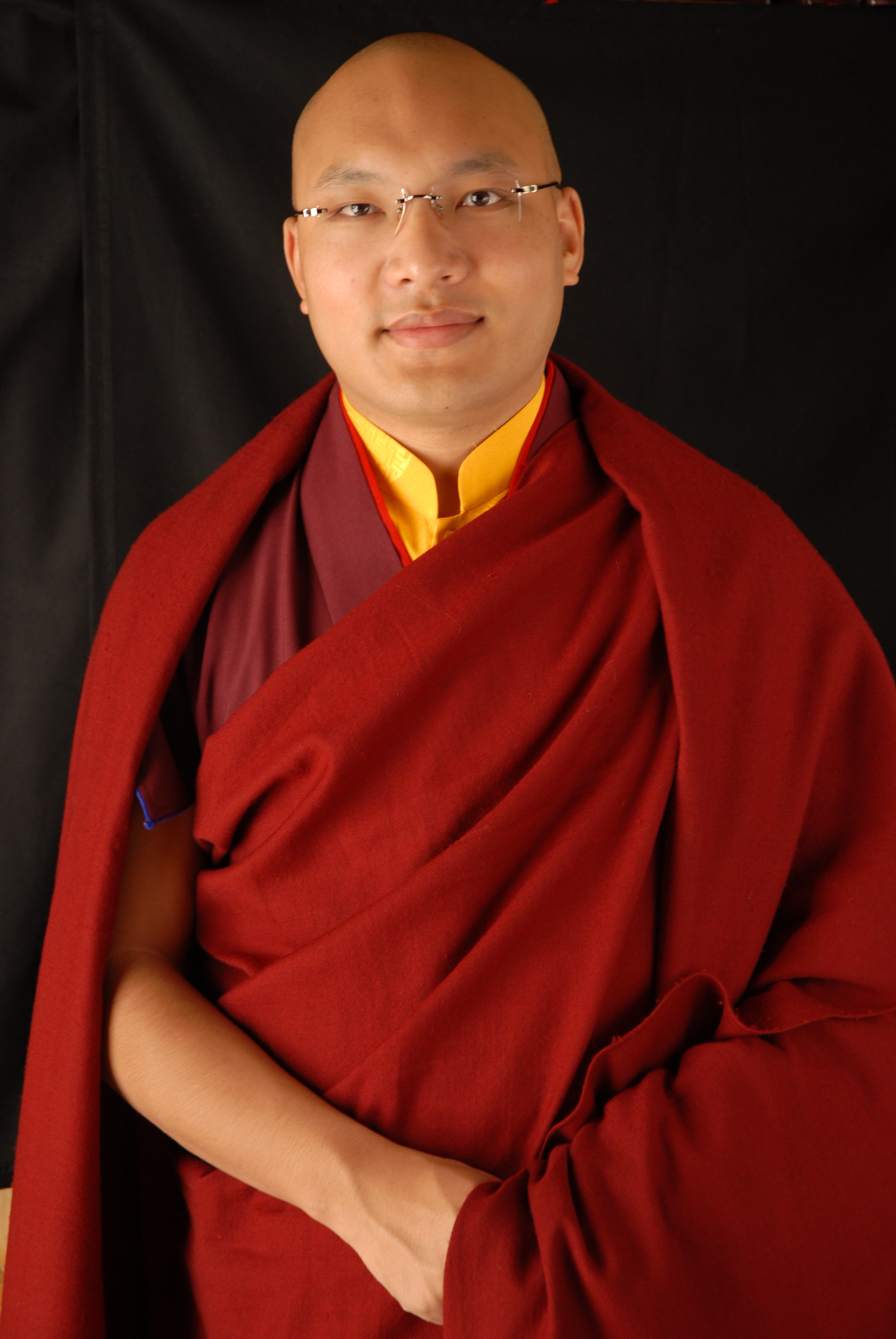
- Title: His Holiness; 17th Karmapa ^{Co-claimant along with Thaye Dorje}

Personal life
- Born: Apo Gaga (Happy Brother); 19 June 1985 (age 41) Chamdo County, Tibet, China
- Website: KagyuOffice.org

Religious life
- Religion: Tibetan Buddhism
- Denomination: Vajrayana
- School: Karma Kagyu ^{a.k.a. Kamsang Kagyu}
- Lineage: Karma Kagyu
- Dharma name: Ogyen Drodul Trinley Dorje

Senior posting
- Predecessor: Rangjung Rigpe Dorje
- Reincarnation: Karmapa^{Co-claimant along with Trinley Thaye Dorje}

Ogyen Trinley Dorje (Tibetan: ཨོ་རྒྱན་འཕྲིན་ལས་རྡོ་རྗེ།, Wylie: O-rgyan 'Phrin-las Rdo-rje, Chinese: 鄔金欽列多傑; born 26 June 1985), also written as Urgyen Trinley Dorje (Wylie: U-rgyan 'Phrin-las Rdo-rje) is a claimant to the title of 17th Karmapa.

The Karmapa is head of the Karma Kagyu school, one of the four main schools of Tibetan Buddhism. Ogyen Trinley Dorje and Thaye Dorje are the persisting claimants to that office and title.

== Biography ==
Ogyen Trinley Rinpoche was born Apo Gaga in 1985 in Lhatok Township, Chamdo County, Tibet Autonomous Region, to nomadic parents.

The 14th Dalai Lama issued an official statement of recognition and confirmation of the 16th Karmapa's reincarnation as Ogyen Trinley Dorje, on 30 June 1992. He was enthroned as the 17th Karmapa on 27 September 1992 at Tsurphu Monastery (Wylie: Mtshur-phu), the traditional seat of the Karmapa in Tibet, and there he began his Tibetan and Buddhist studies.

Ogyen Trinley Dorje received the official sanction of the State Council of the People's Republic of China on 29 June 1992, who declared him to be a "living Buddha", the first time the People's Republic of China has officially confirmed a tulku. A year later, the Chinese announced during the UN World Conference on Human Rights in Vienna they would train him in Tsurphu for his future task as the successor of the Dalai Lama.

=== Escape from Tibet ===
In 1999, at the age of 14, the Karmapa escaped Chinese-controlled Tibet during the winter, traveling to India through Nepal, arriving at the Tibetan exile quarters at McLeod Ganj on 5 January 2000. Ogyen Trinley Dorje stated he was unable to obtain in China the specialized instruction he needed to complete his studies and to realize his full spiritual authority. He has resided at Gyuto Monastery in Sidhbari, near Dharamshala up to 2017.

=== Travel through the United States and Europe ===
From May 15-June 2, 2008, the Karmapa made his first trip to the US, visiting New York City, Boulder, Colorado, and Seattle and was formally enthroned in the North American seat of the Gyalwang Karmapa at Karma Triyana Dharmachakra monastery in Woodstock, New York. He gave multiple teachings on compassion and the environment, gave the reading transmission for a new form of ngöndro, and bestowed several empowerments, including those of Avalokiteśvara and Padmasambhava. He also spoke about the special challenges of the rapid pace of modern society, and the virtues of the Internet as a tool for the study and practice of Buddhism. Ogyen Trinley Dorje Visited the United States again in 2011, as well as France, Switzerland in 2016 and the United Kingdom in 2017.

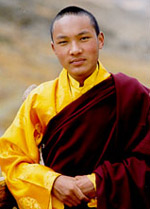
Ogyen Trinley Dorje at age 14

=== Residing in US and becoming citizen of a Caribbean nation ===
As of October 2018, Ogyen Trinley Dorje was residing in the United States and had been outside of India continuously since May 2017. In 2018, to facilitate travel abroad, he became a citizen of the Caribbean nation Dominica through a provision widely used which allows citizenship through investment.

== Tibetan culture, unity, language and literacy ==
For many years Ogyen Trinley Dorje has emphasized the importance of preserving Tibetan culture, unity, language, and literacy; underlining the importance of sustaining the written and spoken Tibetan language, because it is the very root of the Dharma in Tibet and its culture. Tibetan language is the lifeline that links Tibetans to their culture, arts, and spirituality. Tibetan culture, he states, is the mind and life force of the Tibetan people.

=== Dharma digitization ===
Ogyen Trinley Dorje has worked on digitizing Buddhist scriptures and commentaries in order to expand access to students, scholars and monasteries.

There are four main websites – Dharma Treasure, Adarsha, Ketaka, and Dharma Ebooks – each one dealing with a different format, tool, or translation. Adarsha, for example, makes the Kangyur, Tengyur, and Tibetan masterpieces available in digital format and has been catalogued under the guidance of Ogyen Trinley Dorje.

=== 108 Translations ===
108 Translations was initiated in 2015 by Ogyen Trinley Dorje in order to produce a needed body of reading material that can promote the reinvigoration of Tibetan language. Rather than focussing on translating a few famous works that match the interests of a small group of well-educated readers (which has been the case for translations into Tibetan up to the present), 108 Translations aims to provide a plethora of good and easily accessible reading materials for average Tibetan readers. The translations must be easy to understand and pronounce in Tibetan, and the selected works need to meet the interests of the readership.

== Supporting the female Buddhist community ==
Ogyen Trinley Dorje has taken an interest in the welfare of the female Buddhist community, and encouraged equal rights and opportunities for women practitioners. He has, in particular, taken the responsibility to restore full ordination for Tibetan nuns.

== Buddhist vegetarianism ==
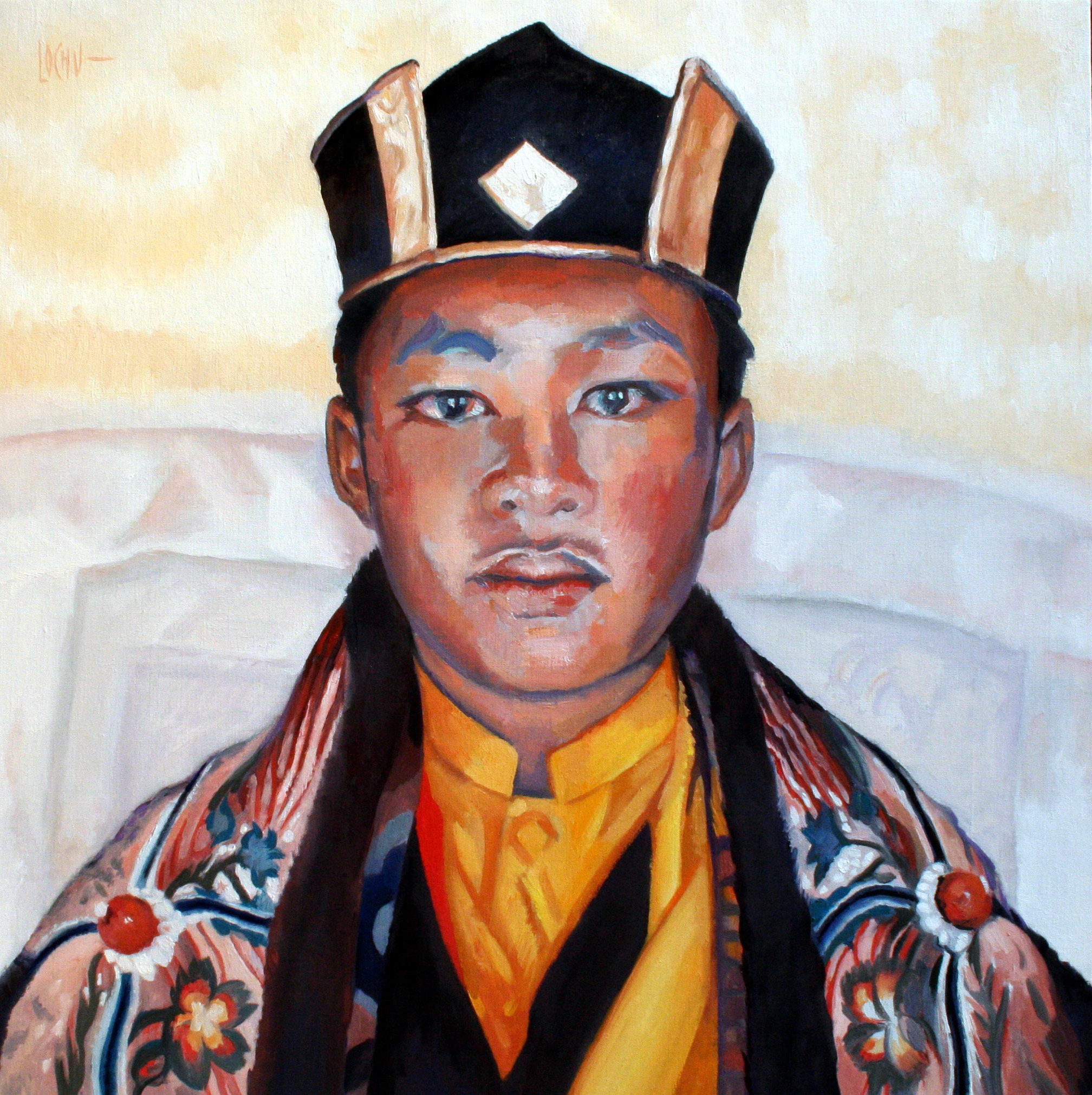
"Gyalwa Karmapa" (Ogyen Trinley Dorje), a portrait by Claude-Max Lochu, exhibition for the project of Temple for Peace in France, 2008

On January 3, 2007, Ogyen Trinley Dorje mandated a purely vegetarian diet in all his monasteries and centers and strongly urged vegetarianism among all his students, saying that generally, in his view, it was very important in the Mahayana not to eat meat and that, even in Vajrayana, it is preferable for students and practitioners not to eat meat.

== Buddhist environmentalism ==
Commenting on the Buddhist tradition of life release, where animals destined for slaughter are bought, blessed and natively released, Karmapa Ogyen Trinley Dorje said the meaning of this concept was broad and that practitioners should use their intelligence to expand the tradition. In 2007 during the Kagyu Monlam Chenmo, he suggested that planting a single tree is more beneficial than performing life release for many beings, and recommended that monasteries should plant one to two thousand trees. In addition, he urged monks to practice restraint when sponsors offer technology upgrades.

On Earth Day, on 22 April 2009, he gave 108 instructions on protecting the environment.

In recent years, Khoryug, a network of Tibetan Buddhist monasteries and centers that work on environmental protection in the Eastern Himalayas, was developed under the auspices of Ogyen Trinley Dorje as part of the World Wildlife Fund's Sacred Earth: Faiths for Conservation program. In his April 2015 interview with Yale Environment 360, he said, "The environmental emergency that we face is not just a scientific issue, nor is it just a political issue, it is also a moral issue. And therefore, all of us approaching this issue have to pick up our share of the responsibility to find and implement solutions. The scientific aspect of it, of course, is the supply of information — the creation of models and predictions and the introduction of techniques that we can use to remedy this. But our share of this responsibility is to take what scientists teach us to heart, so we actually transform our way of life into one that is sustainable.”

== Controversies ==
=== Title Claim ===
Mipham Chokyi Lodro, 14th Shamarpa (the second-longest recognized tulku lineage in the Karma Kagyu tradition, and who in previous incarnations is said to have held and transmitted the Kagyu lineage between Karmapas) did not recognize Ogyen Trinley Dorje as the Karmapa. Shamarpa instead recognized Trinley Thaye Dorje. (Wylie: Mtha'-yas Rdo-rje) Shamarpa's camp argue until the reincarnation line of the Shamarpas was forbidden by the government of the Dalai Lama, the successive Shamarpas were the persons in charge to recognize the Karmapas, whereas the Dalai Lamas played no role in the recognition.

On 10 and 11 Oct 2018, in rural France, Ogyen Trinley Dorje and Trinley Thaye Dorje met in person for the first time and issued a joint statement. On 27 October 2019, Ogyen Trinley Dorje and Trinley Thaye Dorje co-authored a long-life prayer for Kunzig Shamar Rinpoche’s reincarnation. In February 2020, both claimants agreed to recognise the reincarnation of the next Shamar Rinpoche incarnation together.

=== 2011 police raid ===
In January 2011, the Himachal Pradesh Police seized money in currencies of 24 countries including China, valued at over ₹ 60 million, during raids on the offices of a trust backed by Ogyen Trinley Dorje. They also seized several traveler's cheques and land deal documents, suspecting a hawala scam. Initially, the police suspected the money was being used to spread Chinese influence in India, and that the Karmapa was a Chinese agent helping the Chinese government control Buddhist monasteries in India. This allegation was unanimously rejected by all quarters of Tibetan society including the Dalai Lama, the entire Parliament, leaders of the Tibetan government-in-exile and prominent members of the Free Tibet movement.

Himachal Pradesh Police said even if the Karmapa was able to explain the source of the money recovered, he might be held liable for violating the Foreign Exchange Regulation Act. The Karmapa denied all the allegations and said the seized money came via the donations from his followers. A New York Times report on the matter noted an unnamed rival Karmapa candidate has "close ties to Indian intelligence officials". On 11 February 2011, it was reported the central Indian government had cleared the Karmapa of all charges, finding the money in question had been donated by followers.

In April 2011, a statement was released by the Karmapa's Office to address some of the insinuations and fabrications that had been circulating.

In December 2011, the Himachal Pradesh Police filed a chargesheet against Ogyen Trinley Dorje, naming him as an accused in the cash and foreign currency seizure case. The Karmapa's office said Dorje was not involved in the financial administration. Indian police said on Tuesday 24 April 2012 that they had dropped all criminal charges against Ogyen Trinley Dorje. However, in 2015 a judge at the Himachal Pradesh High Court overturned the earlier ruling and began criminal proceedings over the recovery of around US$1 million of foreign currency. His spokesman stated, "He strongly believes truth will prevail at the end". Karmapa, along with nine other accused, was charged on 7 December 2012 and was asked by the court to appear personally on 6 March 2013. He failed to appear as he was out of Dharamsala. All of the accused were as of July 2015 on bail.

=== Sexual assault and family law case filed by Vikki Hui Xin Han ===
After losing contact with Ogyen Trinley Dorje starting January 2019, on July 17, 2019, Vikki Hui Xin Han commenced a family law case seeking child support, a declaration of parentage and a parentage test against Ogyen Trinley Dorje. He was accused of sexually assaulting and impregnating Han when she was a nun-in-training at a New York monastery in 2017, according to the lawsuit.

The woman also alleges that she and Ogyen Trinley Dorje developed a spousal relationship and they planned to live together, though they only met four times. Dorje argues that an intention to live together at some point in the future is not sufficient to show that an existing relationship was marriage-like. The allegations were made public in a ruling by the Supreme Court of British Columbia.

A representative of the Supreme Court was reported to have said of the case "Can a secret relationship that began online and never moved into the physical world be like a marriage? ... Ms. Han's claim is novel. It may even be weak. Almost all of the traditional factors are missing".

On May 17, 2021, an additional spousal support claim against Ogyen Trinley Dorje was added. Reports show Vikki Han gave birth to a child in June 2018. Ogyen Trinley allegedly sent her more than US$700,000 for the purpose of buying a house and a wedding ring. The trial was set to begin on June 7, 2021; though the parties were not prepared to proceed. At a trial management conference on May 6, 2021, the trial was adjourned to April 11, 2022.

In October 2022, Vikki Hui Xin Han voluntarily discontinued the pre-action petition related to this case.

== See also ==
- Karmapa controversy
- Kagyu
- James Parks Morton Interfaith Award

== Notes ==
Buddhist titles
Preceded by Rangjung Rigpe Dorje	Reincarnation of the Karmapa^{Co-claimant along with Thaye Dorje} 1992-present Recognized in 1992	Incumbent
