= Dagpo Kagyu =

Branch of the Kagyu school of Tibetan Buddhism

Dagpo Kagyu (Tibetan: དྭགས་པོ་བཀའ་བརྒྱུད, Wylie: dwags po bka' brgyud) encompasses the branches of the Kagyu school of Tibetan Buddhism that trace their lineage back through Gampopa (1079-1153), who was also known as Dagpo Lhaje (Tibetan: དྭགས་པོ་ལྷ་རྗེ, Wylie: dwags po lha rje) "the Physician from Dagpo" and Nyamed Dakpo Rinpoche "Incomparable Precious One from Dagpo". All the institutional branches of the Kagyu tradition of Tibetan Buddhism surviving today, including the Drikung Kagyu, the Drukpa Lineage and the Karma Kagyu, are branches of the Dagpo Kagyu.

Narrowly, the term Dagpo Kagyu is sometimes used to refer specifically to the lineage of Gampopa's own monastery of Dagla Gampo. This lineage passed from Gampopa to his own nephew Dagpo Gomtsul. Dagpo Tashi Namgyal (1511-1587) was an important lama in this lineage.

== Dagpo Kagyu Lineages ==
Following Gampopa's teachings, there evolved the so-called "Four Primary and Eight Secondary" lineages of the Dagpo Kagyu School.

=== The four primary sub-schools of the Dagpo Kagyu ===
- Tshalpa Kagyu founded by Zhang Yudrakpa Tsöndru Drakpa
- Karma Kagyu or Karma Kamtsang founded by the first Karmapa, Düsum Khyenpa.
- Barom Kagyu founded by Barompa Darma Wangchug
- Phagdru Kagyu founded by Phagmo Drupa Dorje Gyalpo (1110-1170)

=== The eight secondary sub-schools of the Dagpo Kagyu ===
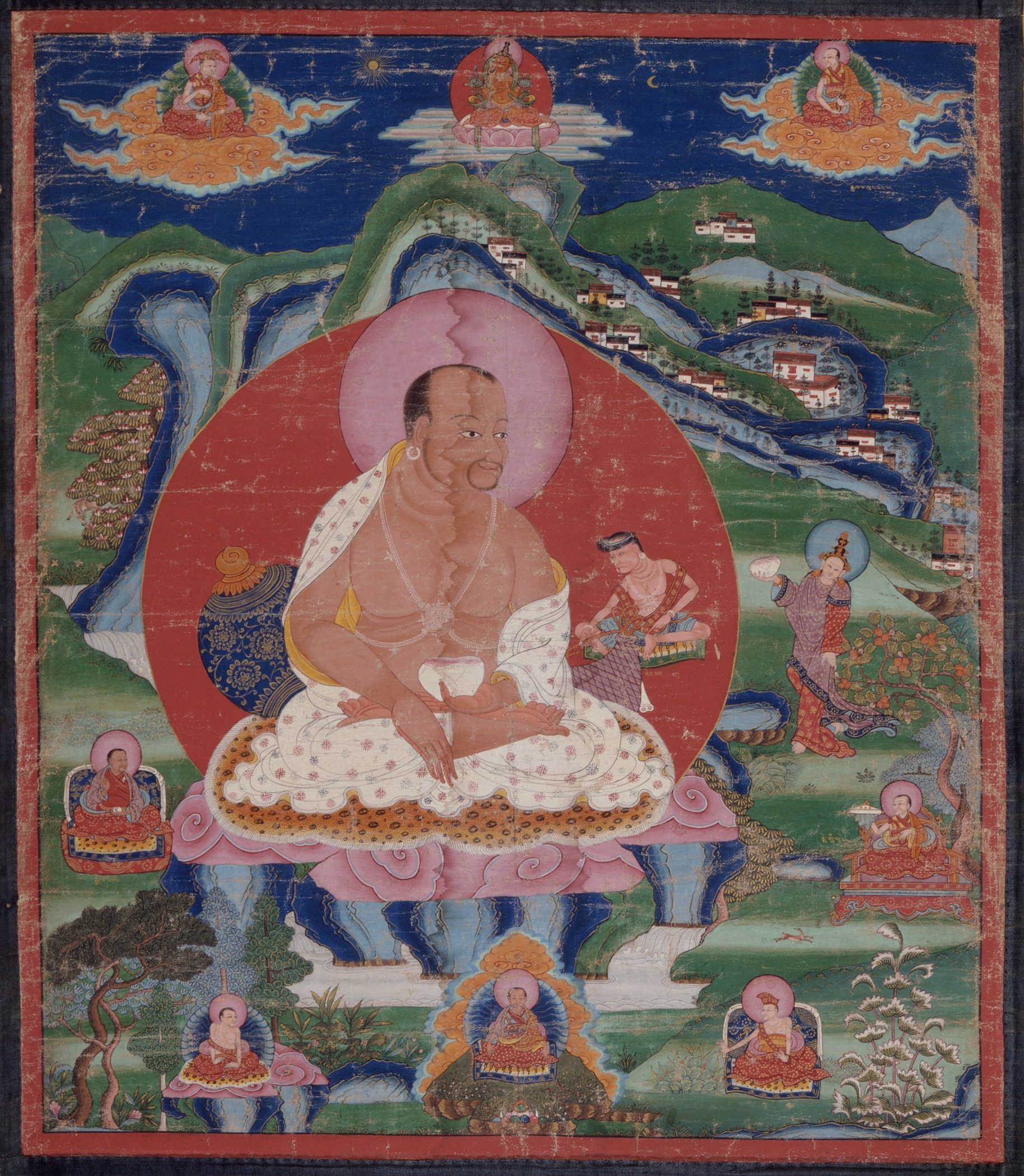
Lingrepa Padma Dorje, founder of the Lingre Kagyu

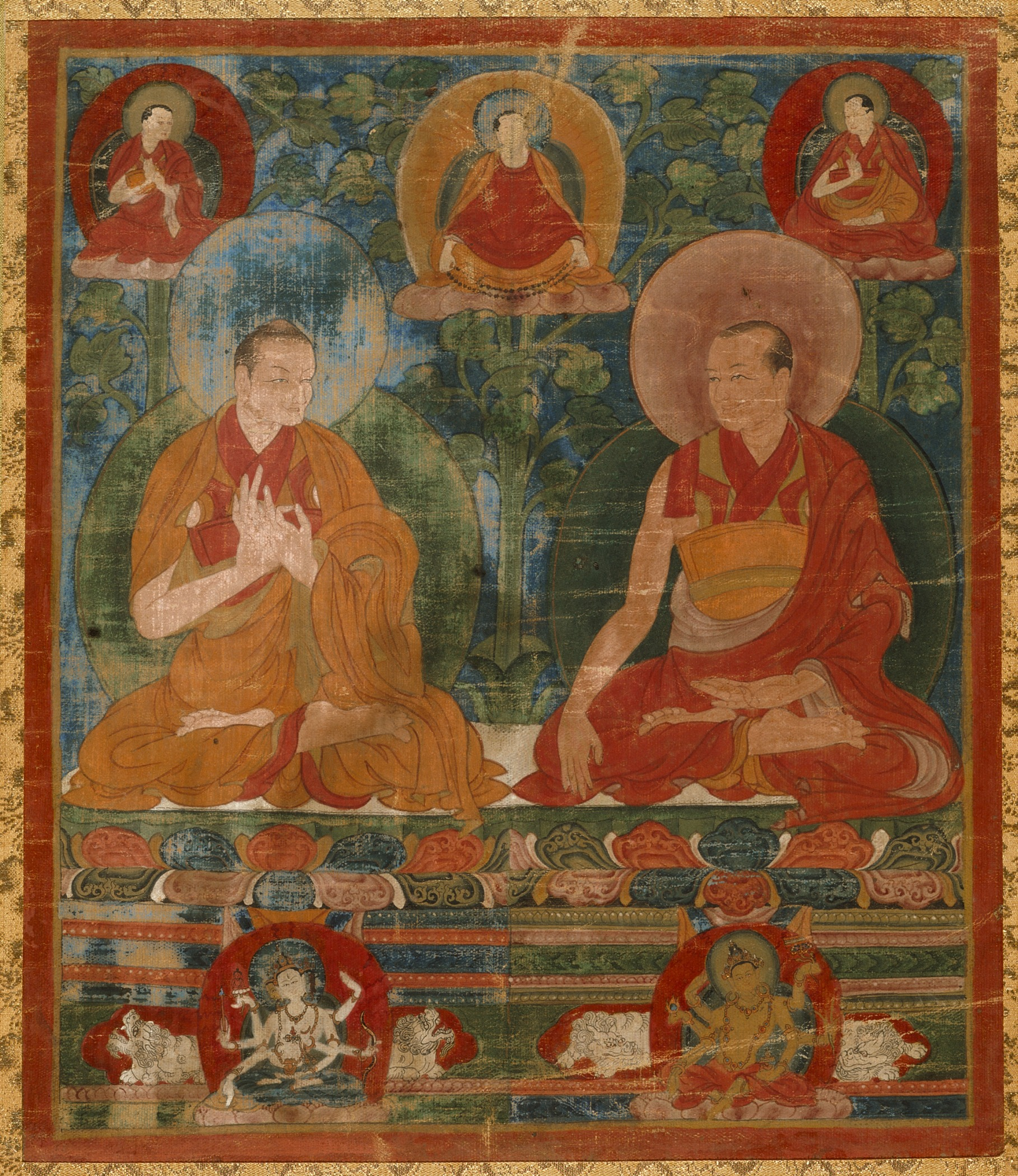
Sakyasri and Thropu Lotsawa, of the Trophu Kagyu

The eight secondary lineages (zung bzhi ya brgyad or chung brgyad) of the Dagpo Kagyu all branched from the Phagdru Kagyu tradition and were founded by senior disciples of Phagmo Drupa Dorje Gyalpo or their immediate successors.

- Drikung Kagyu founded by Drigung Kyobpa Jikten Gönpo Rinchen Päl (1143-1217)
- Lingre Kagyu founded by Lingrepa Pema Dorje (1128-1188)
- Martsang Kagyu founded by Marpa Drupthob Sherab Yeshe who established Sho Monastery (ཤོ་དགོན) in E. Tibet.
- Shugseb Kagyu founded by Gyergom Tsultrim Sengge (1144-1204).
- Taklung Kagyu founded by Taklung Tangpa Tashi Pal (1142-1210).
- Trophu Kagyu established by Gyal Tsha Rinchen Gon (1118-1195) and Kunden Repa (1148-1217). The tradition was developed by their nephew, Thropu Lotsawa.
- Yabzang Kagyu founded by Zarawa Kelden Yeshe Sengge (1168?-1207)
- Yelpa Kagyu was established by Yelpa Yeshe Tsek (1134-1194)

=== The Drukpa Lineage ===
The Drukpa Lineage, often enumerated outside the four primary and eight secondary sub-schools, was founded by Ling Repa's disciple Tsangpa Gyare (1161–1211). His fifth incarnation and eighteenth hereditary lineage holder, Ngawang Namgyal (1594–1651), the 1st Zhabdrung Rinpoche, founded the state of Bhutan and established the Southern Drukpa Lineage as its state religion.

== Dagpo Kagyu Lineages Today ==
The principal Dagpo Kagyu lineages existing today as organized schools are the Karma, Drikung and Drukpa Kagyu. For the most part, the teachings and main esoteric transmissions of the other Dagpo Kagyu lineages have been absorbed into one or another of these three independent schools.

== See also ==
- Index of Buddhism-related articles
- Schools of Buddhism
- Secular Buddhism

== Sources ==
- ཀུན་མཁྱེན་པདྨ་དཀར་པོ། (2005), ཆོས་འབྱུང་བསྟན་བའི་པདྨ་རྒྱས་པའི་ཉིན་བྱེད་ཅེས་བྱ་བ་བཞུགས་སོ།, Thimphu: KMT Publishers
- 'Gos Lo-tsa-ba gZhon-nu-dpal; Roerich, George Nikolaevich (1979), The Blue Annals (reprint of Royal Asiatic Society, Calcutta, 1949 ed.), Delhi: Motilal Banarsidass
- Dorji, Sangay (2008). The Biography of Zhabdrung Ngawang Namgyal: Pal Drukpa Rinpoche. Translated by Sonam Kinga. Thimphu, Bhutan: KMT Publications. ISBN 99936-22-40-0.
