= Taklung Monastery =

Tibetan Buddhist monastery near Lhasa, Tibet, China

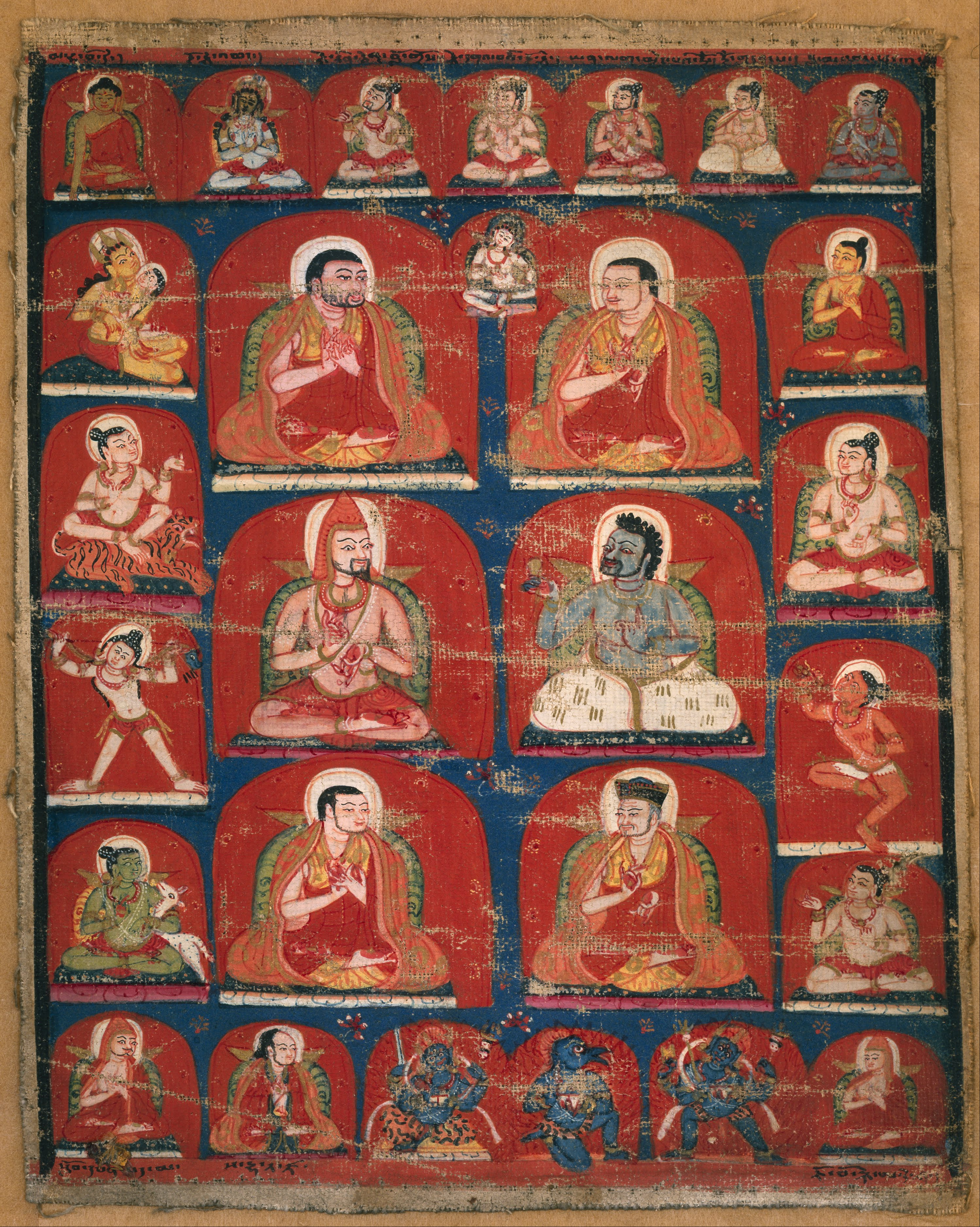
- Taglung Lineage Teachers, 14th-century painting in the Rubin Museum of Art

- Location within Tibet

Religion
- Affiliation: Tibetan Buddhism
- Sect: Taklung Kagyu

Location
- Country: China
- Interactive map of Taklung Monastery
- Coordinates: 30°08′N 91°06′E

Architecture
- Founder: Taklung Thangpa Tashi Pal
- Established: 1180; 846 years ago

Taklung Monastery, Taklung stag-lung, Taklung Yarthang Monastery, Pel Taklug Tang (dPal sTag lung thang) or Taklung or Taglung Gompa is a Kagyu Buddhist monastery about 120 km north of Lhasa.

== History ==
The monastery was founded in 1180 (or 1178) CE by Taklung Thangpa Tashi Pal (1142–1210), on a site previously inhabited by a famous Kadampa lama, Potowa Rinchen Sel, who was a disciple of Dromton (1005–1064), Atisha's chief disciple. It is the main seat of the Taklung Kagyu, one of the four chief schools of the Kagyu sect.

Through the efforts of Taklung Thangpa Tashi Pal, and his immediate successors, the number of monks eventually increased to 7,000. The main temple known as the Tsuklakhang (the Jokhang of Taklung) was completed in 1228.

"The sTag-lung-pa Lama [about the end of the 12th century] exemplifies the disciplined and pious existence of the founder of a great monastery. The Blue Annals (pp. 610-20) describes the simple austerity of his life, which was a continual process of silent meditation, preaching, ceremonies and rites. No wine or meat was allowed in his monastery, and no woman might enter his house. He never went for a walk beyond the limits of his monastery, and he never failed to attend to the rites and teachings given by his own Lama Phag-mo-gru (1110-1170 CE). His advice was constantly sought, and he was frequently called upon to mediate in the disputes of his contemporaries."

An eastern branch, Riwoche Monastery in Kham, which was founded by the fourth preceptor, Sangye On, and it gradually gained in importance as the Gelugpa monasteries of Sera and Drepung extended their influence at Taklung. Eventually its power diminished in favour of Riwoche. From the time of the founding of Riwoche Monastery (1276 CE) the Taklung lineage was divided into "upper" and "lower" branches, Taklung forming the "upper" branch.

Taklung was badly damaged during the Cultural Revolution but has since been partially restored.

== Description ==
The massive 13th-century Tsuklakang and the Markang or Red Temple now just form extensive ruins. However, the Jampa Lhakhang dedicated to Maitreya, the Reliquary Lhakhang which contains the remains of the now-looted enormous stupas which once contained the remains of Lhakhang's three founders, the Dargyeling Temple with its statue of Aksobhya Buddha, and the Assembly Hall or Zhelrekhang, and some smaller buildings have been reconstructed.

== Gallery ==
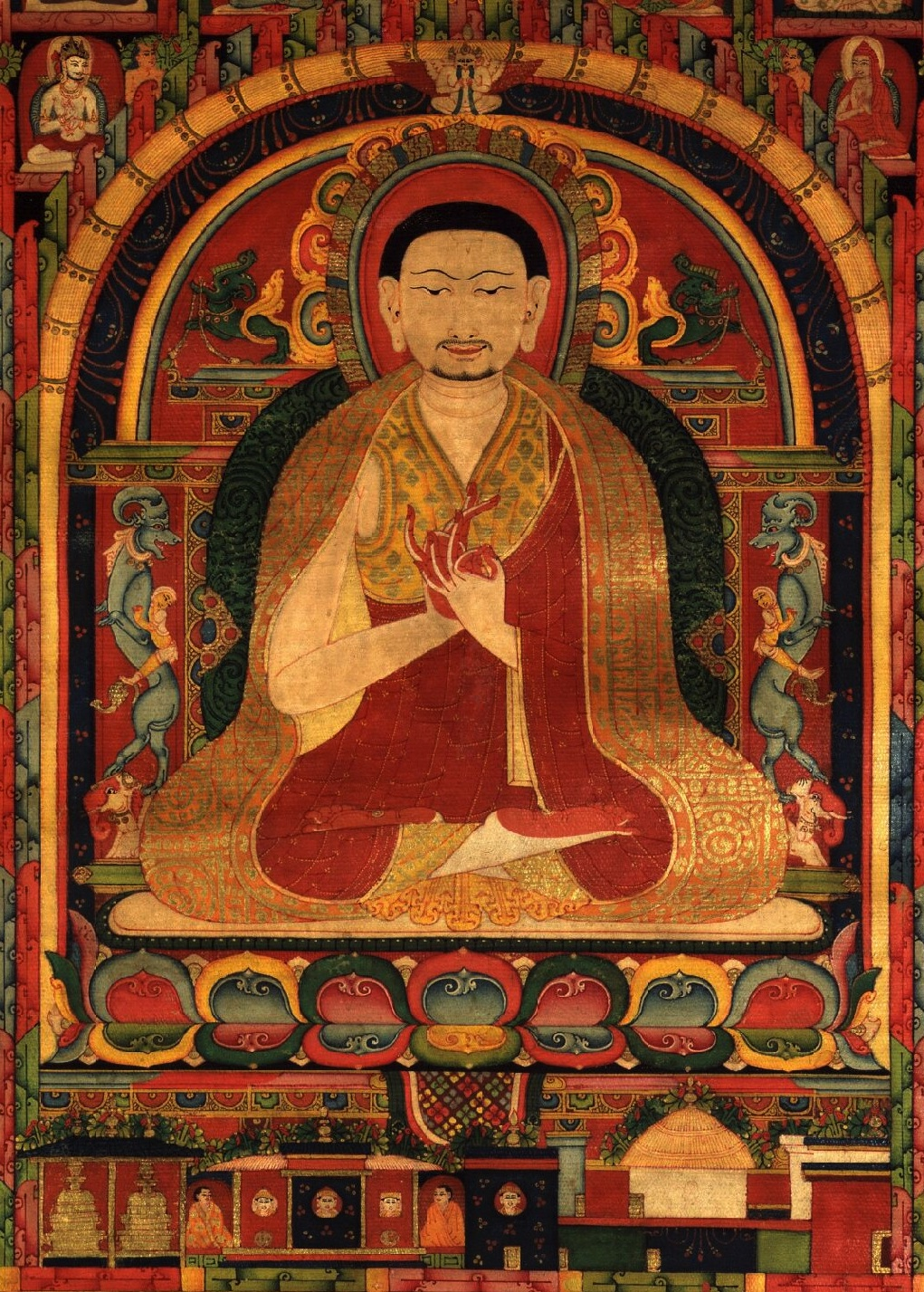
Taklung Thangpa Tashi Pal, founder of Taklung Monastery

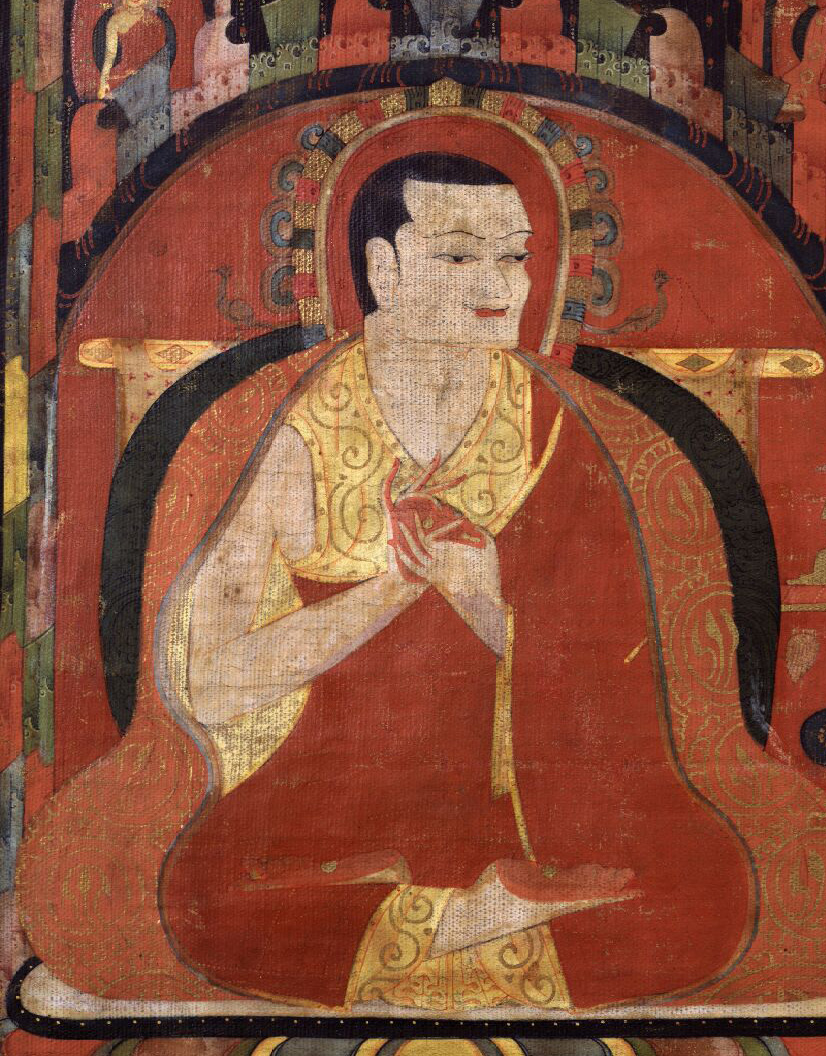
Kuyelwa Rinchen Gon, the second abbot

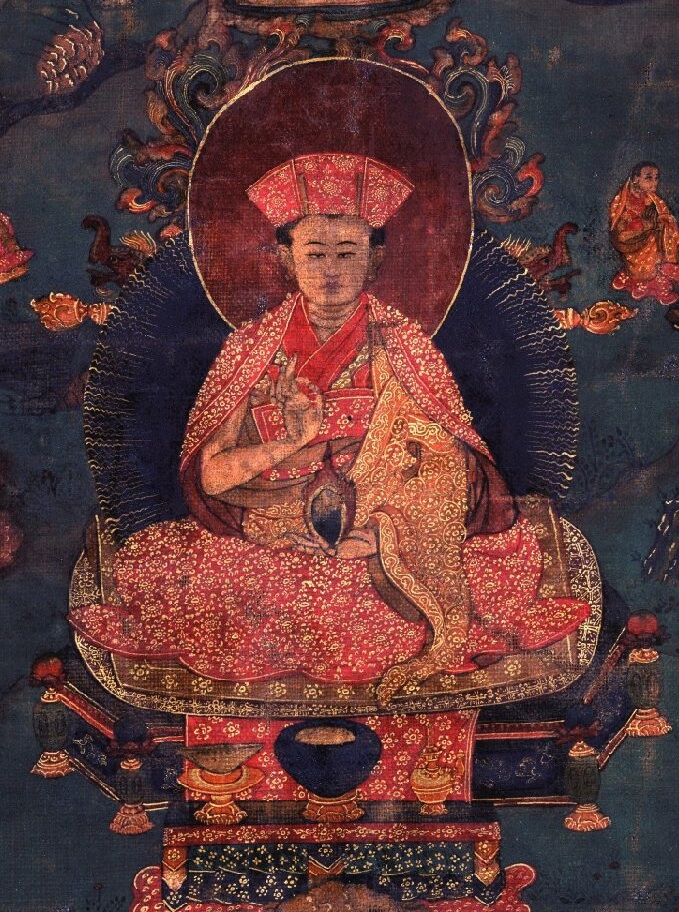
Tashi Peltsek, the ninth abbot

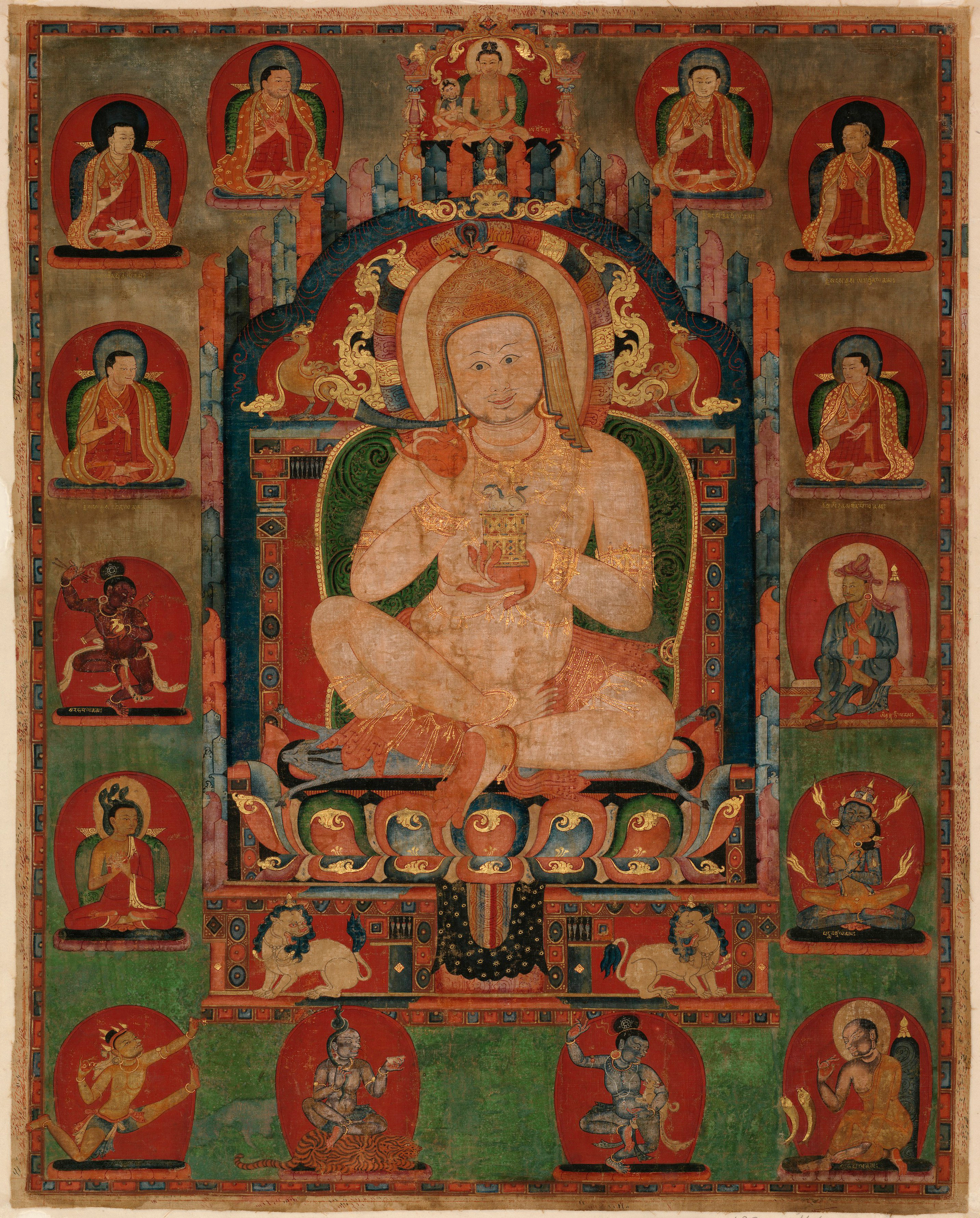
Top (left of center) Onpo Lama Rinpoche (1251–1296), who briefly served as the abbot of Taklung and was the founder of Riwoche Monastery

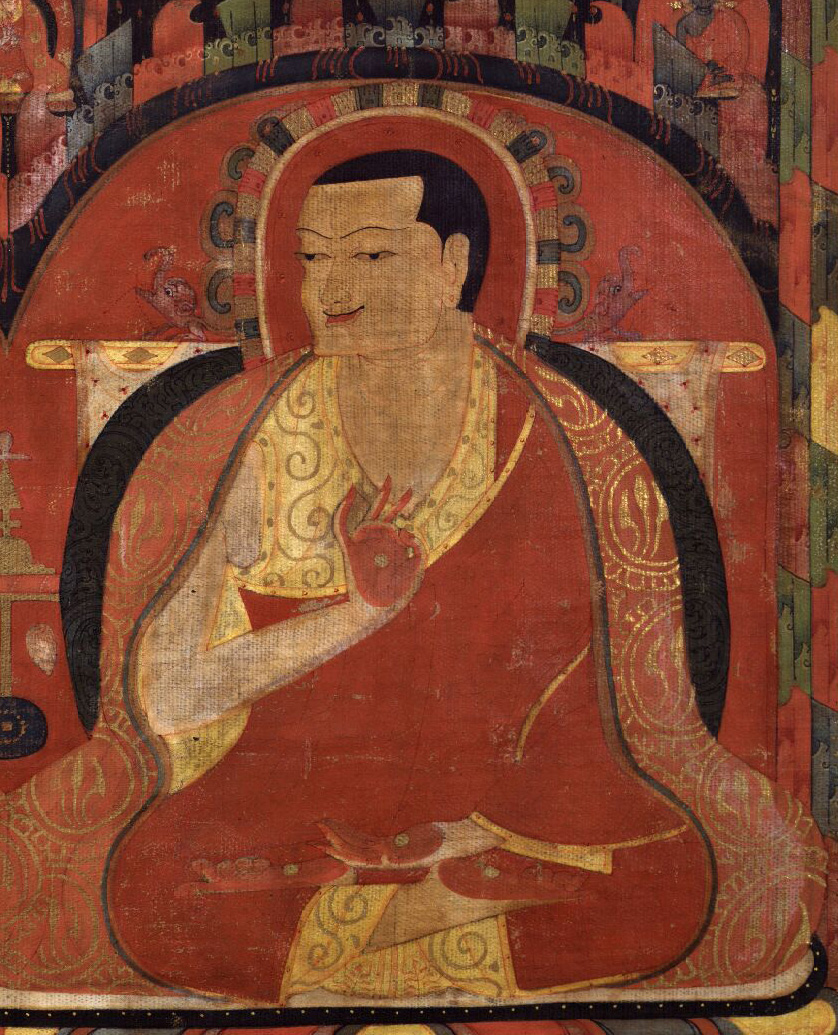
Sangye Yarjon, b.1203 - d.1272, 3rd Abbot of Taklung Tang Monastery

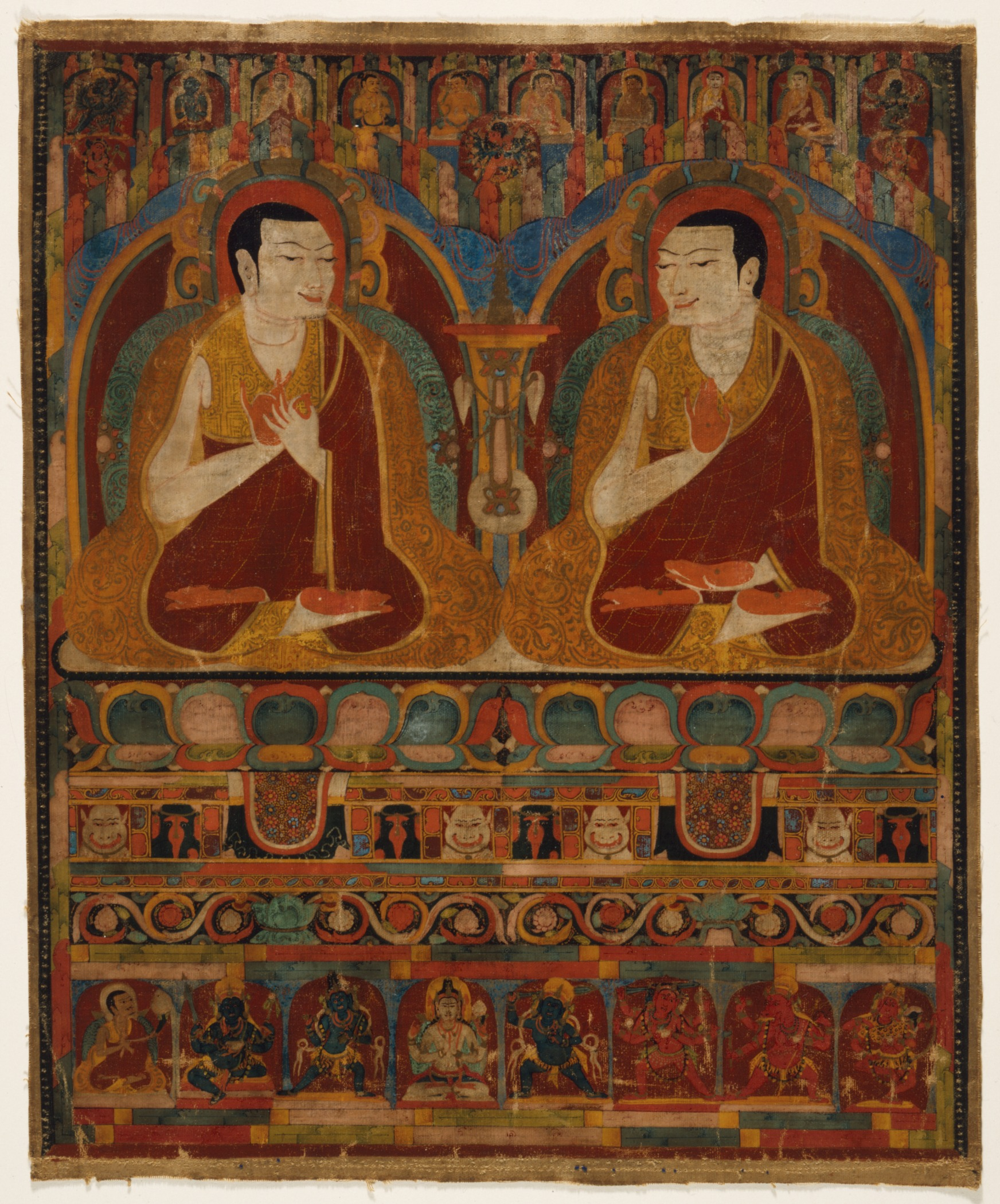
13th century painted thangka of mineral pigments and gold on cotton cloth of two Taklung Lamas, Taklung Monastery, Tibet

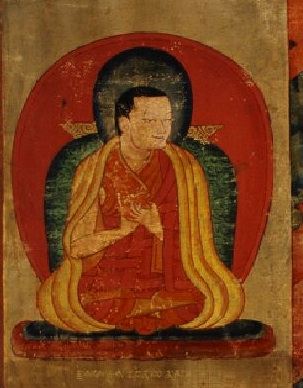
Born in Yangsho Bongra in Kham, Tibet in 1251 was the reincarnation of Gampopa Sonam Rinchen. He received teachings and the new name Drakpa Pel Ozer Zangpo from his uncle Sanggye Yarjon, the third abbot of Taklung Monastery. He later founded Pel Riwoche Monastery in 1276, serving as the first abbot until his death in 1296 at the age of forty-six.

== See also ==
- Taklung Monastery, Nagarzê
