= Zhang Yudrakpa Tsöndru Drakpa =

Founder of the Tshalpa Kagyu sect of Tibetan Buddhism

Zhang Yudrakpa Tsöndru Drakpa (1122–93) (zhang g.yu brag pa brtson 'gru brags pa), also known as Gungtang Lama Zhang (gung-thang bla-ma zhang) and often simply as Lama Zhang, was the founder of the Tshalpa Kagyu sect of Tibetan Buddhism. He was a prominent religious figure, and his extensive involvement in the political and military conflicts of Tibet was controversial at the time. Lama Zhang played a key role in the medieval Buddhist revival in Central Tibet, also called the “Tibetan renaissance”.

Lama Zhang was most likely the first to establish a system of theocratic rulership centered on the figure of the charismatic lama in the Lhasa area of Central Tibet. He created a template for later theocratic leaders of Lhasa, including the future Dalai Lama. Together with Phagmo Drupa Dorje Gyalpo and Tsongkhapa, Zhang Yudrakpa was considered as one of the "Three Jewels of Tibet" (bod nor bu rnam gsum).

Despite his controversy and complexity, Lama Zhang was highly respected by the great Tibetan meditation masters in his time, and he had an important role in Tibetan history. A significant symbol of his place of prominence is Gampopa's red hat that Lama Zhang wore and that is depicted in paintings and sculptures of him. The hat was passed down by way of Gampopa's cousin Gonpo Tsultrim Nyingpo. The hat marks Lama Zhang's legacy in the transformation of Tibetan society and power structures.

== Biographical details ==
Lama Zhang was born in August 1123 at Tsawadru (Wylie: tsha ba gru) in the Kyi River Valley located in the southern part of present-day Lhasa and was named Darma Drak. He was the son of Zhang Dorje Sempa, a lay tantric practitioner belonging to the Nanam (Wylie: sna nam) clan, and Shümo Zamangkyi, who had formerly been a Buddhist nun. Tibetan hagiographies relate many auspicious signs occurring at his birth and during his infancy.

During his childhood his mother encouraged his religious education, taking him to listen to religious discourses by the teacher Majo Darma. At the age of seven, Zhang received teachings in the basic Buddhist doctrines of prajnaparamita, abhidharma and pramana from Sambu Lotsawa, and teachings in different tantras, including Hevajra and Mahākāla, from Lama Ngokpa. At this time he was also taught the practice of black magic. In his autobiography, Lama Zhang records “contradictory traits” and struggles with evil impulses from an early age—including the killing of and cruelty towards animals. He took part in goat sacrifices as part of destructive magical rites. When his parents died, he went into suicidal despair; he blamed the bad karma of his black magic for their deaths.

He wandered about in despair in Kham, where he took novice vows, and a year later had a dream that his bad karma was cleansed when a slimy snake-like creature slithered out of his body. In 1148 he took complete monastic vows along with the name Tsondru Drakpa. While in Kham, Lama Zhang studied tantra and took empowerments including the Cakrasaṃvara Tantra from Ga Lotsāwa.

Lama Zhang returned to U where he furthered his study and training. He trained with a number of teachers and then in 1154 met Gonpo Tsultrim Nyingpo (Gomtsul for short), nephew of Gampopa. During his time with Gomtsul, Lama Zhang had numerous meditative experiences and received the full Kagyu lineage transmission, which is when he composed his most widely read literary work, The Path of Ultimate Profundity (phyag chen lam mchog mthar thug).

In the 1160s there were battles over property disputes between different monastic factions in Lhasa. As a respected religious leader by all parties, Gomtsul was asked to mediate and successfully resolved the issues. In the course of the fighting, the holiest sites of Lhasa, the Jokhang and Ramoche temples, were badly damaged. After a few years of restoration work, Gomtsul ordered Lama Zhang to protect Lhasa from further violence and destruction.

Lama Zhang established his own monastery of Tsel Gungtang strategically across the Kyichu River in 1175. During the construction of this and other monasteries, he sometimes used his political power and military force to take materials for construction. During some battles Lama Zhang called on fierce Dharma protectors to help him win campaigns, and at other times he asked his soldiers to tame the enemies with bodhicitta, and called on the three jewels. His role as the ruler of Lhasa is complex and difficult to simplify.

At the age of sixty-one, Zhang suffered a life-threatening illness and went into a nearly unbroken period of retreat that lasted for the remainder of his life. He remained silent most of the time and only allowed a few people into his retreat. One person he welcomed was the first Karmapa, Düsum Khyenpa. In 1189, the Karmapa traveled from Kham to persuade Lama Zhang to stop his military activities. Some stories described Lama Zhang and the First Karmapa to consider each other as equals. One story says that during the Karmapa's visit to Tsel Gungtang, the Karmapa was slapped by Lama Zhang three times. Before his guards could retaliate, the Karmapa quickly said "Lama Zhang has just extended my life by three years!"

Lama Zhang was in the process of building a large stupa when he died in 1193. The base had already been completed. The upper levels were turned into a cremation platform, and later into a reliquary to enshrine his bodily remains. His disciple Nyamme Śākya Yeshe (mnyam med shAkya ye shes) succeeded him as abbot of Tsel Gungtang.

== Disciples ==
- Lhachuk Kharwa Nyida O (1135–1215), founder of Jupu and Lhachuk Monasteries
- Nyamme Śākya Yeshe (1147–1207)
- Rokam Nyima Sherab (1139–1208)
- Kharagpa Dulwa O (b. 1100?)

== Writings ==
A collection of the works of Zhang Yudrakpa in nine volumes (edited by Khenpo Shedup Tenzin and Lama Thinley Namgyal) was published as dpal ldan tshal pa bka' brgyud kyi bstan pa'i mnga' bdag zhang g.yu brag pa brtson 'grus grags pa'i gsung 'bum rin po che: (The Collected Works of Zhaṅ brtson 'grus grags pa 1123-1193). Kathmandu: Shree Gautam Buddha Vihar, 2004.

The work The Ultimate Supreme Path of the Mahamudra has been translated in Mahamudra and Related Instructions: Core Teachings of the Kagyu Schools.

== Sources ==
- Davidson, Ronald M. (2005) Tibetan Renaissance: Tantric Buddhism in the Rebirth of Tibetan Culture. New York: Columbia University Press. ISBN 978-0-231-13471-2
- Jackson, David. (1994) Enlightenment by a Single Means: Tibetan Controversies on the "Selfsufficient White Remedy" (dkar po chig thub). Vienna: Österreichische Akademie der Wissenschaften. ISBN 978-3-7001-2162-6
- Roerich, George N. (Translator) (1949) The Blue Annals. Reprinted: Motilal Banarsidass, Delhi 1988.
- Smith, E. Gene. "Golden Rosaries of the Bka' brgyud Schools." in Among Tibetan Texts: History and Literature of the Himalayan Plateau, ed. Kurtis R. Schaeffer, Boston: Wisdom Publications, 2001. ISBN 0-86171-179-3
- Sørenson, Per, and Hazod, Guntram. (2007) Rulers on the Celestial Plain: Ecclesiastic and Secular Hegemony in Medieval Tibet: A Study of Tshal Gung-thang. Wien: Verlag der Österreichischen Akademie der Wissenschaften. ISBN 978-3-7001-3828-0
- 'Tshal pa kun dga' rdo rje. Deb ther dmar po. 1981 Beijing: Mi rigs dpe skrun khang
- Yamamoto, Carl Shigeo (2009). "Vision and Violence: Lama Zhang and the Dialectics of Political Authority and Religious Charisma in Twelfth-Century Central Tibet". UVA Library. PhD dissertation, Department of Religious Studies at the University of Virginia. ISBN 978-1-109-22542-6
