= Dagpo Tashi Namgyal =

Tibetan lama

Dakpo Tashi Namgyal (Dakpo Paṇchen Tashi Namgyel; Tibetan: དྭགས་པོ་པཎ་ཆེན་བཀྲ་ཤིས་རྣམ་རྒྱལ, Wylie: dwags po paN chen bkra shis rnam rgyal, THL: dak po pen chen tra shi nam gyel) (1511, 1512, or 1513–1587) was a lineage holder of the Dagpo Kagyu lineage of Tibetan Buddhism. He was also trained in the Sakya lineage, and was renowned as both a scholar and yogi.

He should not be confused with his namesake, also known as Kunkyen Tashi Namgyal, (1399–1458), who helped establish Penpo Nalendra Monastery in 1425 with Sakya master Rongton Sheja Kunrig (1367–1449). Later in life he served as chief abbot of the Kagyu Daklha Gampo Monastery in southern Tibet.

His best known works are two Mahamudra texts, Moonlight of Mahamudra and Clarifying the Natural State. The latter is a meditation manual which covers the Mahamudra path of meditation, including the general and specific preliminaries, the development of mindfulness and calm through shamatha practice, insight through vipashyana techniques, and recognition of the natural state as the union of shamatha and vipashyana.

Some of his works are available in Tibetan in the "Rigpa Dorje Practice Series."

He was one of the teachers of Mikyö Dorje, the 8th Karmapa Lama.

Details of Tashi Namgyal's biography come primarily from an account written by Lama Trinle Choedak, the personal tutor of the 6th Zimwock Rinpoche.

== Works ==
=== Translated into English ===
- Dakpo Tashi Namgyal; Elizabeth Callahan (2019). Moonbeams of Mahamudra (Tsadra) (1st ed.). Boulder, CO, USA: Snow Lion. ISBN 978-1559394802.
- Dakpo Tashi Namgyal; Traleg Kyabgon (2016). Moonbeams of Mahamudra: The Classic Meditation Manual (1st ed.). Ballarat, Victoria, Australia: Shogam Publications. ISBN 978-0980502237.
- Bkra-shis-rnam-rgyal; Peter Alan Roberts (2010). "Light Rays from the Jewel of the Excellent Teaching: A General Presentation on the Points of Secret Mantra". Mahāmudrā and Related Instructions: Core Teachings of the Kagyü Schools. Somerville, MA, USA: Wisdom Publications. pp. 401–620.
- Dakpo Tashi Namgyal; Lobsang P. Lhalungpa (2006). Mahāmudrā - the Moonlight: Quintessence of Mind and Meditation (2nd ed.). Somerville, MA, USA: Wisdom Publications. ISBN 0-86171-299-4.
- Bkra-śis-rnam-rgyal; Erik Pema Kunsang (2001). Clarifying the natural state: a principal guidance manual for Mahamudra. Boulder, CO, USA: Rangjung Yeshe. ISBN 9627341452.

=== In Tibetan ===
- Bkra-shis-rnam-rgyal (2015). dpal kye rdo rje zhes bya ba'i rgyud kyi rgyal po 'grel pa legs sgad nyi ma'i 'od zer (དཔལ་ཀྱེའི་་རྡོ་རྗེ་ཞེས་བྱ་བའི་རྒྱུད་ཀྱི་རྒྱལ་པོ་འགྲེལ་པལེགས་བཤད་ཉི་མའི་འོད་ཟེར་) (in Tibetan). སི་ཁྲོན་མི་རིགས་དཔེ་སྐྲུན་ཁང་. ISBN 978-7-5409-5920-3.
