= Taklung Tangpa =

Tibetan Buddhist title

Taklung Tangpa is a Tibetan Buddhist title, referring back to the founding of the Taklung Kagyu 800 years ago.

It has some relationship with the biography of the 15th Talung Rinpoche.
