= The Jewel Ornament of Liberation =

Key text in the Kagyu tradition of Tibetan Buddhism

The Jewel Ornament of Liberation or Ornament of Precious Liberation (Tibetan: དམ་ཆོས་ཡིད་བཞིན་གྱི་ནོར་བུ་ཐར་པ་རིན་པོ་ཆེའི་རྒྱན, Wylie: dam chos yid bzhin nor bu thar pa rin po che'i rgyan) is a key text in the Kagyu tradition of Tibetan Buddhism, said to capture the essence of both the Kadampa and Kagyüpa lineages of Mahayana teachings. The text was written by Gampopa (1074-1153 C.E.), one of the two most important disciples of Milarepa.

Gampopa, both a Kadampa monk and Vajrayana student of the famed yogi Milarepa, based this text on Atisha's "Lamp for the Path to Enlightenment". It's a critically important text to study as a foundation for the traditional three year retreat.

Gampopa said, "For anyone who wishes to see me, studying The Jewel Ornament of Liberation and The Precious Garland of the Excellent Path is the same as meeting me." This text contains the complete form of Mahayana Buddhism — from the starting point of Buddha-nature, all the way to enlightenment.

== Outline ==
The text is structured around the following points:

1. The primary cause: buddha nature.
2. The support: precious human existence.
3. The contributory cause: the spiritual teacher.
4. The methods of practice.
5. The result: perfect buddhahood.
6. The activities of the Buddha.

== Buddha Nature ==
According to The Jewel Ornament, all living beings — even the smallest insects — have the potential of Buddhahood, as all beings possess some of this same essence, or Buddha nature. Gampopa presented the example of the sesame seed and sesame seed oil: Though the oil is present in the sesame seed, there are steps to take to separate (or realize) the oil.

== Translations into English ==
The text by Gampopa was first translated into English by Herbert Guenther in 1959. More recent translations include that of Khenpo Konchog Gyaltsen Rinpoche in 1998. Ken Holmes's translation, Ornament of Precious Liberation, was published in 2017.

== Tibetan Text ==
- དམ་ཆོས་ཡིད་བཞིན་གྱི་ནོར་བུ་ཐར་པ་རིན་པོ་ཆེའི་རྒྱན་, dam chos yid bzhin gyi nor bu thar pa rin po che'i rgyan
