= Jigme Rinpoche =

Jigme Rinpoche can refer to one of the following Tibetan Buddhist lamas:

- Lama Jigme Rinpoche (Kagyu) or Jigme Rinpoche, of the Karma Kagyu school
- Taklung Ma Rinpoche, Tenzin Kunzang Jigme Rinpoche
- Jigme Phuntsok (1933–2004), Nyingma lama from Sertha Region
- Jigme Lhundup Rinpoche
