= 1st Karmapa, Düsum Khyenpa =

Gyalwa Karmapa of Kagyu Tibetan Buddhism (1110–1193)

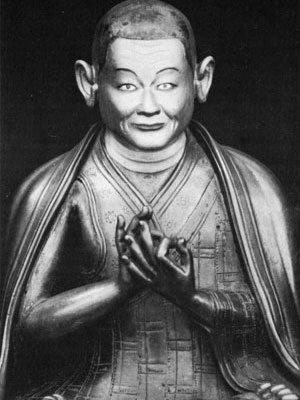
The 1st Karmapa, Düsum Khyenpa (1110–1193)

The 1st Karmapa, Düsum Khyenpa (Tibetan: དུས་གསུམ་མཁྱེན་པ་, Wylie: dus gsum mkhyen pa, 1110–1193) was the 1st Gyalwa Karmapa, head of the Karma Kagyu school of Tibetan Buddhism. His name Düsum Khyenpa means "knower of the three times", the past, present and future. It was given to him to refer to the knowledge of the three forms of time he gained at his enlightenment, including the "timeless time" of enlightened awareness.

== History ==
Düsum Khyenpa was born to a devout family of Buddhist practitioners in Teshö in Kham and was called Gephel as a child. He first studied with his father and then continued training with other Buddhist teachers in the region.

Gephel was a gifted child who studied and practiced Buddhism intently from an early age. Already quite learned by the age of twenty, he became a monk and studied the sutras and tantras intensively for another ten years. At thirty, he went to Daklha Gampo, the monastery of Gampopa, to receive teachings directly from Gampopa, a heart student of Milarepa. He trained formally in the foundation practices of the Kadam tradition and, following that, in the general philosophy of the sutras during his time there.

Gephel received empowerments and instruction in the Hevajra tantra and spent four years in strict retreat, training in samatha and vipassanā. He then received the full transmission of the inner instructions of the Kagyu tradition. In nine days he absorbed what Naropa had received over 12 years from Tilopa. Rechungpa, the "moon-like" disciple of Milarepa, also instructed him, principally in the Six Yogas of Naropa. His attainment in one of these - tummo - was particularly boosted by his own natural compassion, and produced rapid results. Following his teacher's instruction he then went away to meditate.

Gampopa eventually died and Dusum Khyenpa returned to Daklha Gampo to honor his remains. He had a powerful vision of his teacher and knew that it was time to implement one of his final instructions: To go to the place where he would achieve enlightenment - Kampo Kangra - and to practice mahamudra there. He promised that he would live until the age of 84, in order to benefit the Dharma. He achieved enlightenment at the age of fifty, while practicing dream yoga. He had a vision at that time of the dakinis offering him a vajra crown woven from their hair.

From then onwards, his teaching activity was as intense as his activity in building monastic centers. In 1164 at the age of 55, he founded a monastery at Kampo Nenang, and at the age of 60 he established Panphuk Monastery in Lithang, eastern Tibet. Then in 1185 at the age of 76, he established an important seat at Karma Gon Monastery in Chamdo, in Kham and, at the age of 80 his main seat at Tsurphu Monastery, in central Tibet along the valley of the Tolung River, which feeds into the Brahmaputra River.

The khenpo of the Buddhist monastery at Bodh Gaya sent a conch to Düsum Khyenpa at Tsurphu. The Conch symbolism is found in many stories of the sixteen Karmapas.

Düsum Khyenpa made predictions about future Karmapas. In particular, he was the first Karmapa to present a prediction letter detailing his future incarnation. He gave it to his main disciple, Drogon Rechen, predecessor of the Tai Situpa line, who passed it to his own student Pomdrakpa. Pomdrakpa recognized the 2nd Karmapa, Karma Pakshi after they met.

Fulfilling his promise, Düsum Khyenpa passed at the age of 84. His heart was found intact in the funeral pyre and some of his remaining bones bore self manifesting symbols of Buddhas.

Among his main disciples were Taklung Thangpa Tashi Pal, founder of the Taklung Kagyu; Tsangpa Gyare, founder of the Drukpa Lineage now widespread in Bhutan; and the Nyingma master Katok Dampa Deshek, founder of Katok Monastery.

The forefathers in the Kagyu lineage are known as the "Golden Rosary." The lineage of the Kagyu emphasizes the continuity of oral instructions passed on from master to student. The principal student who held the lineage of the Golden Rosary from the First Karmapa was Drogon Rechen.

An ink and gouache drawing of Düsum Khyenpa was found in a statue of the Buddha and is in the Victoria and Albert Museum.

== See also ==
- Tulku
- Lucid dream

== Footnotes ==
Preceded by Gampopa (spiritual predecessor)	Reincarnation of the Karmapa	Succeeded by Karma Pakshi
