= Phagdru Kagyu =

The Phagmo Drupa Kagyu (Tibetan: ཕག་མོ་གྲུ་པ་བཀའ་བརྒྱུད, Wylie: phag mo gru pa bka' brgyud) or Phagdru Kagyu (ཕག་གྲུ་བཀའ་བརྒྱུད) is a subschool of the Tibetan Kagyu school.

== History ==
It was founded by Phagmo Drupa Dorje Gyalpo (Tibetan: ཕག་མོ་གྲུ་པ་རྡོ་རྗེ་རྒྱལ་པོ, Wylie: phag mo gru pa rdo rje rgyal po, 1110–1170) who was the elder brother of the famous Nyingma lama Ka Dampa Deshek (1122–1192) founder of Katok Monastery. Before meeting Gampopa, Dorje Gyalpo studied with Sachen Kunga Nyingpo (sa chen kun dga' snying po) (1092–1158) from whom he received lamdre transmission.

In 1158 Dorje Gyalpo built a reed-hut hermitage at Phakmo Drupa ("Sow's Ferry Crossing") in a juniper forest in Nedong (Tibetan: སྣེ་གདོང, Wylie: sne gdong) high above the Brahmaputra River. Later, as his fame spread and disciples gathered, this site developed into the major monastic seat of Dentsa Thel (Tibetan: གདན་ས་ཐེལ, Wylie: gdan sa thel). Following his death the monastery declined and his disciple Jigten Sumgön sent Chenga Drakpa Jungne (Tibetan: སྤྱན་སྔ་གྲགས་པ་འབྱུང་གནས, Wylie: spyan snga grags pa 'byung-gnas; 1175–1255), a member of the Lang (Wylie: rlang) family, to become abbot and look after the monastery.

Chenga Drakpa Jungne was abbot for 21 years and restored the monastery to its former grandeur. In 1253 when the Sakyapas came to power they appointed Dorje Pel [(Tibetan: རྡོ་རྗེ་དཔལ, Wylie: rdo rje dpal)] the brother of Chenga Drakpa Jungne as Tripon [hereditary myriarch] of Nedon. From that time on the Tripon who as a monk, assumed the seat of government of Nedon and also ruled as abbot at Dentsa Thel and his brothers married in order to perpetuate the family line. This tie with the monastery founded by Phagmo Drupa led to the Tripons of Nedong to become known as Phagdru (short of Phagmo Drupa) Tripon and their period of rule in Tibet as the Phagmo Drupa period (or Phagmodrupa dynasty).

Tai Situ Changchub Gyaltsen (1302–1364) was born into this Lang family. In 1322, he was appointed by the Sakyapas as the Pagmodru Myriarch of Nedong and given the title "Tai Situ" in the name of the Yuan emperor. Soon he fought with a neighboring myriarchy trying to recover land lost in earlier times. This quarrel displeased the Sakya ruler (dpon-chen) Gyelwa Zangpo (Tibetan: རྒྱལ་བ་བཟང་པོ, Wylie: rgyal ba bzang po) who dismissed him as myriach. Following a split between Gyelwa Zangpo and his minister Nangchen Wangtsön (Tibetan: ནང་ཆེན་དབང་བརྩོན, Wylie: nang chen dbang brtson), the former restored Changchup Gyeltsen to his position in 1352. Taking advantage of the situation, Changchup Gyeltsen immediately went on the offensive and soon controlled the whole of the central Tibetan province of Ü. Gyelwa Zangpo and Changchup Gyeltsen were reconciled at a meeting with the Sakya lama Künpangpa (Tibetan: བླ་མ་ཀུན་སྤངས་པ, Wylie: bla ma kun spangs pa). This angered Nangchen Wangtsön, who usurped Gyelwa Zangpo as Sakya ruler and imprisoned him.

In 1351 Changchup Gyeltsen established an important Kagyu monastery at the ancient Tibetan capital of Tsetang. This was later dismantled during the time of the 7th Dalai Lama (18th century) and replaced by a Gelugpa monastery, Gaden Chokhorling.

In 1358, Wangtson assassinated Lama Kunpangpa. Learning of this, Changchup Gyeltsen then took his forces to Sakya, imprisoned Wangtsön, and replaced four hundred court officials and the newly appointed ruling lama. The Pagmodrupa rule of Central Tibet (U, Tsang and Ngari) dates from this coup in 1358.

As ruler, Changchup Gyeltsen was keen to revive the glories of the Tibetan Empire of Songtsän Gampo and assert Tibetan independence from the Yuan dynasty of the Mongols and from Ming China. He took the Tibetan title "Desi" (sde-srid), re-organized the thirteen myriarchies of the Yuan Shakya rulers into numerous districts (Wylie: rdzong), abolished Mongol law in favour of the old Tibetan legal code, and Mongol court dress in favour of traditional Tibetan dress.

Tai Situ Changchub Gyaltsen died in 1364 and was succeeded as by his nephew Jamyang Shakya Gyaltsen (Tibetan: ཇམ་དབྱངས་ཤ་ཀྱ་རྒྱལ་མཚན, Wylie: jam dbyangs sha kya rgyal mtshan; 1340–1373), who was also a monk. The subsequent rule of the Phagmodrupa dynasty lasted until 1435 followed by the Rinpungpa kings who ruled for four generations from 1435 to 1565 and the three Tsangpa kings from 1566 to 1641.

In 1406 the ruling Phagmodrupa prince, Drakpa Gyaltsen, turned down the imperial invitation to him to visit China.

From 1435 to 1481 the power of the Phagmodrupa declined and they were eclipsed by the Rinpungpa (Wylie: rin spungs pa) of Tsang, who patronized the Karma Kagyu.

The Phagmo Drupa monastery of Dentsa Thel "was completely destroyed during the Cultural Revolution in 1966–1978"
