= Taklung Ma Rinpoche =

Tenzin Kunzang Jigme Rinpoche, the seventh Taklung Matul Rinpoche, was born in 1977 to Ngawang Tendar and Deden Zangmo.

In 1987, the 14th Dalai Lama formally recognized him as the reincarnation of the sixth Taklung Matul Thupten Jigme Choechog Rinpoche. He spent a few years in Namgyal Monastery studying Buddhist philosophy and practice. In 1991 he entered the Institute of Buddhist Dialectics, Dharamsala to learn both the Sutra and Tantra teachings of the Buddha and completed his studies in 2003.

Having finished his Buddhist studies, he moved to Manali, Kulu, in Himachal Pradesh. Since there is no monastic seat of the Taklung Kagyu tradition in India, the Taklung Kagyu Rinpoches are jointly working for its establishment.

== Sources ==
- Official Website Of Taklung Kagyu: Lineage
- Official Website of Taklung Ma Rinpoche
