= Taklung Kagyu =

The Taklung Kagyu (Tibetan: སྟག་ལུང་བཀའ་བརྒྱུད་, Wylie: stag lung bka' brgyud) is a sub-school of the Kagyu school of Tibetan Buddhism.

== History ==
The Taklung Kagyu lineage was founded by Taklung Thangpa Tashi Pal in 1180 CE. Like the other Sarma schools, it is part of the second founding of Buddhism in Tibet and incorporates the teachings of the early Kadam school. The Taklung Lineage teaches Mahamudra practices in particular.

The main seat of Taklung Kagyu is located in the northern part of Tibet in a place called Taklung. In the 13th century, Choejey Sangye Won, the fourth lineage holder, established Riwoche Monastery in Kham. This tradition later came to be known as the Marthang Taklung as distinct from the Lhasa Taklung.

Eventually, the Taklung Kagyu school spread throughout Tibet, parts of Mongolia, China and even India.

The current lineage holders are the 26th Taklung Shabdrung Rinpoche, the 7th Taklung Ma Rinpoche and the 7th Phakchok Rinpoche.

== Lineage ==
Marpa Lotsawa brought the Kagyu tradition from India after accomplishing his training with his main teacher Naropa, who in turn was the disciple of Tilopa, who received the transmission from Vajradhara and Vajrayogini.

Marpa's main disciple was Milarepa, who is one of the most famous yogis in Tibetan history. Milarepa transmitted this lineage to Gampopa, who was already a prominent teacher of the Kadam school.

Gampopa transmitted it to Phagmo Drupa Dorje Gyalpo, who was also a Kadampa. One of his main disciples was Taklung Thangpa Tashi Pal, who founded the Taklung Lineage.

== Sources ==
- Pal taklung kagyupe denrab lodru dordu su jodpa chushel karpö thengwa - Tenzin Kunga (translated: The brief history of Taklung Kagyu lineage called white crystal mala) (Tenzin Kunga is a scholar living in Dharamsala)

== See also ==
- Kagyu
