= Taklung Thangpa Tashi Pal =

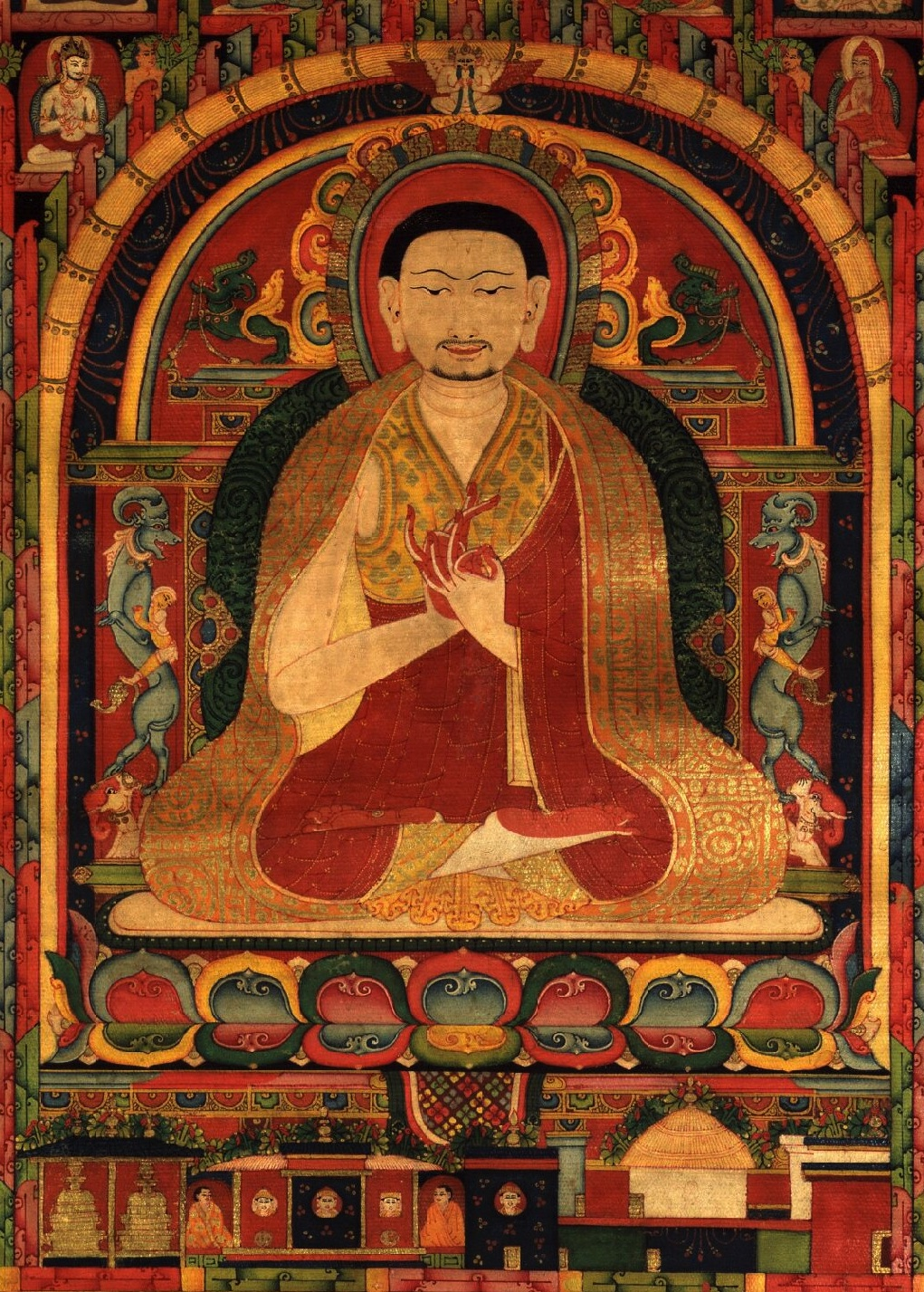
Tibetan Thanka Painting of Taklung Thangpa Tashi Pal

Taklung Thangpa Tashi Pal (1142–1210) is the Founder of the Taklung Kagyu lineage. The Taklung Kagyu lineage remains unbroken to this day.

Taklung Thangpa Tashi Pal founded the Taklung Yarthang Monastery. He is considered one of the many immediate students of Pal Phagmo Drupa.

== Early years ==
Tashi Pal was born in 1142 AD, to the Taklung Gazi family, one of the six main ancestral Tibetan lineages. He embraced monkhood in Pal Thang-kya Monastery, where he studied and mastered the general and distinct Buddhist teachings. Owing to his vast and profound knowledge of Buddhist doctrine, he was renowned as the great sovereign and accomplished master scholar.

He travelled towards Central Tibet where he met his destined root teacher, Phagmo Drupa. For six years, Tashi Pal served his master as his personal attendant during which time he received the entire tantric and sutric teachings, including the ripening empowerment and liberating instructions of the great Mahamudra and the six yogic teachings of Naropa. Later, he spent many years in six different solitary places staying in extremely strict retreat practice by sealing off his retreat room. As a result, he achieved the supreme siddhi of enlightenment.

== Taklung Kagyu ==
In the year 1180 AD, he established the seat and the distinct tradition of Taklung Kagyu at Taklung Thang Dorje Den. Since then, his name came to be known as Taklung Thangpa and his distinct tradition renowned as the unequalled lineage of accomplishment, the Taklung Kagyu.

The main teaching of Taklung Kagyu is Guru Yoga and the main practice devotion and reverence towards one's root teacher. Specifically Vinaya practice was greatly emphasized. As such, Taklung Thangpa Tashi Pal, fully ordained and holder of the Vajrayana doctrine, came to be famously known for his pure morality.

== Legacy ==
He devoted the first half of every month to bless and teach students, and the second half to strict retreat practice. Generally, there were more than 3600 resident monks in Taklung Monastery during his time, and his disciples came from different places in India, China, Mongolia, and the three provinces of Tibet.

After giving final advice to his followers, Taklung Thangpa achieved the non-dual state of Vajradhara and died to pass into nirvana, dissolving his body and mind into the Dharmakaya in the year 1210. This was displayed to allow beings to realize the impermanent nature of life.

== Sources ==
- http://www.taklungkagyu.com/aboutus.php?id=2
