= Daklha Gampo Monastery =

Buddhist monastery in Tibet

Coordinates: 29°07′N 92°48′E

Daklha Gampo Monastery (Dwags lha sgam po), also romanized as Daglha Gampo, is a Kagyu Tibetan Buddhist monastery founded in 1121 CE by Je Gampopa (1079-1153), the disciple of the famous and much-loved bodhisattva, Jetsun Milarepa (c. 1052—c. 1135) It is located in Gyatsa County in the old district of Dakpo in southern Tibet on land sanctified as a geomantic power-place ('head of the ogress') by the first Tibetan emperor, Songtsen Gampo (605 or 617? - 649), and made a repository of terma by Padmasambhava.

== Description ==
The monastery is located on a ridge to the northeast of the eight-peaked Dalka Gampo mountain range (after which it was named), on the right bank of the Gyabpurong River just north of its junction with the Yarlung Tsangpo.

== History ==
After Gampopa received the Kargyu teachings and transmissions from Milarepa. He established himself at Daklha Gampo after Milarepa had died. He taught several students who became instrumental in the flourishing of the Kagyu lineage. Daklha Gampo became the main Kagyu centre for Mahamudra studies and practice in Tibet.

During the 14th century, the great terton, Karma Lingpa, unearthed the famous Tibetan Book of the Dead (Bardo Thodol Chenmo) by Padmasambhava at Mount Gampodar which is within the territory of the monastery.

The Dzungar Mongols destroyed the monastery in 1718, but it was quickly rebuilt. It was again totally destroyed after the Chinese invasion in 1959, but some chapels have since been restored and there are still the original images of Avalokiteshvara and Cakrasamvara.
