= Gampopa =

Tibetan Buddhist teacher, monk and philosopher (1079–1153)

Gampopa Sönam Rinchen སྒམ་པོ་པ་བསོད་ནམས་རིན་ཆེན།
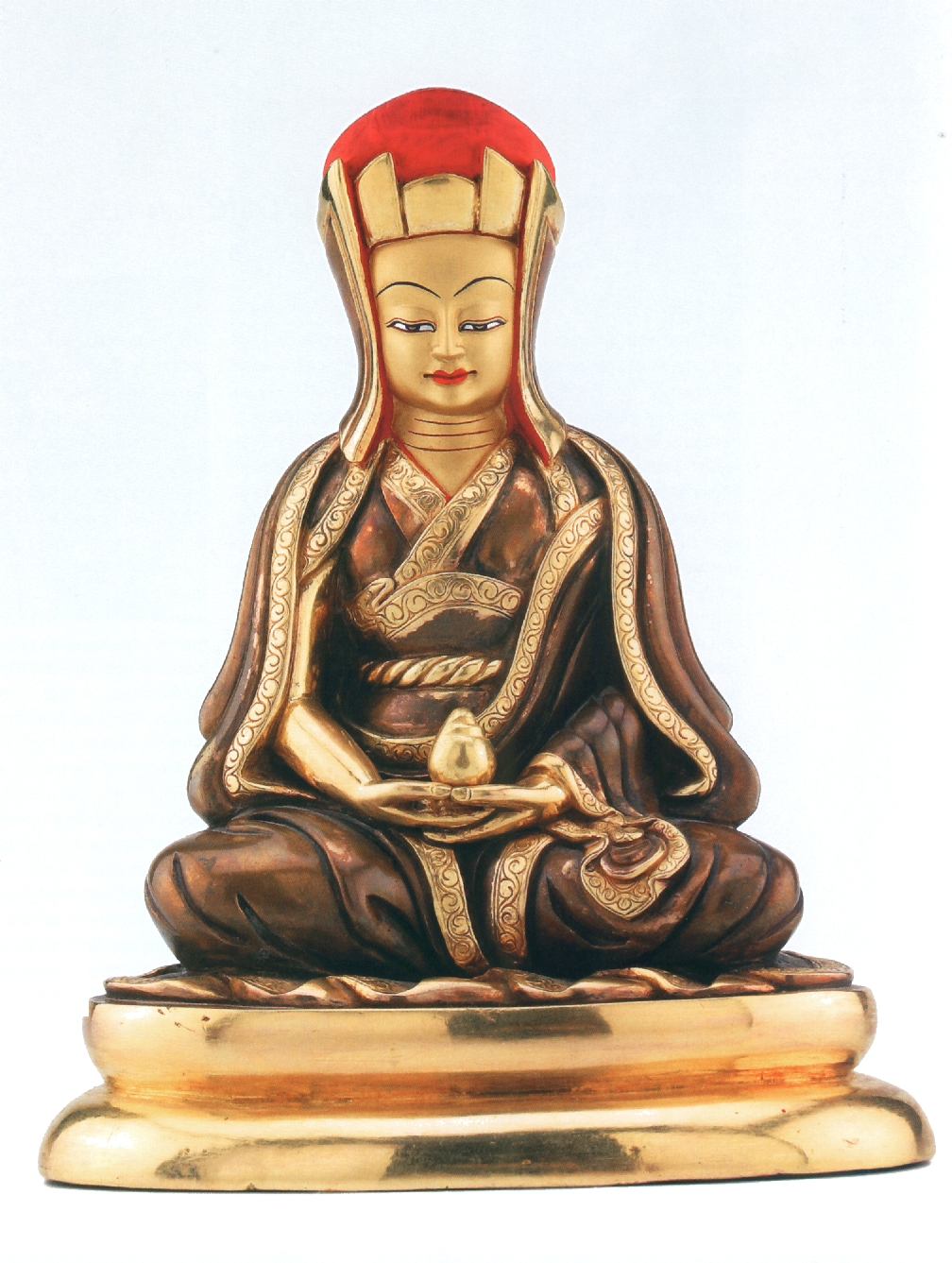
- Born: c. 1079 CE; Budnyi Chedrak Serlung, Nyel valley, Gyaza dzong and Lung dzong, Tibet
- Died: c. 1153 CE
- Occupations: Buddhist teacher, monk and philosopher
- Known for: Founder of the Dagpo Kagyu school and Daklha Gampo monastery, teacher of sutra Mahamudra.

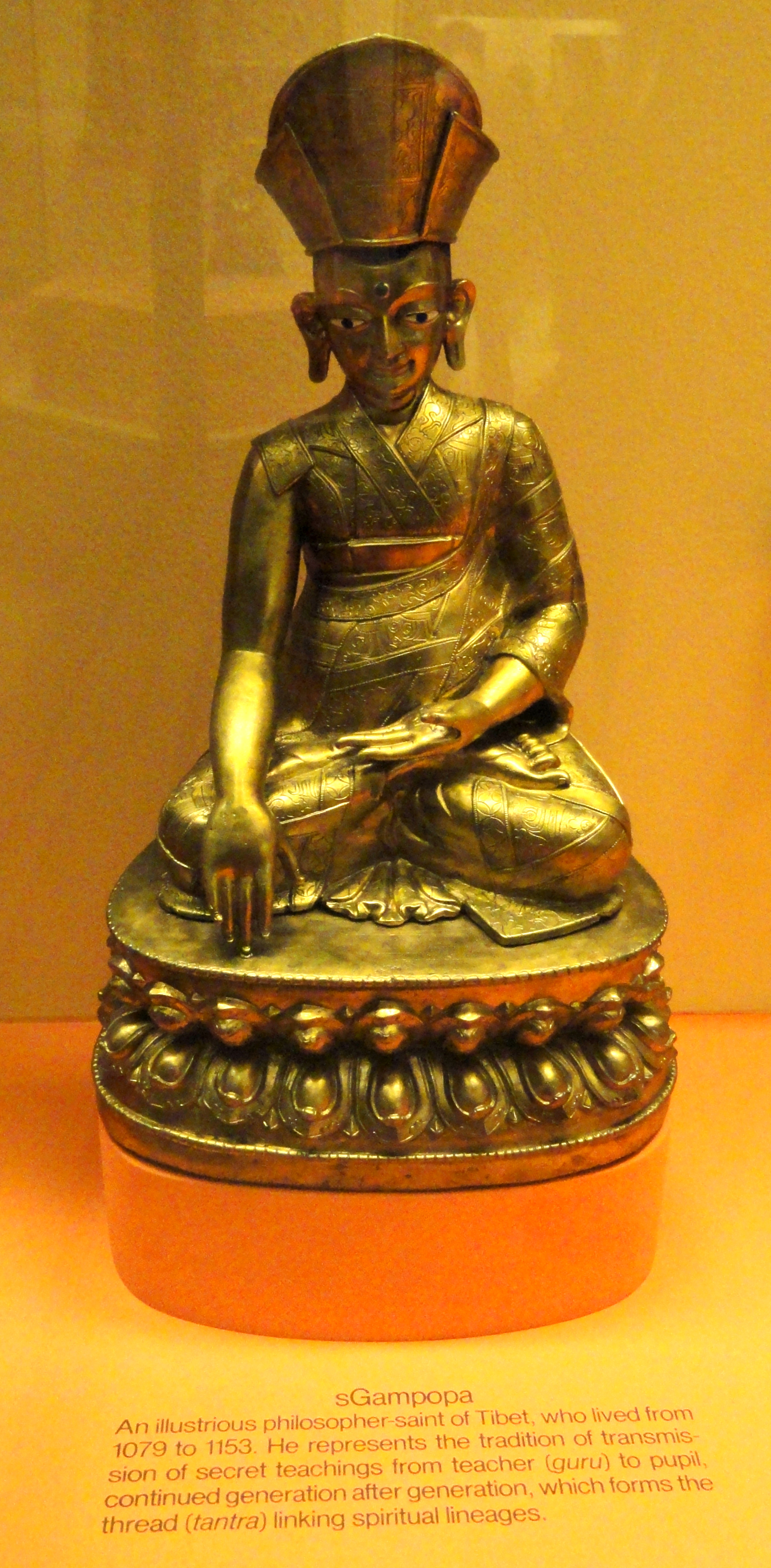
Gampopa in the American Museum of Natural History, New York City

Gampopa Sönam Rinchen (Tibetan: སྒམ་པོ་པ་བསོད་ནམས་རིན་ཆེན་, Wylie: sgam po pa bsod nams rin chen, 1079–1153) was the main student of Milarepa, and a Tibetan Buddhist master who codified his own master's ascetic teachings, which form the foundation of the Kagyu educational tradition. Gampopa was also a doctor and tantric master. He authored the first Lamrim text, Jewel Ornament of Liberation, and founded the Dagpo Kagyu school. He is also known as Dagpopa, and by the titles Dakpo Lharjé "the physician from Dakpo" (Tibetan: དྭགས་པོ་ལྷ་རྗེ་, Wylie: dwags po lha rje) and Daö Zhönnu, "Candraprabhakumara" (Tibetan: ཟླ་འོད་ཞོན་ནུ་, Wylie: zla 'od gzhon nu).

== Biography ==
Gampopa was born in the Nyal (or Nyel) district, Central Tibet and from an early age was a student of medicine in the Indian, Chinese and Tibetan medical traditions. Later in his life he moved to the region of Dakpo (dwags po) in southern Tibet and hence was also called Dakpopa (dwags po pa), the man from Dakpo. The region is also near Gampo Hills, hence his other name, Gampopa. In his youth Gampopa studied under the Nyingma lama Barey as well as under the Kadampa teacher Geshe Yontan Drag. He married a daughter of a man named Chim Jose Darma Wo (mchims jo sras dar ma 'od) and had a child, but they both died, causing him to renounce the householder's life. In 1104, at the age of twenty-five he took ordination, either in Dakpo or in Penyul, at Gyachak Ri monastery (phan yul rgya lcags ri), receiving the name Sönam Rinchen (bsod nams rin chen)." After becoming a monk in the Kadampa lineage under Geshe Lodan Sherab and focused on studying the Kadampa teachings, in his thirties he sought out and became the foremost student of the yogi Milarepa. Milarepa instructed him in the practice of Vajravārahī, tummo (gtum mo) and Mahāmudrā.

Gampopa's position in the transmission lineage of the Mahamudra teaching is as follows:

1. Tilopa (988-1069), the Indian yogi who experienced the original transmission of the Mahamudra
2. Naropa (1016–1100), who perfected the methods of accelerated enlightenment described in his Six Yogas of Naropa.
3. Marpa (1012–1097), the first Tibetan in the lineage, who translated the Vajrayana and Mahamudra texts into Old Tibetan
4. Milarepa (1040–1123), poet and master who overcame Marpa's reluctance to teach but nonetheless attained enlightenment in a single lifetime
5. Gampopa, Milarepa's most important student, who integrated Atiśa's Kadam teachings and Tilopa's Mahamudra teaching to establish the Kagyü lineage

This lineage sequence, taken together, is called the "Five Founding Masters" by the Kagyu school.

After his studies with Milarepa, Gampopa founded Daklha Gampo Monastery (Dwags lha sgam po) in 1121 CE. He had many great students who were accomplished tantric practitioners, both monks and laymen. Gampopa's teaching joined the Lamrim teachings of the Kadampa school with the Mahamudra and tantric teachings of the Kagyu school. According to Tony Duff, he taught Mahamudra in two approaches, "one is a gradual approach called the Four Yogas of Mahamudra, the other is a sudden approach called Essence Mahamudra."

== Dagpo Kagyu Lineages ==
Gampopa taught extensively, and attracted many students. He is the source of the major surviving Kagyu sub-schools, all known as the Dagpo Kagyu. Following Gampopa, there evolved the so-called "Four Major and Eight Minor" lineages of the Dagpo (sometimes rendered "Tagpo" or "Dakpo") Kagyu School. This phrase is descriptive of the generation or order in which the schools were founded, not of their importance. The four "major" Kagyu schools were those of:

- Barom Kagyu founded by Barompa Darma Wangchug (1127-1194?)
- Phagdru Kagyu founded by Phagmo Drupa Dorje Gyalpo (1110-1170)
- Karma Kagyu, founded by Düsum Khyenpa, 1st Karmapa Lama (1110-1193)
- Tsalpa Kagyu founded by Zhang Yudragpa Tsondru Drag (1123-1193)

The succession of Gampopa's own monastery passed to his nephew, Dakgom Tsültrim Nyingpo (Wylie: dwags sgom tshul khrims snying po, 1116-1169).

== Teachings ==
Gampopa's most famous teaching is known as "The Four Dharmas of Gampopa", this is outlined, for example, in a key text of Gampopa called The Four Dharmas in Brief:

"It is necessary for: dharma to turn to dharma; dharma to turn into the path; the path to dispel confusion; and confusion to turn into wisdom"

The Four Dharmas in Brief further states about each of the four Dharmas:

(1) Dharma to turn to dharma means to meditate on impermanence, the fact that all things will be left behind at death and that only Dharma is of use, all must be renounced except Dharma.

(2) Dharma turns into the path is explained as:

if there is the rational mind of loving kindness and compassion that cherishes other more than oneself-the fictional enlightenment mind-and then on top of that the understanding that all phenomena, outer and inner, appearing as the coming together of interdependency are illusory, then the primal dharma turns into the path.

(3) The Path is to be used to dispel confusion means that "confusion has to be dispelled from top to bottom", Gampopa explains this as follows:

First, meditation on impermanence dispels the confusion of clinging to this life, then meditation on karma and effect dispels the confusion of bad views, then meditation on the disadvantages of cyclic existence dispels the confusion of attachment to cyclic existence, then meditation on loving kindness and compassion dispels the confusion of the Lesser Vehicle, then meditation on appearances being dream-like, illusory, dispels the confusion of grasping at conceived-of things...

(4) Confusion turns into wisdom:

If, the force of meditation done on all phenomena being free from birth and cessation in superfact (paramartha satya) causes whatever appears, whatever is known, to be resolved as its own entity, then confusion has dawned as wisdom.

The doctrine is the subject of several further short texts found in Gampopa's collected works and numerous commentaries by later authors. It also has a close connection to Sachen Kunga Nyingpo's Parting from the Four Attachments.

== Works ==
Gampopa's collected works (known as the Dags po'i Bka' 'bum) were published in Dvag Lha Gampo monastery, but that edition has been lost. There are three main editions extant today:

- An edition made in Hemis Monastery, Ladhak, in the nineteenth century;
- A copy of the above, published in February 1982, in India;
- The Derge wood block edition.

Gampopa's The Jewel Ornament of Liberation (Wylie: dam chos yid bzhin nor bu thar pa rin po che'i rgyan) is one of his most important works, it has been translated into English, first by Herbert Guenther in 1959 and again by Khenpo Konchok Gyeltsen in 1998.

== See also ==
- Shri Singha
- Taklung Monastery

== Notes ==
| Preceded by Milarepa | Kagyu school | Succeeded by Dusum Khyenpa, Phagmo Drupa, Barom Darma Wangchug, Dagpo Gomtsul |
