= Phagmo Drupa Dorje Gyalpo =

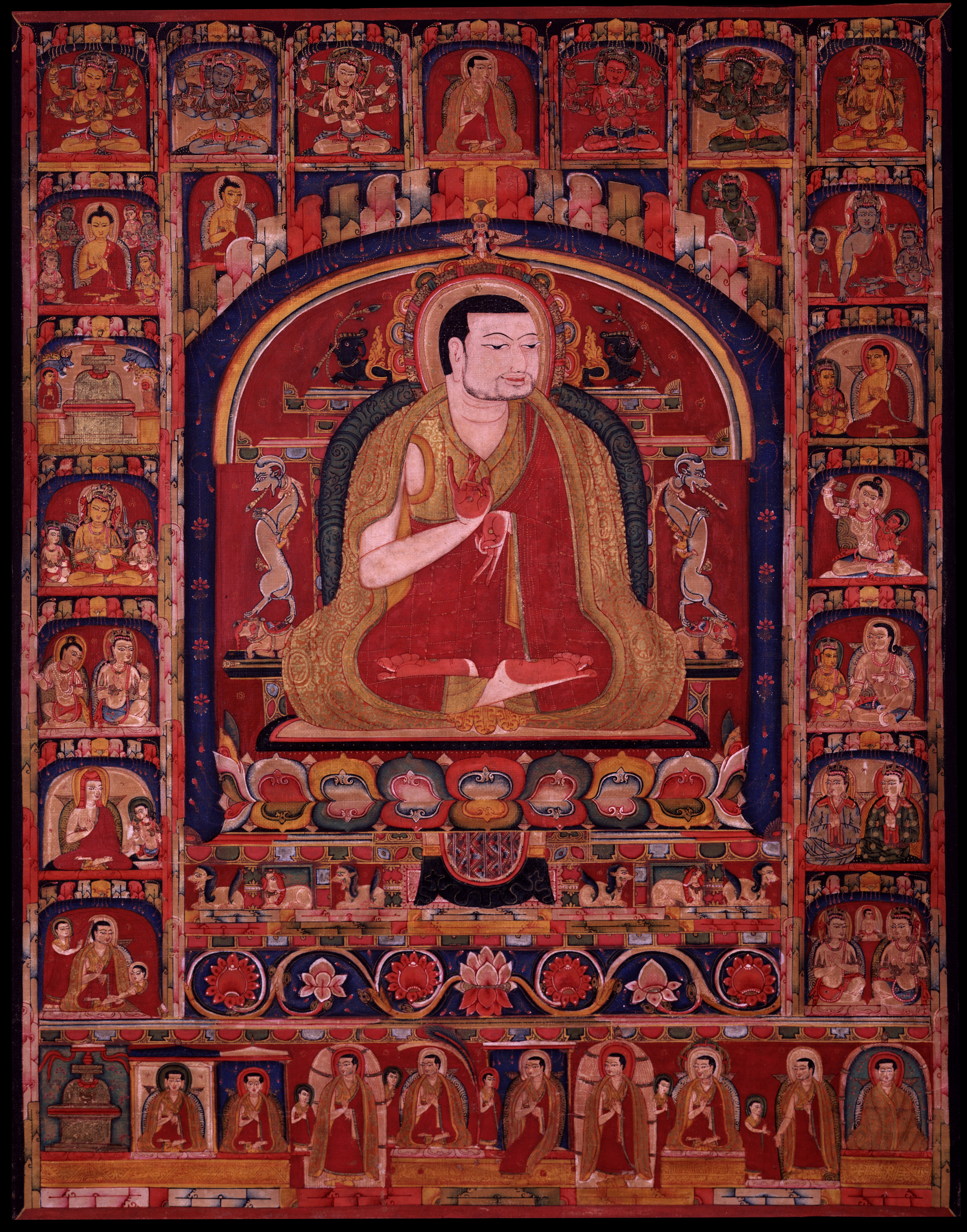
Phagmodrupa with His Previous Incarnations and Episodes from His Life, 14th-century painting from the Rubin Museum of Art

Phagmo Drupa Dorje Gyalpo (Tibetan: ཕག་མོ་གྲུ་པ་རྡོ་རྗེ་རྒྱལ་པོ, Wylie: phag mo gru pa rdo rje rgyal po) [1110–1170], was one of the three main disciples of Gampopa Sonam Rinchen who established the Dagpo Kagyu school of Tibetan Buddhism; and a disciple of Sachen Kunga Nyingpo [1092–1158] one of the founders of the Sakya school of Tibetan Buddhism. He was the elder brother of Kathog Dampa Deshek [1122–1192], who founded Kathog monastery and the Kathog branch of the Nyingma school.

== Biographical details ==
In 1158 Dorje Gyalpo built a hermitage at Phagmo Drupa ("Sow's Ferry Crossing") in a juniper forest in Nêdong (Tibetan: སྣེ་གདོང, Wylie: sne gdong) above the Tsangpo (Brahmaputra) river valley. Later, as his fame spread and disciples gathered, this site developed into the major monastic seat of Dentsa Thel (Tibetan: གདན་ས་ཐེལ, Wylie: gdan sa thel) which was the center of the Phagmo Drupa or Phagdru Kagyu (Tibetan: ཕག་གྲུ་བཀའ་བརྒྱུད) school of Tibetan Buddhism, one of the "four great" Dagpo Kagyu schools.

== The Phagmodrupas ==
After the death of Phagmo Drupa Dorje Gyalpo, his main disciple Jigten Sumgon appointed Chenga Drakpa Jungne as abbot Dentsa Thel. In 1253, when Kublai Khan gave the Sakyapas temporal power in Tibet, Dorje Pel (Tibetan: རྡོ་རྗེ་དཔལ, Wylie: rdo rje dpal) the brother of Chenga Drakpa Jungne was appointed as the hereditary Tripon (myriarch) of the surrounding area of Nêdong. From that time on the Tripon who as a monk, assumed the seat of the local government of Nêdong and also ruled as abbot at Dentsa Thel. Brothers of the Tripon married to perpetuate the family line, succession going from uncle to nephew. As the Tripons of Nêdong were abbots of the monastery founded by Phagmo Drupa, and hierarchs of the Phagdru Kagyu tradition they became known as Phagdru (short of Phagmo Drupa) Tripon.

In 1322 Changchub Gyaltsen (1302–1364) became the Phagdru Myriarch of Nêdong. After he fought with a neighboring myriarchy, the then Sakya ruler of Tibet Ponchen Gyalwa Zangpo dismissed him as myriarch. He later managed to regain his position and eventually overthrew the Sakya rulers – becoming ruler of all of Central Tibet by 1354 (before the Ming dynasty was established in China in 1368). Power remained in the hands of the Phagmodru family until 1434.

== Sources ==
- Dargye, Yonten (2001) History of the Drukpa Kagyud School in Bhutan (12th to 17th Century). Bhutan, 2001 ISBN 99936-616-0-0
- Dorje, Gyurme (1999) Tibet Handbook: The Travel Guide. Footprint 1999. ISBN 1-900949-33-4
- Petech, L. (1990) Central Tibet and The Mongols. (Serie Orientale Roma 65). Rome: Instituto Italiano per il Medio ed Estremo Oriente 1990 85–143
- Roerich, George N. (Translator) (1949) The Blue Annals. Motilal Banarsidass, Delhi 1988.
- Shakapa, Tsepon W.D. (1981)'"The rise of Changchub Gyaltsen and the Phagmo Drupa Period″ in Bulletin of Tibetology, 1981 Gangtok: Namgyal Institute of Tibetology
- Smith, E. Gene. "Golden Rosaries of the Bka' brgyud Schools." in Among Tibetan Texts: History and Literature of the Himalayan Plateau, ed. Kurtis R. Schaeffer, Boston: Wisdom Publications, 2001. ISBN 0-86171-179-3
