= Six Dharmas of Naropa =

Set of Tibetan Buddhist tantric practices

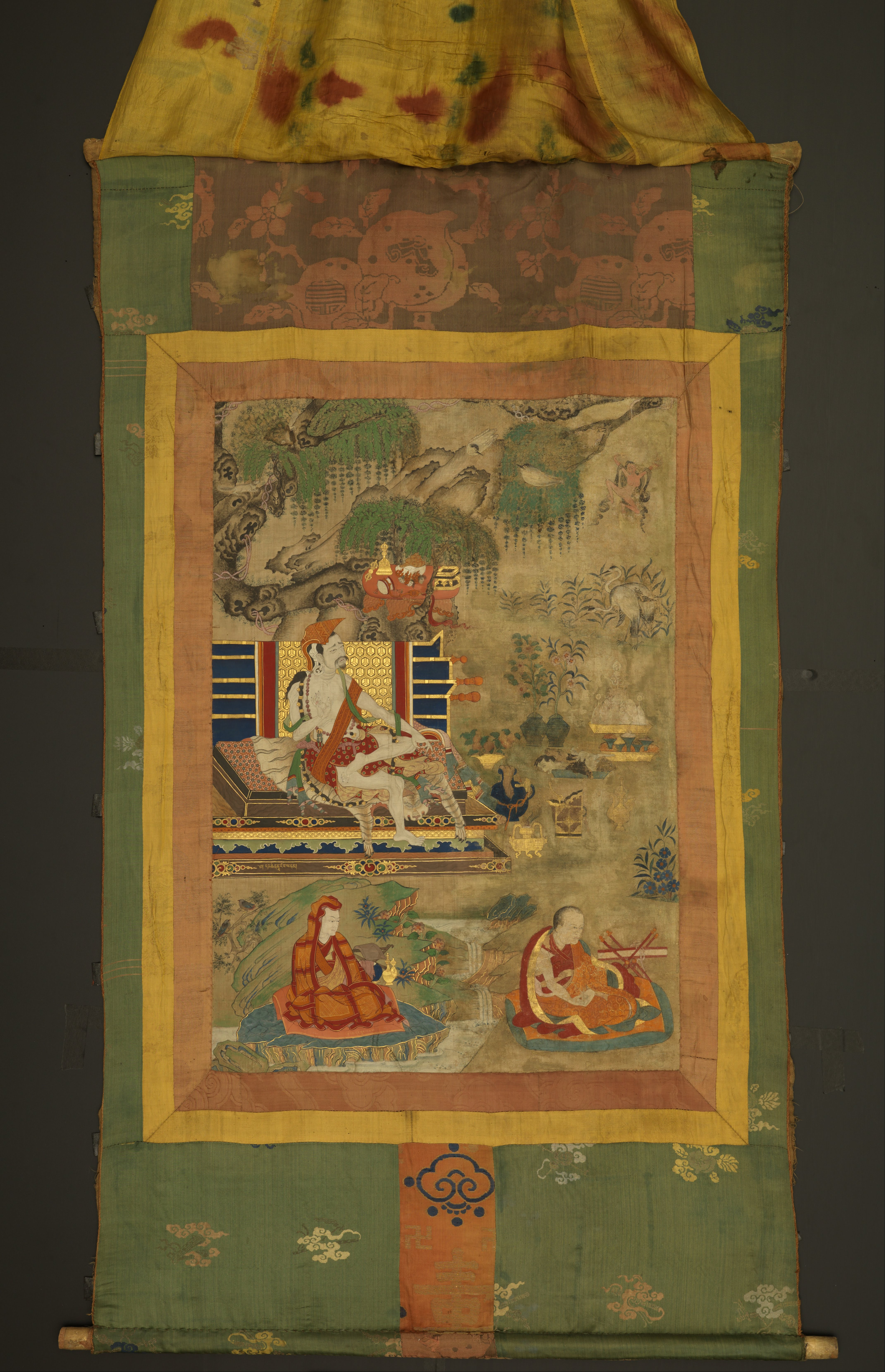
Thangka of Mahasiddha Naropa, 19th century

The Six Dharmas of Nāropa (Wylie: na ro'i chos drug, Skt. ṣaḍdharma, "Naro's six doctrines" or "six teachings") are a set of advanced Tibetan Buddhist tantric practices compiled by the Indian mahasiddhas Tilopa and Nāropa (1016–1100 CE) and passed on to the Tibetan translator-yogi Marpa Lotsawa (c. 1012).

Another name for the six Dharmas is "the oral instruction transmission for achieving liberation in the bardo," or "the Bardo Trang-dol system". Bardo here, refers to the three bardos of waking, sleep and dying. They are also referred to as "the path of means" (thabs lam) in Kagyu literature. They are also sometimes called the Six Yogas of Nāropa (though not in the traditional literature which never uses the term ṣaḍaṅga-yoga or sbyor-drug).

The six dharmas are a collection of tantric Buddhist completion stage practices drawn from the Buddhist tantras. They are intended to lead to Buddhahood in an accelerated manner. They traditionally require tantric initiation and personal instruction through working with a tantric guru as well as various preliminary practices. The six dharmas work with the subtle body, particularly through the generation of inner heat (tummo) energy.

The six dharmas are a main practice of the Kagyu school (and was originally unique to that school) and key Kagyu figures such as Milarepa, Gampopa, Phagmo Drugpa and Jigten Sumgon taught and practiced these dharmas. They are also taught in Gelug, where they were introduced by Je Tsongkhapa, who received the lineage through his Kagyu teachers.

== Lineage ==
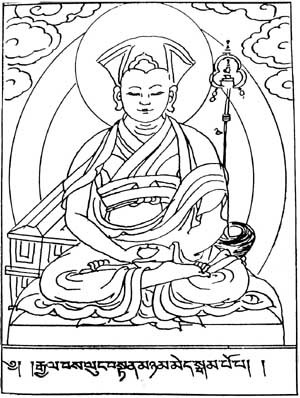
Gampopa, who wrote various meditation manuals on the six dharmas

The teachings of Tilopa (988–1069 CE) are the earliest known work on the six dharmas. He received these from various teachers. According to Glenn Mullin, Tilopa's lineage teachers were the mahasiddhas Nagarjuna (not to be confused with the Madhyamaka philosopher), Lawapa, Luipada, Shavari, and Krishnacharya. Furthermore, the sources for this compilation of tantric practices were said to be the Guhyasamaja Tantra, the Hevajra Tantra and the Chaturpitha Tantra.

Nāropa learned the six dharmas from Tilopa. Nāropa's student Marpa taught the Tibetan Milarepa, renowned for his yogic skills. Milarepa in turn taught Gampopa, who wrote various meditation manuals (khrid chos or khrid yig) on the six dharmas, which are collected in the Dakpö Kambum (The Manifold Sayings of Dakpo) in a section titled "Meditation manuals on the six dharmas of Naropa" (na ro 'i chos drug gi khrid yig). From Gampopa these teachings were passed on to the various Kagyu sub-schools and lineages where they remain a central practice.

Numerous commentaries have been composed on these practices, including Shamar Chokyi Wangchuk's, the Quintessence of Nectar. They are also described in Dakpo Tashi Namgyal's Light Rays from the Jewel of the Excellent Teaching and in Jamgon Kongtrul's Treasury of Knowledge, (book eight, part three). Today, the six dharmas are one of the main tantric practices of the Kagyu school, and are practiced in three-year retreats by monastic and non-monastic yogis.

Through the efforts of Je Tsongkhapa (1357–1419), Naropa's Six Dharmas also became important in the Gelug tradition. Tsongkhapa wrote a commentary on them called A Book of Three Inspirations: A Treatise on the Stages of Training in the Profound Path of Naro's Six Dharmas. This commentary became the standard reference work on these practices in the Gelug tradition. Other figures who wrote on the six dharmas include Gyalwa Wensapa, the First Panchen Lama and Lama Jey Sherab Gyatso.

Many Gelugpa practitioners including the Dalai Lamas and the Panchen Lamas were lineage holders of the six dharmas. Lama Yeshe and Lama Zopa are recent Gelug teachers of the six dharmas.

== Classification ==
The six dharmas are meant to be a comprehensive and holistic collection of the completion stage practices of Indian Buddhist tantra. In Kagyu and Gelug, initiation or empowerment into at least one Anuttarayogatantra system (generally Cakrasaṃvara and/or Vajrayogini/Vajravarāhi Tantras) and practice of its Generation Stage are the bases for practice of the six dharmas. According to Ulrich Timme Kragh,

After having visualized oneself and all other beings as deities and recited the mantras of the deity during the practices associated with the first empowerment, the practitioner uses these techniques of the six yogas, belonging to the second empowerment, to create strong experiences of bliss, presence, and non-thought, thereby providing a first glimpse of Awakening.

=== The Six Dharmas ===
Though variously classified (from just two, to up to ten dharmas), the most widely used list of six dharmas in the work of the Kagyu school figure Gampopa conforms to the following list:

(Tibetan, Wylie transliteration and Sanskrit in parentheses)

- tummo (Tibetan: གཏུམ་མོ་, Wylie: gtum mo; S: caṇḍālī) – the yoga of inner heat (or mystic heat).
- ösel (Tibetan: འོད་གསལ་, Wylie: od gsal; S: prabhasvara) – the yoga of clear light, radiance or luminosity.
- milam (Tibetan: རྨི་ལམ་, Wylie: rmi lam; S: svapnadarśana) – the yoga of the dream state.
- gyulü (Tibetan: སྒྱུ་ལུས, Wylie: sgyu lus; S: māyākāyā) – the yoga of the illusory body.
- bardo (Tibetan: བར་དོ, Wylie: bar do; S: antarābhava) – the yoga of the intermediate state.
- phowa (Tibetan: འཕོ་བ་, Wylie: pho ba; S: saṃkrānti) – the yoga of the transference of consciousness to a pure Buddhafield.

=== Other dharmas ===
Other dharmas, sometimes grouped with those above, or set as auxiliary practices, include:

- Generation Stage practice. According to Thubten Yeshe, Milarepa lists Deity Yoga Generation Stage meditation as part of the dharmas.
- Karmamudrā or "action seal" (Wylie: las kyi phyag rgya, THL: lé kyi chak-gya; erroneously, S: kāmamudrā or "desire seal") .This is the tantric yoga involving sexual union with a consort or partner, either physical or visualized. Like all other yogas, it cannot be practiced without the basis of the tummo and generation stage practice.
- Forceful Transference (drongjuk phowa) – a variation of phowa in which the sādhaka may transfer their mindstream into a recently deceased body.
- Self-liberation – Nāropa himself, in the Vajra Verses of the Whispered Tradition, adds the practice of self-liberation in the wisdom of non-duality, which is the resolved view of Mahamudra. This is always considered as a distinct path.

=== Classifications ===
There are different ways of organizing and listing the dharmas of Naropa other than the list of Gampopa. For example, Tsongkhapa prefers the following listing, which follows Pagmo Drupa: (1) tummo (2) illusory body (3) radiance (4) transference (5) forceful projection and (6) bardo.

The dharmas are also sometimes grouped into different sets of teachings. For example, Gyalwa Wensapa groups them into two dharmas: (1) the yogas for drawing the vital energies into the central channel; and (2) the yogas that are performed once the energies have been withdrawn in this way.

According to Glenn Mullin, "Marpa Lotsawa seems mainly to have spoken of them as fourfold: (1) inner heat; (2) karmamudra, or sex yogas; (3) illusory body; and (4) clear light. Here three of the six-i.e., those of consciousness transference, forceful projection and the bardo yogas-are not given the status of separate "Dharmas," presumably because they are relegated to the position of auxiliary practices." Meanwhile, Milarepa seems to have classified the dharmas of Naropa as follows: (1) generation stage; (2) inner heat; (3) karmamudra; (4) introduction to the essence of the view of the ultimate nature of being; (5) the indicative clear light of the path; and (6) the indicative illusory nature, together with dream yoga.

There is also a list of ten dharmas, which can be found in the work of Ngulchu Dharmabhadra: (1) the generation stage yogas; (2) the view of emptiness; (3) the inner heat; (4) karmamudra yogas; (5) the illusory body; (6) the clear light; (7) dream yoga; (8) the bardo yogas; (9) consciousness transference; and (10) forceful projection.

== Overview of practices ==
=== Preliminaries ===
In all schools of Tibetan Buddhism, there are various preliminary practices drawn from common Mahayana that are prescribed to students before beginning the practice of completion stage yoga (such as taking refuge, bodhicitta aspiration, guru yoga, deity yoga, and dedication of merit). The details of this depend on the lineage, school and individual teacher. For more on this, see: Tibetan Buddhism and Tantra Techniques.

For example, Milarepa is quoted by Tsongkhapa as stating that first one establishes the basics, "such as refuge in the three jewels and the two aspects of bodhicitta." Tsongkhapa also quotes poems by Milarepa which shows that he held that one should first practice contemplating the nature of karma, observing the faults of sensuality and samsara, as well as meditate on kindness and bodhicitta.

Tsongkhapa divides the preliminaries into common and exclusive. The common preliminaries deal with Sutrayana practices such as contemplating karma, impermanence and death, contemplating the shortcomings of sensuality, giving rise to bodhicitta, practicing love (maitri) and compassion (karuna) meditation, keeping the bodhistatva vows, practicing the six perfections, and samatha-vipasyana. This corresponds to the sutra trainings found in Lamrim teachings. According to Tsongkhapa, if one does not practice these, one will not be "able to cut off clinging to the ephemeral things of this life, and as a consequence will not experience a stable aspiration to engage in spiritual practice." Thus, one's practice will "remain superficial," will lack bodhicitta and meditative focus, and thus will also lack insight into not-self.

The exclusive preliminaries are Vajrayana practices such as receiving initiation (the best are Cakrasamvara or Hevajra since they are particularly associated with the six dharmas), keeping one's tantric pledges (samaya), Vajrasattva meditation and guru yoga. Tsongkhapa recommends that one practice generation stage meditation in preparation for the six yogas. According to Glenn Mullin,"it is obvious from Tsongkhapa' s tone that a number of his readers will have heard of practicing the Six Yogas without first having undergone sufficient training in the generation stage meditations." Tsongkhapa argues against this however. Tsongkhapa also writes that one must have an understanding of the doctrine of emptiness.

Similarly, Shamar Chokyi Wangchuk's Quintessence of Nectar states that one must: receive tantric initiation, train in the common preliminaries (such as contemplating one's precious human birth and so on), develop compassion and bodhicitta, practice Vajrasattva purification, and practice guru yoga.

=== Physical exercises ===
There are also auxiliary physical exercises (trül khor) which use various postures (asanas) and movements. There are different traditions of these physical exercises with different sets of exercises. Jey Sherab Gyatso states that some schools practice a set of six exercises, while "The Pakmo Drupa and Drikung Kagyu schools both maintain a tradition of 108 exercises."

The commonly taught "six exercises" are outlined in Phagmo Drukpa's Verses on the Path Technology: A Supplement (Tib. Thabs lam tshigs bead ma'i lhan thabs) as follows:

There are six exercises for purifying the body: filling like a vase; circling like a wheel; hooking like a hook; showing the mudra of vajra binding, lifting upward toward the sky, and then pressing downward; straightening like an arrow, and then forcefully re-leasing the air in the manner of a dog heaving; and, in order to energize the passageways and blood in the body, shaking the head and entire body and flexing the muscles. These are the six.

The first exercise is particularly important, as it is a kumbhaka (vase breathing) breath retention practice, in which one breathes deeply into the navel and holds the breath there for as long as one can. This breath hold technique is also applied in tummo. According to Tsongkhapa, these six are to be done in conjunction with the hollow body contemplation. This practice will allow one to feel much joy, and also will help prevent any injury which might arise from the changing flow of the vital winds resulting from the practice of the six yogas. A related practice is the visualization on the body as being hollow: "here the body and the energy channels (nadis) are to be seen as completely transparent and radiant". This technique releases tension and gives suppleness to the subtle energy channels. Tsongkhapa describes this practice as follows:

One commences as before with the practice of visualizing oneself as the mandala deity. The special application here is to concentrate on the body, from the tip of the head to the soles of the feet, as being utterly empty of material substance, like an empty transparent balloon filled with light...Here the body is to be envisioned as being entirely without substance, appearing in the mind like a rainbow in the sky.

=== Inner heat ===
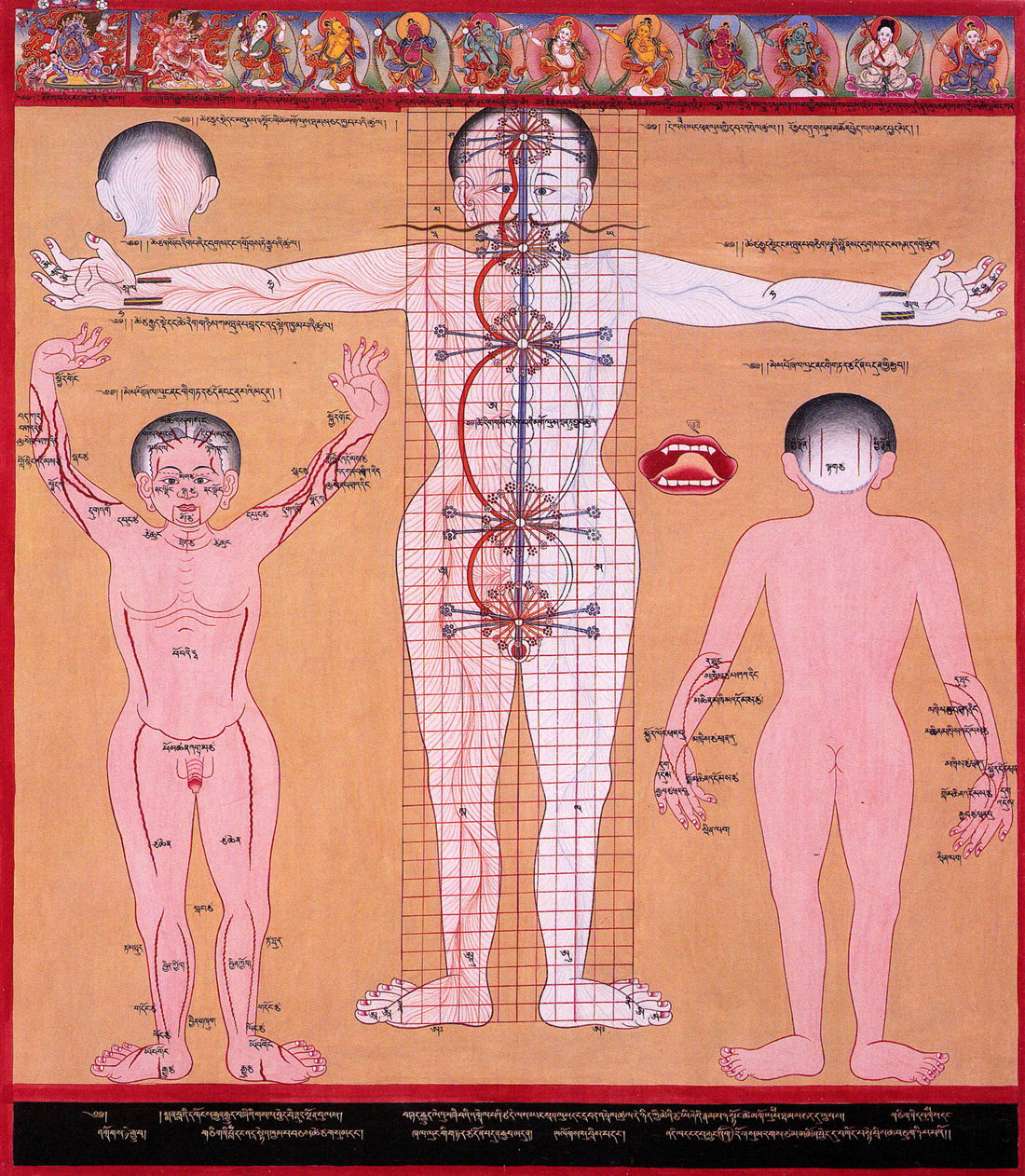
A Tibetan illustration depicting the central channel and the two side channels as well as five chakras where the channels loop around each other

Inner heat (gtum mo, skt. chandali, literally meaning "fierce, hot or savage woman") practice is the foundation for the rest of the six dharmas and is the first of the six dharmas. This practice works with the subtle body (also known as the vajra-body) system of channels (nadis), winds (lung, vayu), drops (bindus) and chakras. Through inner heat, the vital winds are caused to enter into the central channel (avadhuti), causing the four blisses or joys which is then unified with the wisdom that understands emptiness.

This practice is a kind of pranayama, that generally involves sitting with a straight back, visualizing the channels, holding the breath deep in the abdomen for extended periods (called "vase breath", kumbhaka), then applying visualization of a fiery short stroke AH syllable on the navel. This practice leads the vital winds into the central channel, where they are said to melt the drops (bindus, which are tiny spheres of subtle energy) causing great bliss. This powerful bliss experience "is said to constitute a similitude of the actual bliss experienced in spiritual Awakening (byang chub, *bodhi)."

According to Glenn Mullin, tantric scriptures state that the tantric bliss experienced in this practice is "a hundred times more intense than ordinary sexual orgasm, [and] gives rise to a special state of consciousness." This ecstatic state of mind is then used to contemplate emptiness. This "ecstasy conjoined with (the wisdom of) emptiness" is what is referred to as Mahamudra (The Great Seal).

Tilopa's verses of the six dharmas briefly outlines the practice as follows:

The yogic body, a collection of energy channels, coarse and subtle, possessing the energy fields, is to be brought under control. The method begins with the physical exercises. The vital airs [i.e., energies] are drawn in, filled, retained and dissolved. There are the two side channels, the central channel avadhuti, and the four chakras. Flames rise from the chandali fire at the navel. A stream of nectar drips down from the syllable HAM at the crown, invoking the four joys. There are four results, like that similar to the cause, and six exercises that expand them.

==== Gampopa's presentation ====
Ulrich Timme Kragh outlines the progression of this practice from one of Gampopa's manuals, titled Closely Stringed Pearls. After describing the visualization of the three channels, the text outlines the four chakras which are to be visualized along the central channel with various spokes radiating out of each chakra like an open umbrella. The four chakras described by Gampopa are:

- At the navel, there is the emanation-cakra with 64 spokes.
- At the heart, there is the Dharmacakra with 8 spokes.
- In the throat, there is the enjoyment-cakra with 16 spokes.
- At the top of the head, there is the great-bliss-cakra with 32 spokes.

Kragh outlines the practice as follows:

it is instructed that the practitioner should hold the breath below the navel to make the A-letter flare up like a flame, the fire reaching so high that the flames strike the letter Ham visualized in the great-bliss-cakra. This causes an energy called bodhicitta (byang sems), which is stored in this cakra, to trickle down through the central channel. As it fills up the different cakras on its way down, it generates different experiences of bliss. After reaching and filling the navel-cakra, the bodhicitta is visualized as flowing back up, while yogi continues to use the gtum mo breathing technique of holding the breath for as long as possible in the abdomen. At the end of the practice, the practitioner stops visualizing (yid la mi byed) the channels, winds, and drops, and instead rests in an uncontrived state of Mahamudra (phyag rgya chen po ma bcos pa'i ngang).

Another meditation manual by Gampopa also mentions a practice that relies on visualizing a drop (thig le, *bindu) between the eyebrows. This bindu descends and ascends through the central channel, spreading a sensation of bliss-emptiness along the way. Regarding post-meditation, the yogi is "instructed to train in experiencing all sensory impressions as blissful and to maintain a constant sense of inner heat and the soothing, cooling bliss of the descending bodhicitta. It is said that the experience of everything as being blissful will automatically give rise to the experience of non-thought (mi rtog pa, *nirvikalpa)."

==== Gelug presentation ====
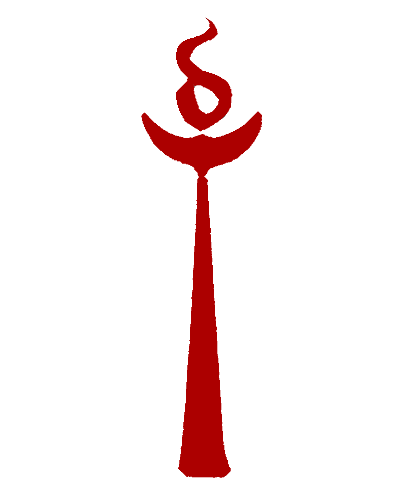
The Ah stroke syllable as taught in Gelug

In Tsongkhapa's system, inner heat is the foundation stone for the whole six dharmas (along with meditation on emptiness). Every time one practices one of this six dharmas, one must first generate inner heat, along with the four blisses and merge this with meditation on emptiness. Once mastered, tummo is then applied to the practice of illusory body, and based on illusory body yoga, one practices radiance/clear light yoga.

Tsongkhapa's commentary "The Three Inspirations," divides the practice of inner heat into three main components:

- Meditating on the channels; one first visualizes the three channels (right is red, left is white and central channel is blue) and then the four chakras at the crown (multicolored with 32 petals), throat (red with 16 petals), heart (white with 6 petals) and below the navel (red with 64 petals). One fixes the mind on each chakra and with practice they become increasingly clear. If this is too difficult, one can just meditate on the channels first, or on the point where they meet below the navel. The goal is to achieve a stable clarity of the radiant appearance of the channels and chakras for a prolonged period of time. One can also join this practice with the vase breathing exercise (i.e. kumbhaka) and with the hollow body visualization.

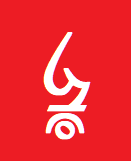
Upside down Tibetan script Haṃ seed syllable

- Meditating on mantric seed syllables on the center of each chakra; Tsongkhapa states: "one should concentrate on the syllables of the upper three chakras for just a short period of time, and then dedicate most of the session to meditating on the Ah-stroke at the navel chakra." The other syllables are: An upside down white Haṃ at the crown chakra, an upside down blue Hūṃ ཧཱུྃ at the heart chakra, a red Oṃ ཨོཾ at the throat chakra. The seed syllables should be visualized as tiny like the size of a mustard seed, though Tsongkhapa states that one can start imagining them as larger than that and then shrink them.
- Meditation on the chakras, syllables and channels joined with the vase breathing technique. To practice vase breath, breathe a long deep breath through the nose. Then swallow and press down with the abdomen. Retains the air for as long as possible. Then one releases the breath gently and quietly. According to Tsongkhapa, until some progress has been made in this practice, one should practice gently without forcefulness. There should be no discomfort. One should also practice on an empty stomach.

Tsongkhapa describes the outcome of the full method (with all three elements described above practiced at once) as follows:

Then the energies residing in the chakra at the secret place cause the AH-stroke syllable at the navel chakra, which is in nature the inner fire, to blaze with light. This light rises up the central channel avadhuti and melts the other three syllables, HAM, OM and HUM [respectively at the crown, throat and heart chakras]. These melt and fall into the syllable AH [at the navel chakra]. The four become of one inseparable nature. One then fixes the mind on the drop [formed by this fusion], the nature of which is the innate ecstasy. If one can do so, then from the drop comes the tongue of a tiny flame of the inner heat. One fixes the mind on it. Light from this flame rises up the central channel, where it melts the drop of white bodhimind substance abiding within the crown chakra. This drips down like nectar, filling the AH-stroke mantric syllable at the navel chakra. One meditates single-pointedly on the AH-stroke, until the signs of stability arise. When meditative stability has been achieved then the radiance of the light from the inner fire will illuminate the inside and outside of one's body, as well as one's dwelling place and so forth, rendering them as transparent as a piece of kyurura fruit held in the hand.

This practice will cause the vital winds to enter the central channel. Tsongkhapa describes various signs that this has occurred, mainly that the breath flows smoothly and evenly through the nostrils, then it becomes increasingly subtle, and then it stops altogether.

Tummo practice is also said to generate the four blisses. Tsongkhapa explains that the first bliss arises when the energy drop in the crown chakra is melted when the vital winds are brought to the crown by tummo. When the energies reach the throat, this is the second bliss ("supreme bliss"), when they reach the heart, the third bliss arises ("special bliss") and when they reach the navel, the fourth "innate bliss" arises. If one can hold the mind at the chakras for extended periods, one will gain the ability to control the movement of the energy drops. Then one can also bring the drop back up the central channel, experiencing the blisses again but starting from the navel chakra. One then continues to practice by moving the drop up and down the central channel, experiencing the four descending and the four rising blisses again and again.

To meditate on innate wisdom, one lets the drop melt all the way down to the chakra at the secret place ("tip of the jewel"). Then one meditates on emptiness and rests in that ecstasy - emptiness meditation. Then one brings the drop back to the crown chakra, which meditates on "the sphere of ecstasy conjoined with emptiness."

Tsongkhapa further states: "During the post-meditation periods one must consciously cultivate mindfulness of the experience of ecstasy and emptiness, and stamp all objects and events that appear and occur with the seal of this ecstasy and emptiness. This application causes a special ecstasy to be ignited, which one should foster."

=== Karmamudrā ===
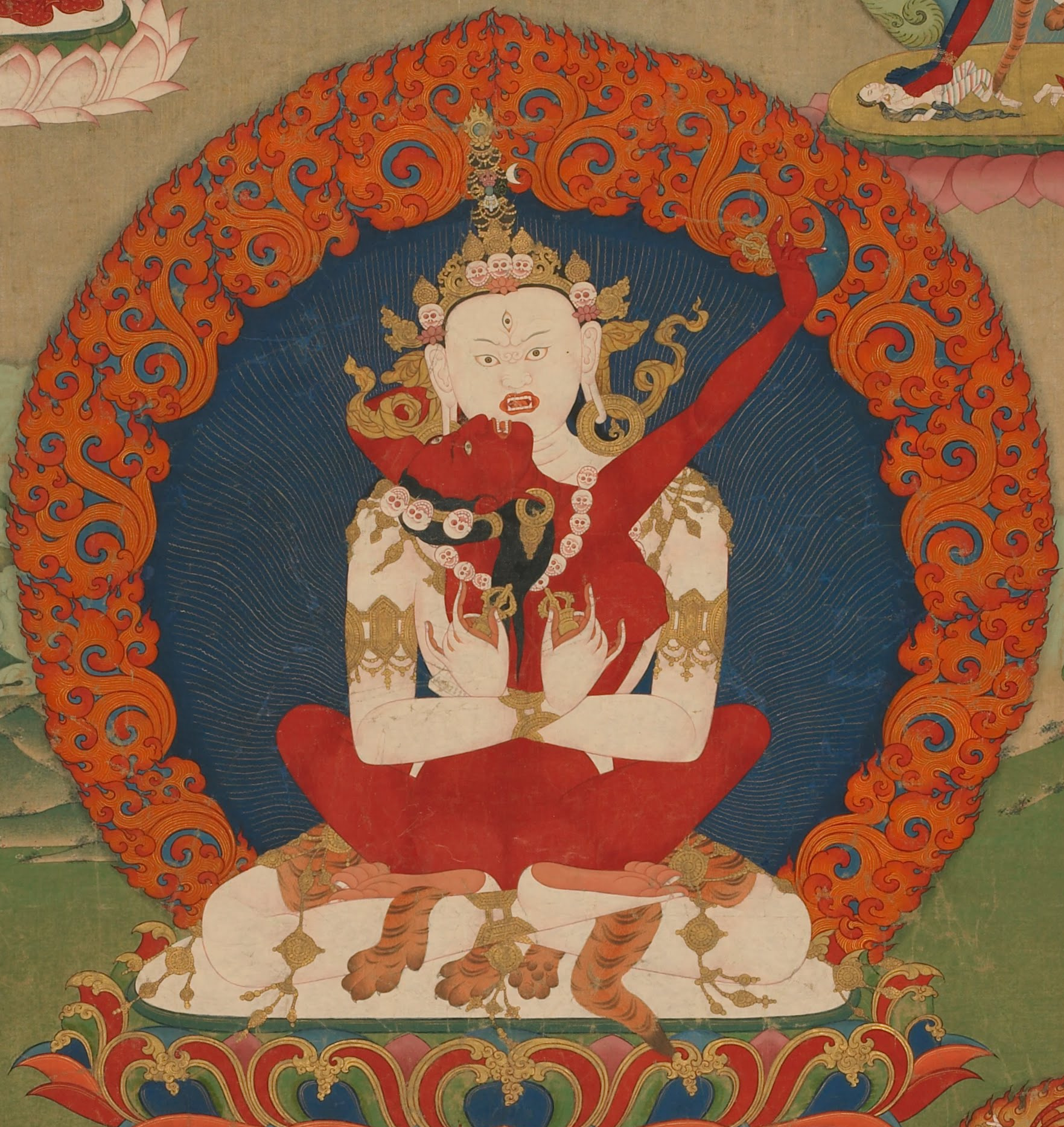
Saṃvara in union with his consort the wisdom dakini Vajravārāhī

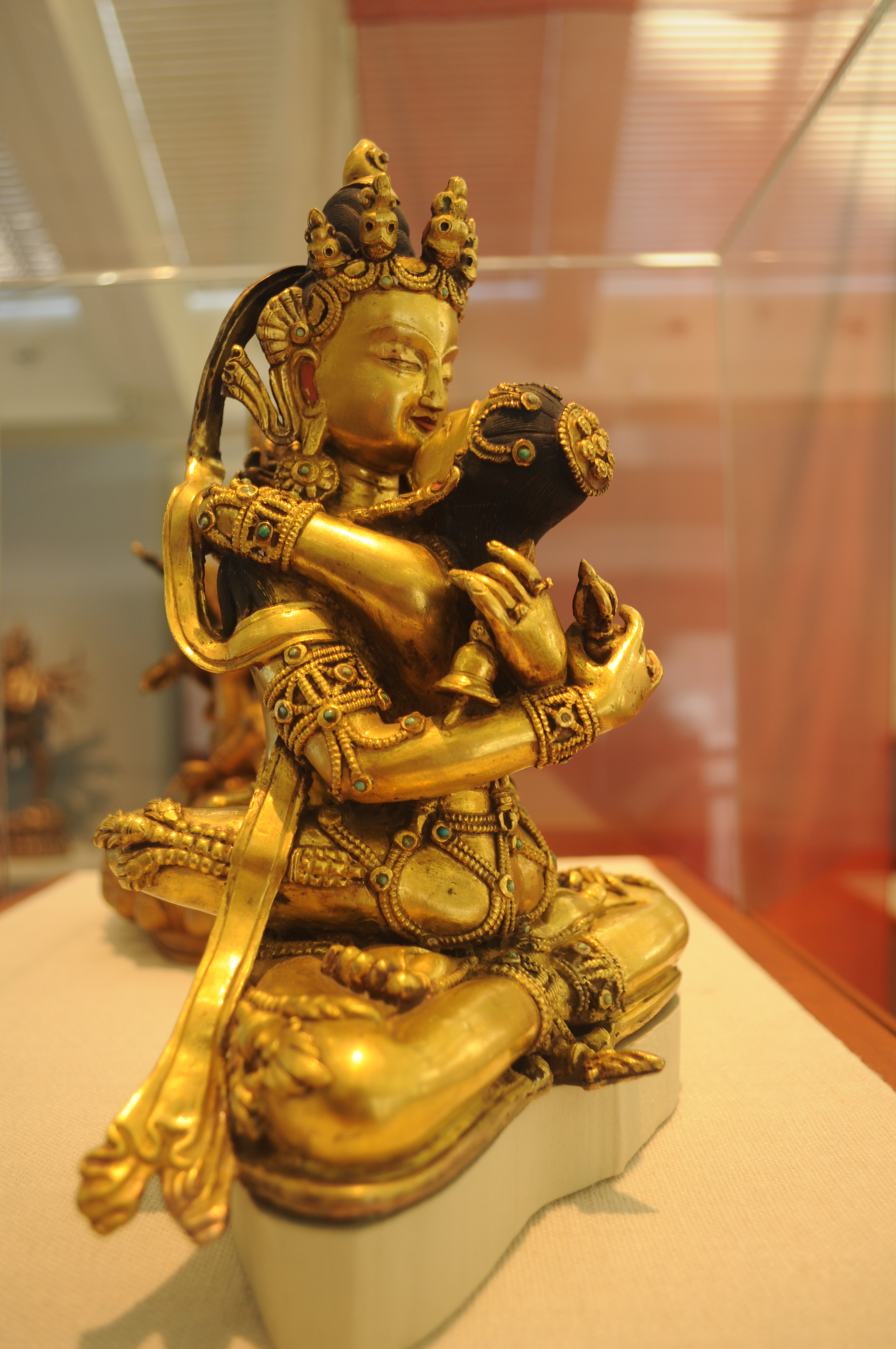
Vajradhara (Dorjechang, Vajra-holder) in union with his consort, Prajnaparamita, Tibet, 19th century

The practice of inner heat is closely related to the practice of karmamudrā (las kyi phyag rgya, action seal), referring to meditative sexual union which leads to the four blisses and is practiced along with inner heat yoga. In some lists, such as that of Milarepa, it is listed as a separate dharma. In other systems, such as that of Gampopa, it is listed as a subset of inner heat yoga. This is because it is considered necessary to have control over the vital energies (through inner heat yoga) in order to be successful in karmamudrā.

There are various classifications of action seal, karmamudrā (action seal) is a regular human sexual consort, while jñānamudrā (wisdom seal) is a deity consort created through the power of one's visualization. In Tibetan Buddhism, it is rare for this practice to be done with an actual person, and most commonly it refers to an imagined consort (which will be a buddhist tantric deity, i.e. a yidam).

According to Ulrich Timme Kragh, in the writings of Gampopa, the six dharmas are associated with the second empowerment, while action seal practice is associated with the third empowerment. As such, action seal practice "represents a stage of practice that may be performed after having perfected the yogas of the Six Dharmas."

According to Tsongkhapa, both practitioners of physical action seal yoga should be of the highest capacity, have tantric initiations, be learned in tantra and be able to keep the pledges (samaya), be skilled in the practice of the tantric sadhana and be mature in practicing four daily sessions of yoga. They should also be skilled in meditation on emptiness and in the techniques of inducing the four blisses. Tsongkhapa states that if they do not have these qualities, practicing physical sexual yoga is unwise. In this case, one should just practice with a visualized consort.

While many of the traditional lists of types of consorts to seek out for joint practice to gain spiritual attainments are written for males and from a male point of view, there are some rare instructions for these sadhanas and for consort choice from the point of view of female practitioners.

==== Gampopa's presentation ====
Kragh provides the following overview of the practice (from a male perspective) found in Gampopa's A Mirror Illuminating the Oral Transmission:

Sitting still in sexual union, he should create an upwards movement of his breath while meditating on the sound of a certain mantric syllable. This will give rise to four levels of joy, i.e., sexual arousal. While experiencing these, he should concentrate on the nature of his mind. Thereupon, he performs the practice of Inner Heat, whereby the wind element dissolves into the fire element giving rise to the dissolution sign of 'smoke' (rtags du ba). The white bodhicitta (byang sems, i.e., semen) then descends from the crown of his head to the penis (rdo rje nor bu, *vajraratna). At this point, the male yogi must remain in a meditative state without ejaculating any semen, thereby causing the water element to dissolve into the fire element, which produces the mirage-like sign (rtags smig sgyu lta bu). When the flow of bodhicitta has reached the very tip of the penis (rdo rje rtse mo, *vajrasekhara), the male yogi must reverse its flow back up to the crown of his head. Thereby, the water element dissolves into the earth element, causing the lamp-like sign (rtags mar me lta bu) to appear. When this experience has become very steady and the firefly-like sign has appeared, that constitutes the perfection of tranquility meditation (gzhi nas, *samatha), equivalent to the meditative concentration (*samadhi) of the first level of absorption (bsam gtan dang po, *prathamadhyana). Interrupting this absorption, the yogi should then train in insight meditation (lhag mthong, *vipasyana). That is here done by means of a visualization focusing on a small ball of light (thig le, *bindu) in the heart-cakra, which gradually turns into an experience of radiance and emptiness (’od gsal stong pa nyid). Thereby, the sign which is like a cloudless sky appears (sprin med pa'i nam mkha' lta bu'i rtags) and the yogi realizes the selflessness of all phenomena to be like the ungraspable center of the sky.

=== Radiance yoga ===
Luminosity, radiance or clear light (Skt. prabhāsvaratā; Tib.’od gsal) refers to the clear radiant nature the mind, which is associated with buddha-nature. It is said to be experienced during various events in one's life, such as orgasm, sleep, dreaming and in the dying - rebirth process.

Tilopa's oral instructions explain this practice as follows:

The yogi working with the central channel places the mind in the central channel and fixes concentration on the drop at the heart. Visions arise, like lights, light-rays, rainbows, the sunlight and moonlight at dawn, the sun, the moon, and then the appearances of deities and forms. In this way the myriads of worlds are purified.

Gampopa's Closely Stringed Pearls explains that this practice is to be done while falling asleep by initially setting an intention to "seize the radiance" (’od gsal zin par bya). Then the yogi visualizes five syllables in the heart-cakra. As sleep sets in, the yogi slowly shifts their attention from one syllable to the other. If one is successful in capturing the radiance or luminosity, a syllable Hum (ཧཱུྃ) will appear vividly in the heart, radiating powerful light and one will experience blissful sleep (and not the dream state, if one dreams, one has failed to capture the radiance). After waking up, it will appear as if one is in a strong glow.

==== Gelug presentation ====
In Tsongkhapa's exposition, there are various types of radiance or clear light. One is found in Mahayana sutras and in tantras, but there is an extraordinary radiance which is unique to tantra. The extraordinary radiance exclusive to highest yoga tantra is reached through inner heat practice and illusory body yoga joined with meditation on emptiness. This radiance, also termed "primordial wisdom of ecstasy and emptiness," is the focus of the system of six dharmas. Mullin (2005), p. 82. Tsongkhapa divides the practice of radiance into waking and sleep practices.

The practice of radiance in the waking state involves visualizing oneself as the deity in sexual union and meditating on a blue HUM at the heart chakra which emanates light in all directions that purifies the universe. One dissolves the world into light and into oneself as the deity, then one dissolves into the mantric syllable HUM in one's heart chakra. The HUM then melts into light from the bottom up and one focuses the mind on the heart chakra. Then one practices collecting the vital winds into the central channel with the tummo method explained previously, which melts the drops, leading to the four blisses and the four emptinesses. One then experiences the dissolution of the elements and corresponding visions (see below), and then the radiance arises. One then joins the mind of radiance with meditation on emptiness.

Gyalwa Wensapa, in his A Source of Every Realization, outlines how one practices generation stage and then tummo to generate the radiance yoga. First one imagines oneself as the Buddha Vajradhara in sexual union with a consort, and then one visualizes the channels and chakras. Then one generates inner heat and meditates on the melting of the drops, which leads to the entry of the winds in the central channel and their dissolution. There are various signs which indicate that the winds have entered and dissolved, mainly that one has visions of the dissolution of the elements and the visions which indicate the "four emptinesses" followed by the clear light/radiance experience. These visions are as follows:

Earth dissolves into water, and there is a vision like seeing a mirage; water dissolves into fire, and there is a smoke-like vision; fire dissolves into air, and there is a vision like flickering fireflies. Then the air element begins to dissolve into the visionary consciousness called "appearance." There is a vision like that of the glow of a butterlamp. Air fully dissolves into "appearance," and there is a vision of whiteness, like a clear autumn sky pervaded by the light of the full moon. This dissolves into the consciousness known as "proximity," and there is a vision of redness, like that of the clear sky pervaded by sunlight. This dissolves into "proximate attainment," and there is a vision of overwhelming darkness, like the sky before dawn, with neither sun nor moon. "Proximate attainment" then dissolves into the clear light; there is a vision of clear radiance, like the sky at daybreak, free from the three conditions. One must recognize these experiences as they occur. This is the process known as "blending with Dharmakaya during the waking state."

Regarding the sleep practice of clear light, one first practices generation stage yoga and guru yoga, making prayers to the guru. Then one sets a firm resolution to recognize the clear light of sleep that arises before dreaming. Then one lies on the right side in the lion posture and visualizes oneself as the deity. One visualizes a blue four-petalled lotus at the heart chakra and the central channel running through it, with a blue HUM at the center (one can use just the HUM, or the HUM plus AH NU TA RA placed in the petals as well). The focusing of the mind in the central channel at the heart causes the winds to enter, which leads to the process of dissolution and the visions described above. Then when clear light arises like the sky at daybreak, one rests the mind in that state and retains it as long as one can without lapsing into a dream or waking up.

=== Dream yoga ===
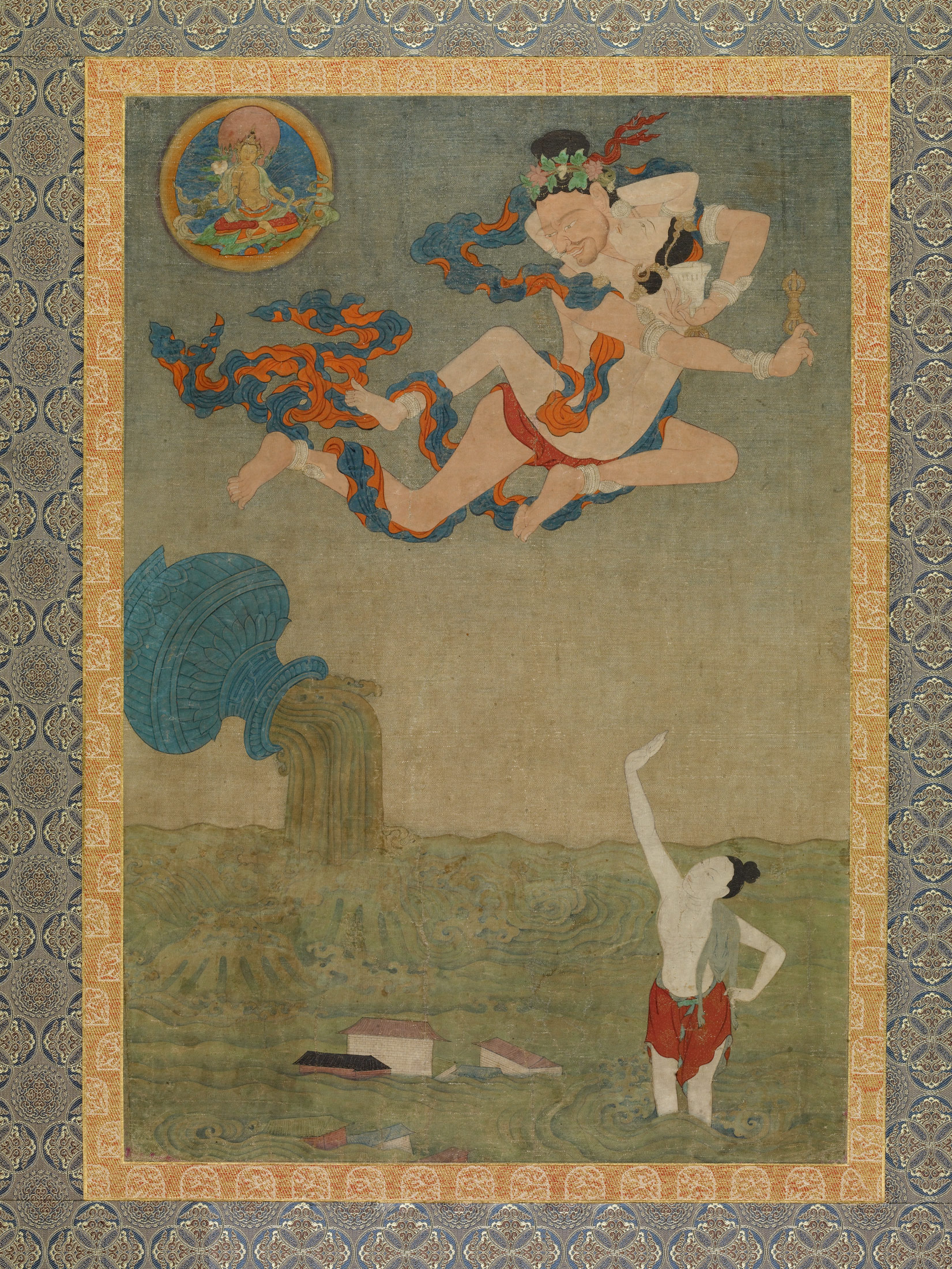
Mahasiddha Ghantapa, from Situ Panchen's set of thangka depicting the Eight Great Tantric Adepts. 18th century.

In the yoga of dreaming (rmi lam, *svapna), the yogi learns to remain aware during the states of dreaming (i.e. to lucid dream) and uses this skill to practice yoga in the dream.

Tilopa's oral instructions state:

Know dreams as dreams, and constantly meditate on their profound significance. Visualize the seed syllables of the five natures with the drop, the nada and so forth. One perceives buddhas and buddhafields. The time of sleep is the time for the method that brings realization of great bliss. This is the instruction of Lawapa.

==== Gampopa's presentation ====
Gampopa's Closely Stringed Pearls outlines four main sequential steps:

- Seizing the dream – Becoming lucid in the dream. First, the yogi must see all perceptions and thoughts as a dream during the day. Then, they must go to sleep lying on their right side, with strong determination to recognize they are dreaming within the dream. This can be done by stating at least seven or up to twenty-one times that the dreams will be recognized as dreams. They visualize a lotus flower with five syllables that radiate gentle light in the throat chakra and slowly shift their awareness from one syllable to another while falling asleep. This should spontaneously produce the experience of lucid dreaming. In another meditation manual by Gampopa, A Mirror Illuminating the Oral Transmission, one is instructed to visualize a sphere of light in between the eyebrows instead.
- Training – According to Kragh, "The yogi is here instructed to think of whatever dream arises as being merely a dream and to relate to it without any fear. If he dreams of water, he should plunge into it or walk across it. He should jump into an abyss or sit down to be bitten by dream-dogs or beaten by dream enemies. He should fly in air, visit the god realms, or go sight-seeing in India."
- Blessing as illusory and getting rid of fear – Here, the yogi checks their mind during the dream to see if there is even the slightest fear, and if so, they should let go of it by recognizing that they are only in a dream. Once they've mastered the feeling of complete unobstructedness, they have "blessed their dreams as illusory" (sgyu ma byin gyis brlabs pa).
- Meditating on reality – The yogi meditates on reality by "analyzing that all states of dream consciousness are his own mind which is unborn (rang gi sems skye ba med pa). If such a contemplation of Mahamudra did not occur during the night, the yogi should direct his focus on the syllables again in the morning after waking up and then rest in the state of Mahamudra."

Another meditation manual by Gampopa also explains how the yogi should attempt to see Buddhas and dakinis giving them teachings in their dreams, and how this gives rise to blessing. It also recommends to practice kumbhaka breathing before sleep.

==== Gelug presentation ====
In Tsongkhapa's system, it is necessary to become acquainted with the tummo, radiance/clear light and illusory body practices before practicing dream yoga (which he sees as an extension of illusory body yoga). According to Tsongkhapa, before practicing dream yoga, one must first master the yoga of retaining the radiance/clear light that arises at the moment of falling asleep (through experiencing the visions etc.) as explained above. If one practices this before sleep, when a dream occurs, one will realize that one is in a dream.

Dream yoga in Tsongkhapa's system consists of four trainings: "learning to retain [conscious presence during] dreams; controlling and increasing dreams; overcoming fear and training in the illusory nature of dreams; and meditating upon the suchness of dreams."

Dream yoga practice begins by first acquiring the skill to recognize one is dreaming within the dream. If one is not successful in recognizing one's dream through the practice of retaining the radiance of sleep,"one should cultivate a strong resolution to retain conscious awareness in the dream state. In addition, one meditates on the chakras, especially that at the throat." If one can make this resolution to recognize one's dream strong and continuous throughout the day, one will be able to recognize one's dream. One can also practice the visualization meditations on the throat and forehead chakras during the day so as to enhance one's ability at night. One may also meditate upon oneself as the deity, and on guru yoga, offering prayers so that one may experience clear dreams.

Tsongkhapa mentions various meditations to be done before falling asleep. In the first one, one generates a vision of oneself as the deity as well as a vision of one's guru, and prays to the guru to recognize the dream and so forth. Then one visualizes a small red four petaled lotus in the throat chakra, with an Ah or Om in the center. He mentions that in another tradition, it is taught that one meditates on five syllables (OM, AH, NU, TA, RA), with one at the center and the other four around it. One focuses on each of these in succession. The second method is to pray as before, and meditate on a white radiant drop the size of a mustard seed between the eyebrows. Then one performs vase breath seven times and goes to sleep.

One can also meditate on the heart chakra before sleep. According to Tsongkhapa, if one finds it too difficult to recognize one is dreaming, then this means one is a deep sleeper, and thus one should switch to the crown chakra. This will lighten one's sleep. If this makes sleep difficult however, then one can focus on the chakra at the tip of the penis and unites the vital winds there 21 times through kumbhaka.

Once one has recognized the dream, one can begin to learn to control it. One first practices controlling basic elements such as flying, going to the heavens, traveling to buddhafields etc. One can also train in "increasing", i..e multiplying dream objects, including one's body, into numerous duplicates. The practice of controlling the vital winds will enhance one's ability to control the dream. When the yogi has gained these skills, he should transform himself into the Patron Buddha body, and transform the things that he is seeing in his dreams into different objects. Next to that, supernatural powers should be practised in the dreaming state. With gaining all these skills, the yogi can eventually reach the Buddha's Pure Land and listen to the Buddha's preachings.

The next step is training in becoming fearless by doing anything that might kill a person in the non-dream world, such as jumping into water or fire. One can use this to meditate on the empty nature of dreams and to recognize their illusory nature.

Finally, one meditates on suchness in the dream. One visualizes oneself as the deity, with a HUM at the heart, radiating light everywhere. This light melts everything in the dream into light, which is drawn into the HUM. One's body also melts and is drawn into the HUM. Then the HUM dissolves into radiance/clear light, and one rests in the state of radiance.

=== Illusory body ===
The practice of the illusory body is a kind of contemplation on the illusory nature (maya) of phenomena. Tilopa's oral instructions state:

All animate and inanimate things of the three worlds are like the examples of an illusion, a dream and so forth. See this at all times, both in movement and in stillness. Contemplate an illusory deity reflected in a mirror; take a drawn image of Vajrasattva, and consider how the reflected image vividly appears. Just as that image is an illusory appearance, so it is with all things. The yogi thus contemplates the twelve similes and sees the reality of how all things are illusory. This is the instruction of [the mahasiddha] Nagarjuna.

==== Gampopa's presentation ====
According to Gampopa's Closely Stringed Pearls, the practice of Illusory Body (sgyu lus, *mayadeha or *mayakaya) is done by assuming a meditative posture and meditating by looking at one's body in a mirror, contemplating how it has an illusory nature. According to Kragh, "He should then speak to himself, voicing many self-criticisms and check whether he feels any unhappiness or expressing praises and see whether he feels pleased. As long as such emotions arise, he has not trained himself sufficiently in the practice. Once no emotion occurs, he should contemplate all appearances of himself and everything else as having a hallucinatory and dream-like quality." Another meditation manual by Gampopa states that one should meditate on reality as being dreamlike before doing the mirror practice.

In a second phase of this practice, a yogi hangs a picture of his chosen deity behind them so that its image appears in a mirror placed in front. Then the yogi scolds or praises the image as his self-reflection and sees if there is any emotional response. When there is no response, the yogi contemplates the illusory (maya) nature of themselves and the reflection, feeling that everything is essenceless like the deity's body. This instruction is said to be a postmeditative practice and thus may have meant to be practiced in-between sessions of regular sitting meditation.

==== Gelug presentation ====
In the Gelug system, to give rise to the illusory body, one must first practice the previous dharmas of generation stage, inner heat, karmamudra and radiance/clear light. One begins by practicing inner heat and karmamudra, then going through the stages of the dissolution of the elements, and meditating until radiance and the four blisses arise. Then one uses this radiant blissful mind to meditate on emptiness and rest single pointedly in that non-conceptual absorption.

Regarding post meditation, Tsongkhapa states that in times of the day when one is not meditation, "one maintains awareness of the vision of emptiness, and recollects the previous meditation on transforming all appearances into the mandala and its deities." This will lead all appearances to arise as illusions.

=== Transference of consciousness ===
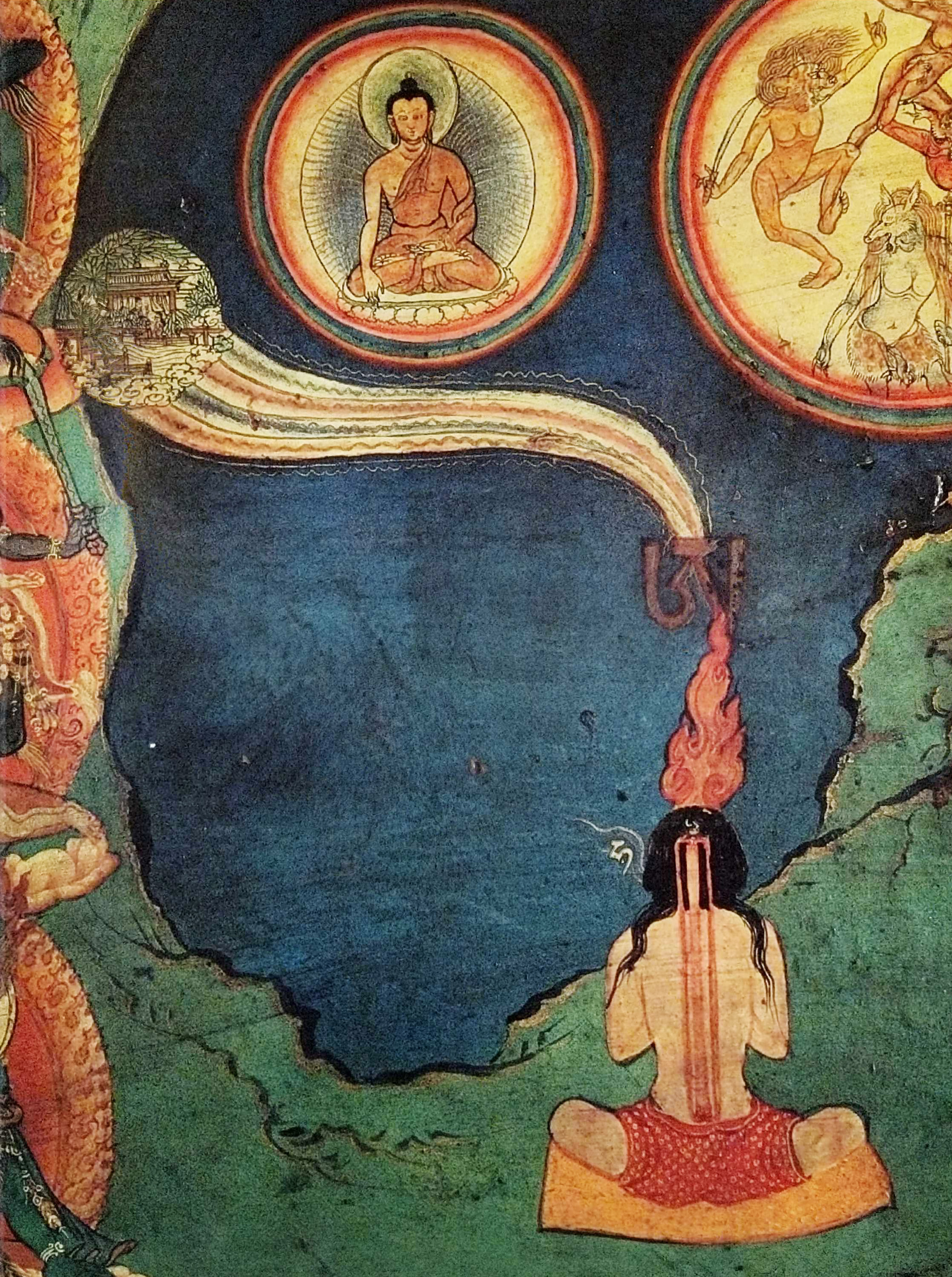
A section of the Northern wall mural at the Lukhang Temple depicting tummo, the three channels (nadis) and phowa

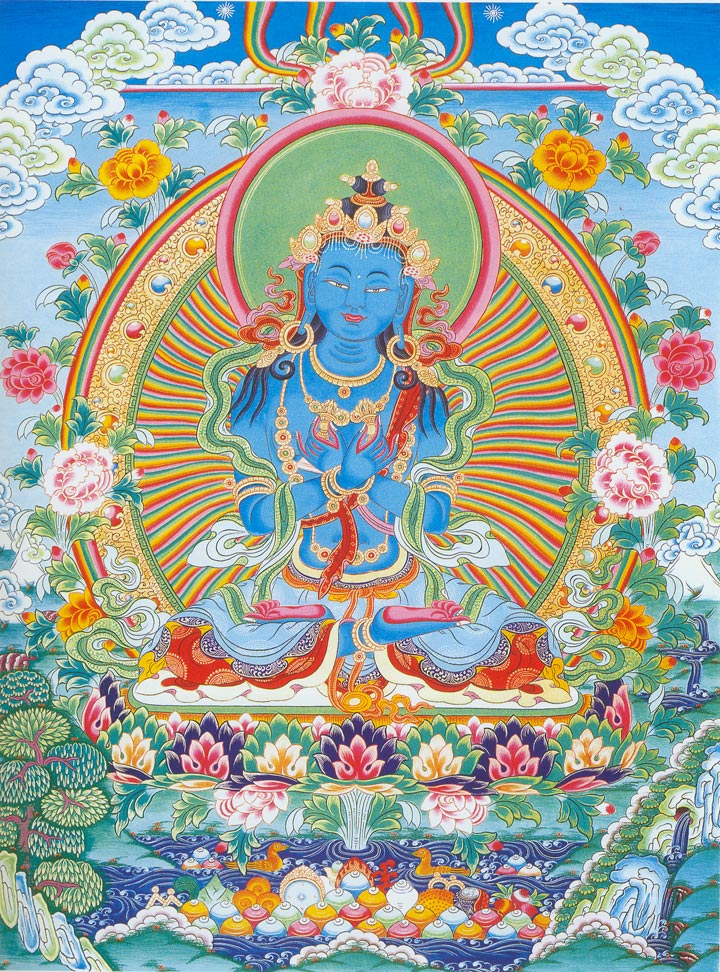
A painting of the Adibuddha, Vajradhara

Transference ('pho ba, *saṃkrānti), is a practice meant to eject one's consciousness out of the body into a state of Awakening at the time of death (or into a Buddha's pure land).

Tilopa states:

By means of these yogas, at the time of transference and also of forceful projection into another body, the yogi can utilize the mantric seed syllable of the deity and train in the deity yoga practice in conjunction with the exhalation and inhalation [of the breath], long and short, and project consciousness to wherever is desired. Alternatively, those desiring to transfer to a higher realm can apply themselves to two syllables of YAM, and also HI-KA, and HUM-HUM. Consciousness is thrown to the heart of the deity inseparable from the guru, and from there to whatever buddhafield is desired. This too is the instruction of Sukhasiddhi.

==== Gampopa's presentation ====
According to Gampopa's Closely Stringed Pearls, there are three types of phowa:

1. Transference from the state of Radiance, used by the best practitioners
2. Transference from the state of Illusory Body, used by mid-level practitioners
3. Transference from the Generation Stage, used by lesser practitioners

In the first type of phowa, one sits, generates bodhicitta and visualizes a letter Hum in the heart chakra. Light radiates out from the Hum and transforms the world into a pure palace and all beings into deities. This all dissolves into a light that merges with oneself. One's own deity form dissolves into the Hum syllable, which gradually fades away. Then one rests in the state of Mahamudra. This meditation is to be done repeatedly. At the time of death, one then follows the same process, which can lead to Buddhahood.

In the second type of phowa, there is a preparatory stage (sbyang) done while dreaming and a stage of the actual practice ('pho ba dngos). In the preparatory training, one flies up to the seat of the celestial Buddha Vajradhara and forms a strong intention to cultivate Mahamudra. Then, at the time of death, when the subtle elements of the body have dissolved, the yogi transfers their consciousness to the seat of Vajradhara and appears there in the essenceless form of their chosen deity, appearing like a reflection in a mirror. They meditate on radiance from that state of illusory body and thus reach Buddhahood.

In the third type, the yogi first visualizes themselves in the illusory form of a chosen deity and imagines the channels and chakras, with syllables in each chakra. Then they practice the pot belly breathing (bum pa can, *kumbhaka), holding their breath in the abdomen while imagining that the syllables are moving in the central channel, opening up the channel at the crown of the head. At the time of death, when the yogi does this exercise, the letter in the heart chakra is shot out of the body through the crown and merges with the heart of the lama who has been visualized in front of the yogi. Imagining that the lama is also essenceless, the yogi rests in that state. When the yogi stops breathing and dies, their mind merges with natural Radiance and they achieve Buddhahood.

There is also another kind of phowa practice, known as "forceful phowa" (btsan thabs kyi 'pho ba). This is a practice that is performed by a yogi on a dying person by putting them in a specific pose and pushing in their abdomen. This forcefully moves their inner winds upward through the crown of the head. The dying person should visualize their consciousness being sent out through the crown and merging with the lama's heart.

==== Gelug presentation ====
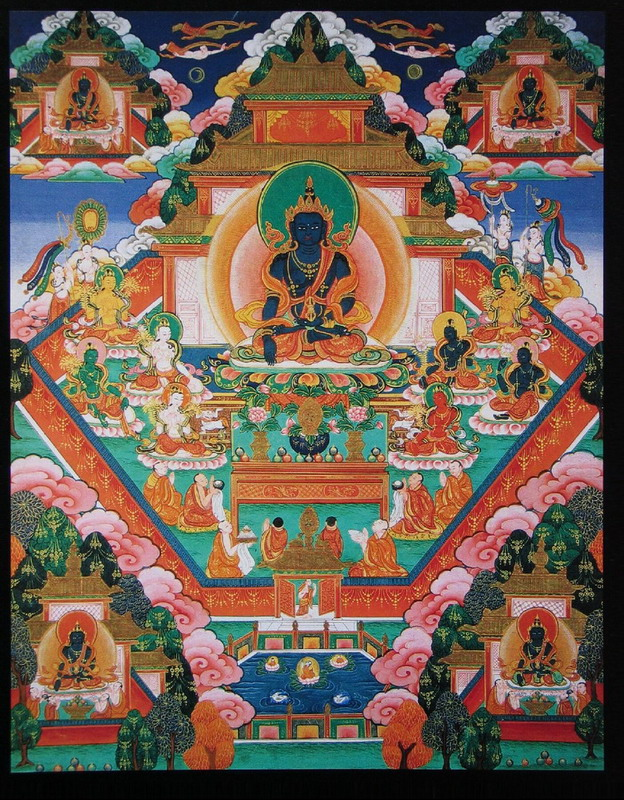
Buddha Akshobhya's pure land Abhirati

To be successful in this practice according to Tsongkhapa, one's subtle channels should have been trained in one's life through inner heat, illusory body and clear light yogas. There are also special phowa practices which prepare the subtle channels for transference as death. Then when death comes, one will be ready to transfer one's consciousness to a buddhafield or into a proper future life.

Tsongkhapa outlines phowa training as follows. First one visualizes oneself as the deity and brings the vital winds to the navel (or to the chakra in the secret place).

One then envisions the red AH-stroke syllable at the navel chakra; at the heart chakra, a dark blue HUM; and at the crown aperture, a white KSHA. Now one pulls up forcefully on the vital energies from below. These strike the AH-stroke syllable at the navel chakra, which then rises and strikes the HUM at the heart. This rises and strikes the KSHA at the crown. Then the process is reversed: the HUM comes back down to the heart chakra; and the AH comes back down to the navel chakra. Here sometimes it is said that the AH-stroke syllable dissolves into HUM [and that into the KSHA] during the upward movement. The approach as described above is more effective. One should apply oneself to this training until the signs of accomplishment manifest, such as a small blister appearing on the crown of the head, a sensation of itching, and so forth.

This phowa practice "opens the death passage" so that at "the time of actual application" (i.e. death), it will be ready. Tsongkhapa further notes that if one has not trained in inner heat, this practice will not be effective. At the time of actual application, one takes refuge, arouses bodhicitta, visualizes oneself as the deity and visualizes the guru in front of one's crown, offering prayers to them. Then,

one turns one's concentration to the three mantric syllables: the red AH-stroke at the navel chakra; blue HUM at the heart chakra; and white KSHA at the crown. The energies are forcefully drawn up from below, causing the AH-stroke syllable to rise up the central chan-nel from the navel chakra and melt into the HUM at the heart chakra. One recites the mantra AH HIK several times. The HUM syllable moves up. One recites the mantra AH HIK twenty times, and it continues up to the throat chakra. One turns the attention to the syllable KSHA at the mouth of the Brahma aperture, silhouetted against a background of pure white sky-like light, like an object in a roof window. One recites AH HIK forcefully five times, and the syllable HUM shoots out the Brahma aperture and melts into the heart of the guru inseparable from one's mandala deity. Rest awareness there in the state beyond conceptuality.

Tsongkhapa also discusses how to transfer one's consciousness into a Buddha's pure land. This is done by using one's meditative samadhi power to prevent the consciousness from exiting by any of the eight gates, and to project out of the ninth, the "golden gate". The eight gates are: mouth, navel, sexual organ, anus, "treasury' (forehead aperture), nose, eyes and ears. This is done by visualizing that the eight gates are closed with red AH stroke syllables. Then one uses tummo to draw the vital winds into the central channel, propelling one's consciousness, represented by the blue HUM at the heart, out of the crown aperture, to a pure Buddhafield.

Regarding forceful projection (grong 'jug), Tsongkhapa counts this as a separate dharma. One trains in this practice by first transferring one's consciousness into the fresh corpse of small animals, until one is able to transfer into the fresh corpse of a person. Then at death, one can transfer one's consciousness to a fresh corpse.

=== Post-mortem interim state yoga ===
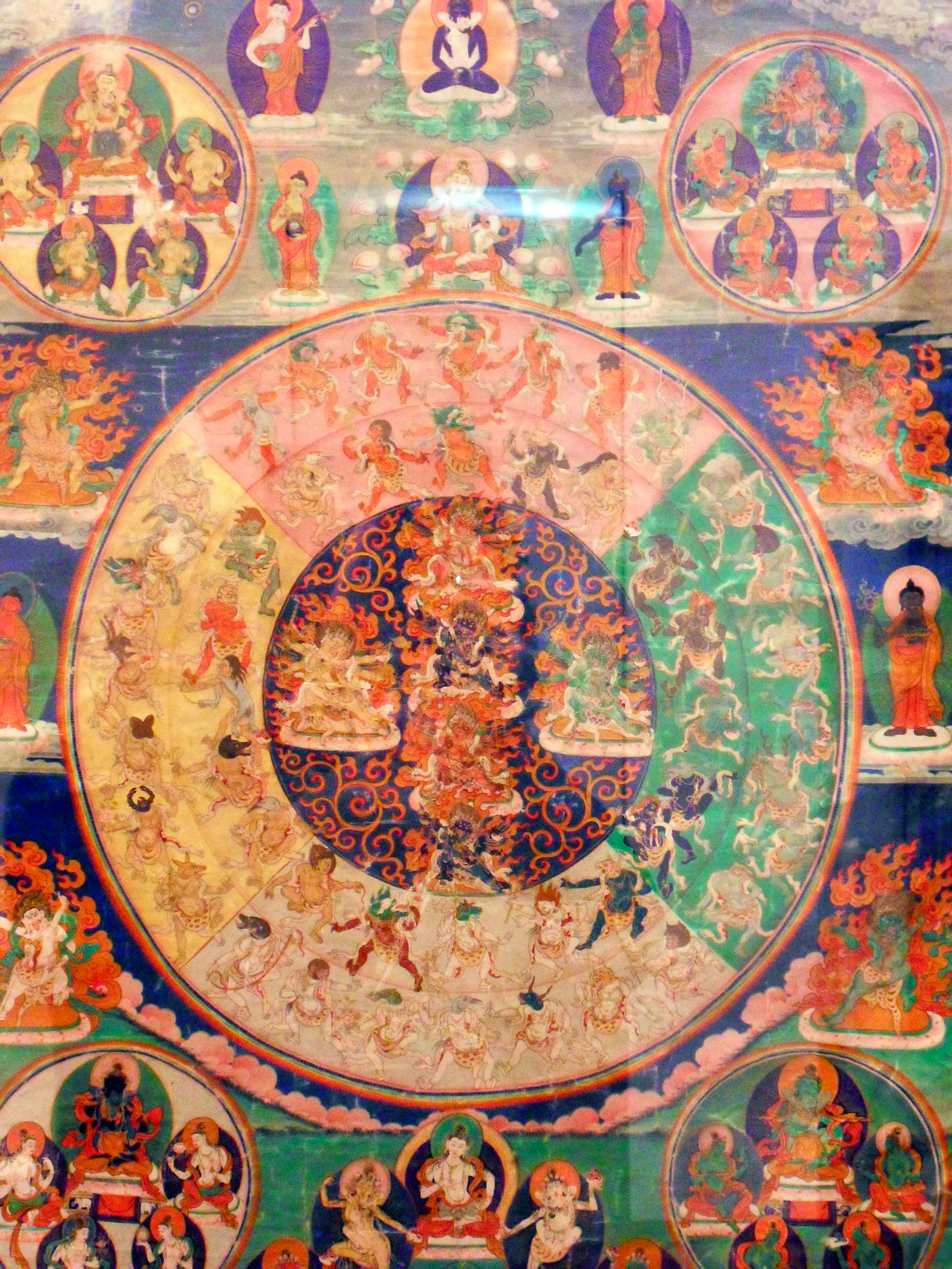
The deities that one may encounter in the post-mortem interim state

These practices deal with navigating the bardo state in between death and rebirth. Tilopa's oral instructions state:

The yogi at the time of death withdraws the energies of the senses and elements, and directs energies of sun and moon to the heart, giving rise to a myriad of yogic samadhis. Consciousness goes to outer objects, but he regards them as objects of a dream. The appearances of death persist for seven days, or perhaps as much as seven times seven, and then one must take rebirth. At that time meditate on deity yoga or simply remain absorbed in emptiness. After that, when the time comes for rebirth, use the deity yoga of a tantric master and meditate on guru yoga with whatever appears. Doing that will arrest the experience of the bardo. This is the instruction of Sukhasiddhi.

According to Gyalwa Wensapa, one should practice tummo before death to experience radiance and then arise as Buddha Vajradhara in one's bardo body.

==== Gampopa's presentation ====
Gampopa's Closely Stringed Pearls describe a "practical guidance" (dmar khrid) on the process of the interim state or in-between state. It gives a long explanation of the death process and how it is experienced by the dying person. The interim state is said to occur after death for up to seven weeks until the next rebirth.

There are three parts of these instructions:

1. recognizing the radiance in the first interim
2. recognizing the illusory body in the second interim
3. blocking the door to the womb in the third interim

The process of dying is outlined as follows. First the five outer sense perceptions dissolve, one by one. Then the four material elements dissolve. When the earth element dissolves the body feels like sinking, when the water element dissolves spit and snot come out of the mouth and nose, and one's mouth and nose become dry. When the fire element dissolves, body heat disappears and the extremities shake and twitch. When the air element dissolves, breathing becomes irregular and eventually stops. Then the consciousness dissolves into light and the dying person sees a weak light, like the moon rising and their consciousness becomes smoky. Then comes the phase of rising, in which one sees a more intense light, which is like a sunrise, while one's consciousness flickers like fireflies. Then during the phase of arrival, one finds oneself in dense darkness and one's consciousness is weak like the light of a single flame. Then, the phase of arrival dissolves into the radiance (’od gsal) of emptiness, dharmakaya, which is found in all beings. For a yogi who has practiced meditation on radiance before, their radiance meditation merges with the natural radiance easily.

The second instruction on recognizing the illusory body is meant for those yogis who fail to remain in the state of radiance and thus enter the bardo (between half a day and four days after death). It is divided into recognizing the impure illusory body and recognizing the pure illusory body. In the bardo, one appears in a dream-like body which is similar to one's previous living body, this is the impure illusory body. They are able to go anywhere and is unobstructed by physical things, but when they attempt to talk to people, they cannot hear the dead person. The dead person gradually realizes they are dead and after some days, they see that they will soon be reborn. If the dead person is a yogi, they may be able to recognize that this body is illusory and they may instead take up the form of their chosen meditation deity. They then meditate on Mahamudra and purify their habital tendencies. It is said that meditation in the in-between state is more efficient than meditating a hundred years while alive.

The third type of instruction explains how to block rebirth if one fails to become awakened using the second set of instructions. At this stage, the person to be reborn sees their future parents having sex and feel attraction towards the father or the mother (depending on their sex). Then they will enter the womb and into a new rebirth. However, the deceased person can prevent this process by staying calm and entering meditative absorption when they have the vision. They can image their parents as lamas or as deities if this helps avoid feelings of desire for them. They can also contemplate that they are empty, like illusions and meditate on radiance and emptiness.

==== Gelug presentation ====
Tsongkhapa's commentary states that bardo yoga relies on the yogi's previous practice of tummo, radiance, illusory body and dream yoga. After all, the experiences of illusory body and clear light in waking and in sleep states is similar to the experiences in the post-mortem bardo. Thus, when death comes, one applies the same principles one used to attain the yoga of radiance/clear light in sleep:

Should death arrive before supreme enlightenment has been attained, and one wishes to apply the yoga for enlightenment at the time of death, then [as the death process sets in] one engages the yogas of controlling the vital energies in order to recognize the clear light of the moment of death, using the same principles that were applied in the yoga of retaining the clear light of sleep. In this way one enters into the bardo experience, applies the techniques learned through the yoga of the illusory body of dreams, and generates the bardo body as the illusory body of the bardo.

Thus, to achieve the clear light of death, one must go through the practice of tummo, the dissolution of the elements process and the visions leading up to clear light and so forth. One must have the ability to stabilize one's mind on an understanding of emptiness and the yogic means for inducing the four blisses to succeed.

Tsongkhapa also states that there are two lesser methods, one is to cultivate the thought, "I am dead. These appearances must be bardo manifestations." This may help one recognize that one is in the bardo. Likewise, one can apply whatever samadhi one has acquired to the process of the dissolution of the elements at death. But these methods are inferior to the tantric practice of clear light yoga and lead to weak realizations. He also mentions "the oath of rebirth" where one "cultivates the aspiration to take rebirth into any of the pure buddha lands."

== Related traditions ==
The six dharmas of Niguma are almost identical to the six dharmas of Nāropa. Niguma, who was an enlightened yogini, a Vajrayana teacher, one of the founders of the Shangpa Kagyu Buddhist lineage, and, depending on the sources, either the sister or spiritual consort of Nāropa. The second Dalai Lama, Gendun Gyatso has compiled a work on these yogas. Niguma transmitted her teachings to yogini Sukhasiddhī and then to Khyungpu Neldjor, the founder of the Shangpa Kagyu lineage. A translator and teacher in the lineage, Sarah Harding, has published a book about Niguma and the core role her teachings such as the six dharmas of Niguma have played in the development of the Shangpa Kagyu lineage.

== See also ==
- Bardo Thodol (Tibetan Book of the Dead)
- Tsa lung Trul khor (Tibetan Yoga)

== Sources ==
- Guenther, Herbert V. (1963). The Life and Teaching of Naropa, Oxford University Press.
- Kragh, Ulrich Timme (2015) Tibetan Yoga and Mysticism A Textual Study of the Yogas of Naropa and Mahamudra Meditation in the Medieval Tradition of Dags po. Tokyo: International Institute for Buddhist Studies (Studia Philologica Buddhica). ISBN 4-90626-772-6
- Wangyal, Tenzin (1998) The Tibetan Yogas of Dream and Sleep, Snow Lion Publications.
- Mullin, Glenn H.; Tsong-Kha-Pa, (2005) The Six Yogas Of Naropa, Tsongkhapa's Commentary Entitled A Book Of Three Inspirations A Treatise on the Stages Of Training in the Profound Path Of Naro's Six Dharmas, Snow Lion Publications. ISBN 1-55939-234-7
- Mullin, Glenn H. (1997) Readings on the Six Yogas of Naropa, Snow Lion Publications. ISBN 1-55939-074-3
- Harding, Lama Sarah (2012) Niguma, Lady of Illusion (Tsadra Foundation). Ithaca: Snow Lion Publications. ISBN 978-1559393614
- Roberts, Peter Alan (translator) (2011) Mahamudra and Related Instructions: Core Teachings of the Kagyu Schools. Library of Tibetan Classics. Wisdom Publications. ISBN 9780861714445
