= Sarah Harding (lama) =

American Shangpa Kagyu Buddhist lama and teacher

Sarah Elizabeth Harding

Personal life
- Born: 1951 (age 74–75)
- Occupation: Religious educator

Religious life
- Religion: Buddhism
- School: Kagyu

Sarah Elizabeth Harding (born November 24, 1951) is a qualified lama and teacher in the Shangpa Kagyu tradition of Tibetan Buddhism. Since 1972, she has been a student and translator of Kalu Rinpoche (1905-1989). She is the daughter of American screenwriter and playwright Isobel Lennart.

Harding completed the first traditional Kagyu three-year three-month three-day retreat for Westerners under the guidance of Kalu Rinpoche in 1980. Others who participated in that retreat include Richard Barron, Ken McLeod, Ngawang Zangpo (Hugh Leslie Thompson), Ingrid Loken McLeod, and Lama Surya Das (Jeffery Miller).

Harding works as a teacher, interpreter and translator. She retired from Naropa University in 2018 and lives in Boulder, Colorado, with her two children. She is currently working on translations of Tibetan Buddhist texts as a fellow of the Tsadra Foundation. Harding has published a book about the 11th-century female teacher Niguma whose teachings are at the core of the Shangpa Kagyu Vajrayana Buddhist lineage.

== Publications ==
- Labdron, Machik; Harding, Sarah (2016), Chöd: The Sacred Teachings on Severance: Essential Teachings of the Eight Practice Lineages of Tibet, Volume 14 (The Treasury of Precious Instructions), Ithaca, NY: Snow Lion Publications, ISBN 978-1611803723
- Labdron, Machik; Harding, Sarah (2013), Machik's Complete Explanation: Clarifying the Meaning of Chöd (Expanded Edition), Ithaca, NY: Snow Lion Publications, ISBN 978-1559394147
- Harding, Sarah (2012), Niguma, Lady of Illusion, Ithaca, NY: Snow Lion Publications, ISBN 978-1559393614
- Kongtrul, Jamgon; Harding, Sarah (2007), Treasury of Knowledge: Esoteric Instructions, A Detailed Presentation of the Process of Meditation in Vajrayana (Treasury of Knowledge Bk. 8, Pt. 4), Ithaca, NY: Snow Lion Publications, ISBN 978-1-55939-284-6
- Harding, Sarah (2003), The Life and Revelations of Pema Lingpa, Ithaca, NY: Snow Lion Publications, ISBN 1-55939-194-4
- Labdron, Machik; Harding, Sarah (2003), Machik's Complete Explanation: Clarifying the Meaning of Chöd, Ithaca, NY: Snow Lion Publications, ISBN 1-55939-182-0
- Kongtrul, Jamgon; Harding, Sarah (2002), Creation and Completion, Wisdom Publications, ISBN 0-86171-312-5
