= Ken McLeod =

Canadian lama

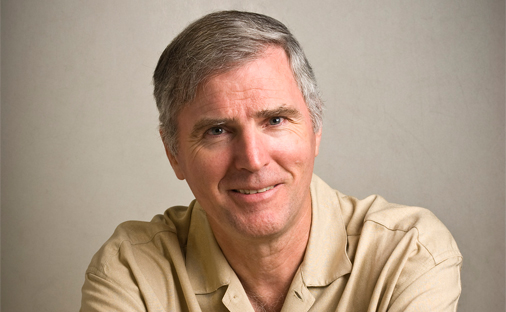

Personal life
- Born: 1948 (age 77–78)
- Occupation: translator, author and teacher

Religious life
- Religion: Tibetan Buddhism
- School: Shangpa Kagyu

Senior posting
- Teacher: Kalu Rinpoche

Ken McLeod (born 1948) is a senior Western translator, author, and teacher of Tibetan Buddhism. He received traditional training mainly in the Shangpa Kagyu lineage through a long association with his principal teacher, Kalu Rinpoche, whom he met in 1970. McLeod resided in Los Angeles for many years, where he founded Unfettered Mind. He currently lives in Windsor, California. He describes himself as "retired", having withdrawn from teaching, and no longer conducting classes, workshops, meditation retreats, individual practice consultations, or teacher training.

Under Kalu Rinpoche's guidance, McLeod learned the Tibetan language and completed two traditional three-year retreats (1976–1983). In the years that followed, he traveled and worked with Kalu Rinpoche on various projects, and became a prominent translator of Buddhist texts, including a landmark translation of The Great Path of Awakening by the first Jamgon Kongtrul, a key text in the teaching of lojong ("mind training").

In 1985, he settled in Los Angeles to run Kalu Rinpoche's dharma center. He did so until 1990, when he founded his own organization, Unfettered Mind. He taught strictly traditional material, but is recognized (1) for having pioneered a new teacher–student model based upon ongoing, one-on-one consultations and upon small teaching groups that have a high degree of teacher–student interaction, and (2) for his "pragmatic" approach to teaching, translation, and practice.

The intent of Pragmatic Buddhism is to preserve the essence of the teachings unchanged, but to make them more directly accessible to the Westerner. It does so by bypassing the Eastern, cultural overlay, and using simple, clear language and methods that elicit direct experience in the practitioner. It also emphasizes an individualized practice path, with a key element being ongoing practice consults that allow the teacher to shape a path that's tailored to each practitioner's specific needs and makeup. (see "Ideas", below) McLeod has made this model available for others to use via the Unfettered Mind website, his teacher development program, and his publications, especially Wake Up To Your Life, which lays out the Buddhist path and practices. His non-traditional commentary on the Heart Sutra, An Arrow to the Heart, presents a way into the material that is poetic and experiential.

== Career ==
Ken McLeod was born in 1948 in Yorkshire, England, and raised in Canada. He holds an M.Sc. in Mathematics from the University of British Columbia. In 1970, he met Ven. Kalu Rinpoche at his monastery outside Darjeeling, India, and began studying Tibetan Buddhism. Kalu Rinpoche became his principal teacher, and thus began a long association between the two. Other significant teachers included Dezhung Rinpoche, Thrangu Rinpoche, Gangteng Tulku Rinpoche, the sixteenth Karmapa, and Kilung Rinpoche.

In the 1970s and 1980s, McLeod received training, plus travelled, translated, and worked on Kalu Rinpoche's many projects. He was the English interpreter for Kalu Rinpoche's first two tours of the West (1972 and 1974–75). He also translated texts: Writings of Kalu Rinpoche, A Continuous Rain to Benefit Beings, and The Great Path of Awakening by Jamgon Kongtrul, which he published as "The Direct Path to Enlightenment." In 1974, Chogyam Trungpa Rinpoche offered his own translation of the basic slogans therein, and criticized McLeod's translation of the title—although Trungpa liked the translation generally. McLeod publicly accepted the criticism, and Shambhala Publications published the book in 1987 as The Great Path of Awakening. Trungpa Rinpoche's own book on the slogans included McLeod's translations for comparison.

In 1976, McLeod joined Kalu Rinpoche in Central France to help establish, and then participate in, the first three-year retreat for Westerners, at Kagyu Ling.; this was the first of McLeod's three-year retreats (1976–1983). His fellow retreatants included others who also went on to become senior Western teachers and translators: Sarah Harding, Ingrid McLeod, Richard Barron, Anthony Chapman, Denis Eysseric, and Hugh Thompson. In 1985, at Kalu Rinpoche's request, McLeod translated and published The Chariot for Traveling the Path to Freedom: the Life Story of Kalu Rinpoche. Also in that year, Kalu Rinpoche authorized McLeod to teach, and asked him to be the resident teacher at his Dharma center, Kagyu Dongak Chuling (KDC), in Los Angeles. McLeod was an interpreter for several other Kagyu teachers, most notably for the third Jamgon Kongtrul (of Palpung) at the 1990 Kalachakra empowerment in Toronto.

After several years at KDC, McLeod saw that the traditional, religious-center approach wasn't meeting his students’ needs. So he began evolving a new, non-traditional model based upon regular, one-on-one practice consultations; small, highly interactive teaching groups and meditation retreats; the notion of the individual practice path; an informal student–teacher relationship; and a "pragmatic" way to present material. These key elements would become the core of his teaching.

In 1990, he left KDC to set up a non-profit organization, Unfettered Mind, as a vehicle for this approach. At the time, the notion of a Buddhist teacher establishing a private practice went against accepted convention; it caused much controversy in 1996, when he presented the idea to the Buddhist Teachers Conference, but has since been adopted by many teachers. During the 1990s, McLeod established a corporate consulting business, organized three conferences on Buddhism and Psychotherapy, and developed the curriculum that eventually became his book Wake Up To Your Life: Discovering the Buddhist Path of Attention (2001).

After fifteen years, he realized that this model could not accommodate the ways in which Unfettered Mind was growing and evolving. His practice as a business consultant gave him an understanding of how the flaws that characterize organizations and institutions could also be found in Unfettered Mind and most other Buddhist organizations. So in 2005, he began a sabbatical leave; in 2006, he re-invented Unfettered Mind. In an effort to avoid the structure and hierarchy of most Buddhist institutions, Unfettered Mind is now modeled as a network: in addition to the usual, teacher-driven activities (classes, workshops, retreats), UM is developing a wide range of web-based resources from which a practitioner—local or non-local—can find information, guidance, and teachings that meet their own individual needs and enable them to shape their own, specific path, outside of an established, institutional framework.

== Ideas ==
Two principles underlie McLeod's work:

- Direct experience: Conceptual understanding is no substitute for the kind of knowing that comes from direct experience. Buddhist material must be presented in a way that transmits, points to, or elicits direct experience.
- Transparency: The customs and traditions associated with Buddhist practice in other cultures have been an obstacle for many Western practitioners. The solution is to distinguish the teachings from the overlay of medieval, Asian, cultural forms.

=== Key elements ===
Living awake

"Living awake" is the ability to practice attention in every aspect of one's life: Buddhism is fundamentally a set of methods to wake us up from the sleep in which we dream that we are separate from what we experience. "Everything that [we] experience is original mind; there is nothing else. . . . Rest in original mind, not separate from the experience that is your life . . . Cultivate attention in everything you do, and, until your last breath, live in the mystery of being." Unfettered Mind is structured to support this intention—as an individual on the cushion, in daily life, and in all elements of the UM network, from administration to practice and study.

Cultural overlay

As Buddhism penetrates the West, there are difficulties in trying to transfer the institutions, language, and terminology of a medieval, agrarian, Asian society to the post-modern, industrial, multi-cultural society of the West, with its own overlay of individualism, lack of hierarchy, and psychological preoccupations. The Western teacher must bypass the cultural overlay, go to the heart of the teachings, and find simple, transparent language and methods to elicit direct understanding in the student.

Translation must be transparent

"Ken McLeod is well known as a translator of texts, practices, rituals, and structures into forms suitable for this culture." The Tibetan language has terms that were specifically invented to transmit Buddhism. Because of this, it embodies understanding and it speaks to experience. However, a straight across, literal translation to English loses this resonance, and instead becomes formal and conceptual—and intellectual ideas don't have the power to penetrate to the part of ourselves that truly knows. In translation, teaching, and writing, one must use simple, direct English that's natural and non-academic; use intuitive, emotional language and accessible terms; translate for the person who's going to practice, not for the linguist or academic; and use everyday language that the practitioner can relate to from their own experience.

A contemporary, Western model for Buddhist teaching and practice must integrate the traditional and the modern

McLeod's traditional training immersed him in Tibetan language, texts, ritual, and technique. He realized that some practice obstacles arose because, in the context of contemporary American life, Tibetan Buddhist methods can't easily be practiced in the classical manner. So he set about reexamining everything he'd learned and practiced. As a result, Unfettered Mind is faithful to the dharma but steps beyond convention, is non-institutional, and emphasizes an individualistic approach to practice. "My aim is for Unfettered Mind to provide a rich reservoir of resources so that each of us can find our way without sacrificing faith to a set of beliefs, individual questions to institutional answers, and a practice path to a set system of meditations."

Practice is individual-centered, not tradition-centered

The practitioner doesn't follow a set system, but instead shapes their own, unique path of practice and development that may lie outside the curricula in established institutions. As the Buddha said, you have to work things out for yourself.

The teacher–student relationship is informal and one-on-one

Students relate to the teacher as a person. The teacher's function is to point the student to their own knowing, not to set himself up as special. As a meditation consultant, the teacher offers guidance, support, and instruction specific to the student's unique experience.

The Unfettered Mind retreat format integrates traditional and modern

Traditional teachings and meditation instruction are presented in Western language and framework. Innovations include daily, individual interviews, and practical application exercises that move the practitioner into their own experience.

Unfettered Mind is envisioned as a network for the development and distribution of resources for spiritual awakening

- Unfettered Mind has no temple, center, or formal organization.
- There are no members, only participants, both local and virtual via the internet.
- Teacher and practitioners share responsibility for initiating and running projects.
- The sole purpose is for the participants to create resources and opportunities for practice.
- The core element is an "environment of awareness": any situation in which one or more people are directing attention into the mystery of knowing and helping each other to wake up. Examples: practice groups, study groups, group or individual retreats, practice consultations, workshops, classes.
- Another element is to provide web-based resources that are direct aids to practice. These include book recommendations, practice guides, text and prayer translations, podcasts of retreat teachings, podcasts of classes, the opportunity to put practice questions directly to Ken McLeod, and podcasts of question-and-answer sessions between Ken and students.
- Another key element is the teacher training program. McLeod trained long-term practitioners who have significant experience and understanding, and whose paths lie outside established institutions.

McLeod has written, "We feel that most people, when provided with the right training and guidance, will naturally seek to create environments in which they can transform conceptual understanding of spiritual teaching into experiential knowing, and thus resolve their deepest questions about how to make freedom, compassion and awareness alive and active in their lives."

== Publications by Ken McLeod ==
=== Books ===
- Ken McLeod. (2016). A Trackless Path: A commentary on the great completion (dzogchen) teaching of Jigmé Lingpa's Revelations of Ever-present Good. Sonoma, California: Unfettered Mind Media. p. 129. ISBN 978-0-9895153-4-4.
- Ken McLeod. (2014). "Reflections on Silver River" Tokme Zongpo's Thirty seven Practices of a Bodhisattva. Sonoma, California: Unfettered Mind Media. p. 173. ISBN 978-0-9895153-1-3.
- Ken McLeod. (2007). An Arrow to the Heart: A Commentary on the Heart Sutra. Victoria BC Canada: Trafford Publishing. p. 156. ISBN 978-1425133771.
- Ken McLeod. (2001). Wake Up To Your Life: Discovering the Buddhist Path of Attention. San Francisco CA: Harper Collins. p. 480. ISBN 978-0-06-251681-7.
- Kongtrul, Jamgon; Ken McLeod transl. (1987). The Great Path of Awakening: The Classic Guide to Lojong, a Tibetan Buddhist Practice for Cultivating the Heart of Compassion. Boston, Massachusetts: Shambhala. ISBN 978-1-59030-214-9.
- Karmapa XV (1975). A Continuous Rain to Benefit Beings. Ken McLeod, tr. Vancouver: Kagyu Kunkhyab Chuling. p. 33.
- Kalu Rinpoche; Ken McLeod, translation and commentary (1985). The Chariot for Travelling the Path to Freedom: the Life Story of Kalu Rinpoche. Kagyu Dharma. p. 101. ASIN B00071OUPI.
- Kalu Rinpoche; Ken McLeod, tr. (1976). Writings of Kalu Rinpoche. Burnaby BC: Kagyu Kunkhyab Chuling. p. 77.
- Ken McLeod. (2007). "An Arrow to the Heart" a commentary on the heart Sutra. Victoria, Canada: Trafford Publishing. p. 144. ISBN 978-142513377-1.

=== Articles ===
- "Something From Nothing". The Best Buddhist Writing 2011. 2011.
- "Imagine You're Enlightened". Buddhadharma. Fall 2007.
- "Breaking the Habit Habit". Shambhala Sun. January 2005. Archived from the original on 2011-10-03.
- "You Can't Always Get What You Want". Tricycle Magazine. Summer 2004. Archived from the original on 2012-06-01.
- "The First Precept: To Kill or Not to Kill". Tricycle. Winter 2003. Archived from the original on 2012-03-11.
- "Facing Fear". Tricycle. Spring 2002.
- "Relationship with the Teacher: Wake Up Call". Mandala Magazine. June 2002. Archived from the original on 2012-03-26.
- "Bodhicitta Explained". Tricycle. Summer 2018. Archived from the original on 2019-01-11.
- "Forget About Consistency". Tricycle. March 2018.
- "The Progress Question". Tricycle. March 2018.
- "Let Mind Nature Be Your Guru through Mystical Devotion". Tricycle. February 2018.
- "Forgiveness Is Not Buddhist". Tricycle. Winter 2017.
- "A Crooked Tree in Changing Times". Tricycle. January 2017.
- "Reflections on Dzongsar Khyentse's "How We Raise Tulkus"". Tricycle. September 2016.
- "Prayer Without Blind Faith". Tricycle. December 2018.
- "The Way of Freedom". Tricycle. Summer 2010.
- "Why Compassion?". Tricycle. Spring 2013.
- "Where the Thinking Stops". Tricycle. Spring 2016. Archived from the original on 2019-01-19.
- "Let Mind Nature Be Your Guru through Mystical Devotion". Tricycle. February 2018.
- "Forget Happiness". Tricycle. Spring 2004.
- "Two Truths". Tricycle. Fall 2012.
- "Awakening to Anger". Tricycle. Summer 1998.
- "Something from Nothing". Tricycle. Winter 2010.
- "Forget About Being A Buddhist. Be A Human". Tricycle. November 2016. Archived from the original on 2019-01-19.
- "Taking Fear Apart". Tricycle. Spring 2002.
- "Mind Nature: Red Pill or Blue Pill?". Tricycle. November 2018.
- "Freedom and Choice". Tricycle. Winter 2012. Archived from the original on 2019-01-19.

=== Podcasts ===
- "Retreats, Classes, and Q&A Sessions". Unfettered Mind (Podcast). Archived from the original on 2008-07-05.

== See also ==
- Tibetan Buddhism
- Lojong
- Kalu Rinpoche
