= Glenn H. Mullin =

Tibetologist and Buddhist teacher (born 1949)

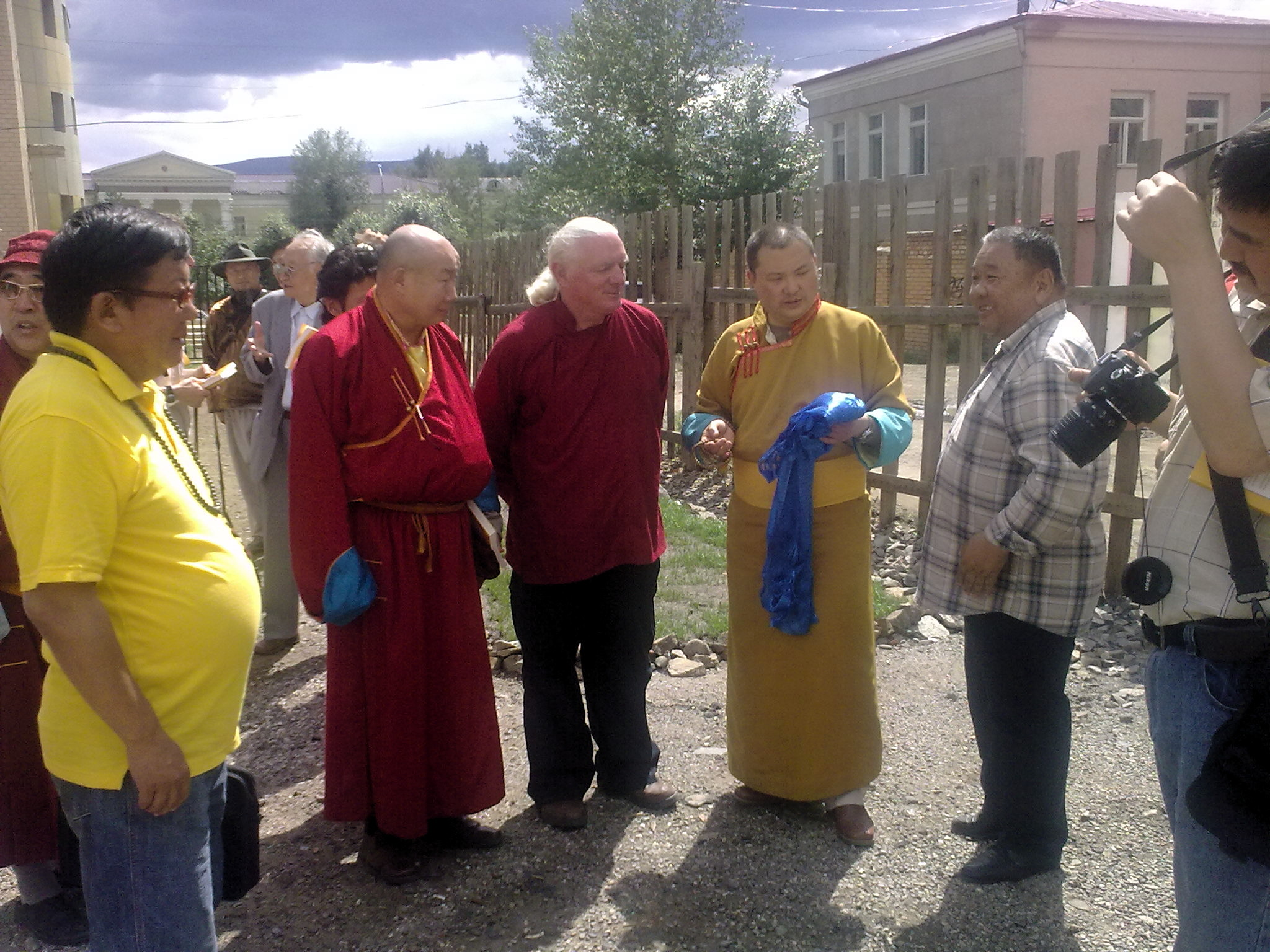
Mullin during the visit of Telo Tulku to Roerich House, Ulan Bator

Glenn H. Mullin (born June 22, 1949, in Quebec, Canada) is a Tibetologist, Buddhist writer, translator of classical Tibetan literature and teacher of Tantric Buddhist meditation.

Mullin has written over twenty-five books on Tibetan Buddhism. Many of these focus on the lives and works of the early Dalai Lamas. Some of his other titles include Tsongkhapa's Six Yogas of Naropa and The Practice of Kalachakra (Snow Lion); Death and Dying: The Tibetan Tradition (Arkana/Viking Penguin); Mystical Verses of a Mad Dalai Lama (Quest Books); The Mystical Arts of Tibet (Longstreet Press); and The Fourteen Dalai Lamas, as well as The Female Buddhas (Clear Light Books). He has also worked as a field specialist on three Tibet-related films and five television documentaries, and has co-produced five audio recordings of Tibetan sacred music.

== Biography ==
Glenn Mullin lived in the Indian Himalayas between 1972 and 1984, where he studied philosophy, literature, meditation, yoga, and the enlightenment culture under thirty-five living masters from the four schools of Tibetan Buddhism. His two principal tantric gurus were the masters Ling Rinpoche (1903–1983) and Trijang Rinpoche (1901–1981), who were best known as the senior and junior tutors of the present (14th) Dalai Lama. Mullin's other teachers and initiation masters include the Dalai Lama, the 41st Sakya Trizin Rinpoche, Kalu Rinpoche, Ngakpa Yeshe Dorje Rinpoche, Tai Situ Rinpoche, Khenchen Konchok Gyaltsen, Geshe Ngawang Dargyey, Geshey Rabten, and Gongsar Tulku.

After returning to North America in 1984, Mullin founded The Mystical Arts of Tibet. This association, under his direction, facilitated music and dance tours of Tibetan monks in North America. The first such tours to reach the west, they also included demonstrations of mandala sand paintings. The association had the objectives to "contribute mystically to world peace and planetary healing [and] raise awareness of the Tibet situation" at that time. Moreover, the association generated funds for the Tibetan refugees in India and later dedicated its mission to the activities of Drepung Loseling, the largest of Tibet's monastic universities.

== Awards ==
In 2002 his book The Fourteen Dalai Lamas was nominated for the NAPRA ("New Alternatives for Publishers, Retailers and Artists") award for best book, and in 2004 his book The Female Buddhas won a Best Book Award from Foreword Magazine.

== Tibetan art exhibits ==
Mullin used his international connections to organize and/or curate Tibetan art shows, including:

- The Flying Mystics of Tibetan Buddhism, Oglethorpe University, 2004
- Female Buddhas: Women of Enlightenment in Tibetan Mysticism, Bruce Museum of Arts and Science, 2005
- Portals to Shangri-La: Masterpieces from Buddhist Mongolia, Oglethorpe University, 2006.

== Bibliography ==
- A Long Look Homeward: An Interview with the Dalai Lama of Tibet. Snow Lion Publications. 1987. ISBN 978-0-937938-58-4.
- Path of the Bodhisattva Warrior: The Life and Teachings of the Thirteenth Dalai Lama. Snow Lion Publications. 1987. ISBN 978-0-937938-55-3.
- Death and Dying: The Tibetan Tradition. Arkana. Penguin Books. 1988. ISBN 978-0-14-019013-7.
- The Practice of Kalachakra. Ithaca, NY: Snow Lion Publications. 1991. ISBN 978-0-937938-95-9.
- Living in the Face of Death: The Tibetan Tradition. Ithaca, NY: Snow Lion Publications. 1998. ISBN 978-1559391009.
- The Fourteen Dalai Lamas: A Sacred Legacy of Reincarnation. Santa Fe, NM: Clear Light Publishers. 2001. ISBN 978-1574160390.
- Mullin, Glenn H.; Watt, Jeff (2003). Female Buddhas, Women of Enlightenment in Tibetan Mystical Art. Santa Fe, NM: Clear Light Publishers. ISBN 978-1574160673.
- The Flying Mystics of Tibetan Buddhism. Serindia Publications, Inc. 2006. ISBN 978-1-932476-18-7.
- The Practice of the Six Yogas of Naropa (2nd ed.). Snow Lion Publications. 2006 [1977]. ISBN 978-1-55939-256-3.
- Mullin, Glenn H; Stoddard, Heather (2007). Buddha in Paradise: A Celebration in Himalayan Art. New York: Rubin Museum of Art. ISBN 978-0-9772131-1-5.

=== Translations ===
- Dalai Lama III (1978). Essence of Refined Gold. Translated by Mullin, Glenn H. Dharamsala: Tushita Books.
- Dalai Lama II (1994). Mystical Verses of a Mad Dalai Lama. Translated by Mullin, Glenn H. Quest Books. ISBN 978-0835607001.
- Tsongkhapa (1996). Tsongkhapa's Six Yogas of Naropa. Translated by Mullin, Glenn H. Ithaca, NY: Snow Lion Publications. ISBN 978-1-55939-058-3.
- Dalai Lama VII (1999). Gems of Wisdom from the Seventh Dalai Lama. Tibetan Buddhist Philosophy. Translated by Mullin, Glenn H. Ithaca, NY: Snow Lion Publications. ISBN 978-1-55939-132-0.
- Dalai Lama II (2005). The Second Dalai Lama: His Life and Teachings. Translated by Mullin, Glenn H. Ithaca, NY: Snow Lion Publications. ISBN 978-1559392334.
- Dalai Lamas (2006). The Dalai Lamas on Tantra. Translated by Mullin, Glenn H. Ithaca, NY: Snow Lion Publications. ISBN 978-1559392693.
