= Isobel Lennart =

American screenwriter and playwright

- Born: May 18, 1915; New York City, U.S.
- Died: January 25, 1971 (aged 55); Hemet, California, U.S.
- Occupations: Screenwriter, playwright
- Spouse: John Harding (m. 1945)
- Children: 2, including Sarah Harding

Isobel Lennart (May 18, 1915 – January 25, 1971) was an American screenwriter and playwright. She is best known for writing the book for the Broadway musical Funny Girl which premiered in 1964, although she also wrote scripts for successful Hollywood films featuring major stars, some of which received Oscar nominations.

== Biography ==
Lennart was born in Brooklyn, New York to Jewish parents; her father, Edward M. Hochdorf, was a dentist and her mother was Victoria Lennart Livingston. As a child, Lennart caught polio and spent 10 years in leg braces. Lennart married actor and writer John Harding in Las Vegas, Nevada in 1945. They had two children, Joshua Lennart Harding (December 27, 1947 – August 4, 1971) and Sarah Elizabeth Harding (born November 24, 1951). Lennart was killed in an automobile crash in Hemet, California in 1971 at the age of 55.

== Professional life ==
Lennart worked in the MGM mail room in New York, a job she lost when she attempted to organize a union. After moving to Los Angeles in 1937, she reportedly worked as a secretary to Richard Schayer, and then at Metro Studios. In 1941, she was promoted from "script-girl to contract writer" at 20th Century Studios. IMDb credits her with work on 30 films and television episodes, most of which involved major stars such as Lana Turner, Doris Day, Danny Kaye, Robert Mitchum, Walter Pidgeon, Barbara Stanwyck, James Mason, Ava Gardner, and Cyd Charisse, and major directors such as Jules Dassin, Mervyn LeRoy, Charles Vidor, and Robert Wise. At least two of her screenplays, Merry Andrew and This Could be the Night, have been published.

Lennart's first script, The Affairs of Martha, an original comedy about the residents of a wealthy community who fear their secrets are about to be revealed in an exposé written by one of their maids, was filmed in 1942 with Spring Byington, Marjorie Main, and Richard Carlson. She was hired by MGM in a full-time position. This was followed in quick succession by A Stranger in Town (1943), Anchors Aweigh (1945), and It Happened in Brooklyn (1947).

Lennart's later screen credits include A Life of Her Own, Love Me or Leave Me (for which she received an Academy Award nomination in 1955), Merry Andrew, The Inn of the Sixth Happiness, Please Don't Eat the Daisies, The Sundowners (which also received an Academy Award nomination), and Two for the Seesaw.

In 1966, she won the Laurel Award for Screenwriting Achievement from the Writers Guild of America. By 1967 she was "commanding $100,000 per picture".

In 1968, Lennart wrote the screen adaptation of Funny Girl, which won her a Writers Guild of America award for Best Screenplay. It proved to be her last work.

== Funny Girl on stage (1964 and 2022) and screen (1968) ==
Funny Girl is based on the life and career of Jewish vaudevillian comedian Fanny Brice (1891–1951) and her romantic relationship with gambler Nick Arnstein. Born to Jewish immigrants living in Manhattan's Lower East Side, Brice rose from the tenements via the Ziegfeld Follies to succeed as a stage, radio, and film performer. Her relationship with Arnstein, whom she married, has been described as "doomed."

In the original production, Brice was portrayed by Barbra Streisand. It ran for 1,348 performances and catapulted Streisand to fame. It also earned her a Tony Award nomination.

Both Brice and Streisand became cultural icons, and Streisand's success on stage and screen as a funny woman overshadowed Lennart's achievement. Nonetheless, Lennart's successful introduction of a funny female Jewish character to the Broadway stage opened doors for other "talented, confident, funny [female characters] in a room full of men," according to theater scholar and director Barrie Gelles, who researches the intersection of Broadway musicals and Jewish identity.

Lennart wrote the book for the Broadway musical Funny Girl, meaning that she wrote the dialogue, created the story, crafted the structure, and developed the characters. Jule Styne wrote the original music and Bob Merrill wrote the original lyrics.

Unsurprisingly, as Lennart recounted, she first wrote her story of Fanny Brice's life in screenplay form. "Vincent J. Donehue, the [theater and film] director, read some pages at my home in Malibu one day and went wild about them. He called Mary Martin and later Ray Stark, and the thing just snowballed. Ray wanted me to do it as a play and I agreed just to please him. Well, not altogether. My vanity entered into it; I didn't want anyone else messing around with my idea." Lennart, the only member of the creative team present from concept to end result, outlasted others who left or were let go, including theater director Jerome Robbins. When Robbins wanted to fire Lennart, Stark fired him instead.

Funny Girl was the highest grossing film of 1968.

In 2022 Funny Girl had its first revival on Broadway, with Beanie Feldstein playing the lead. In the modern era, Fanny's professional savvy bumps up hard against her romantic sentimentality, although even the original production was criticized for its sentimentality by Howard Taubman, the New York Times theater reviewer then. For the revival, Harvey Fierstein was brought in to revise the book, but critical reception found the same weaknesses as before. However, prior to the Broadway revival, according to Fierstein, pre-pandemic productions of his revised version were successful in London theaters and on tour.

== Association with the Communist Party ==
Along with her union activities, Lennart was a member of the Young Communist League. She joined the Communist Party in 1938 but left in August 1939 because "of her opposition to the German-Soviet Nonaggression Treaty". She rejoined the Communist Party in June 1941 as what she called "a passive member." Lennart left the Communist Party again in spring 1945.

In 1947, the House Un-American Activities Committee (HUAC) began an investigation into the motion picture industry. The ensuing practice of blacklisting Hollywood writers thought to have Communist sympathies led Lennart to become a "friendly witness" when she was called to testify before HUAC in 1952, and she named more than 20 people as former party members. In 1970, she said that she regretted this decision.
