= Salugara Monastery =

Buddhist shrine outside Siliguri, West Bengal, India

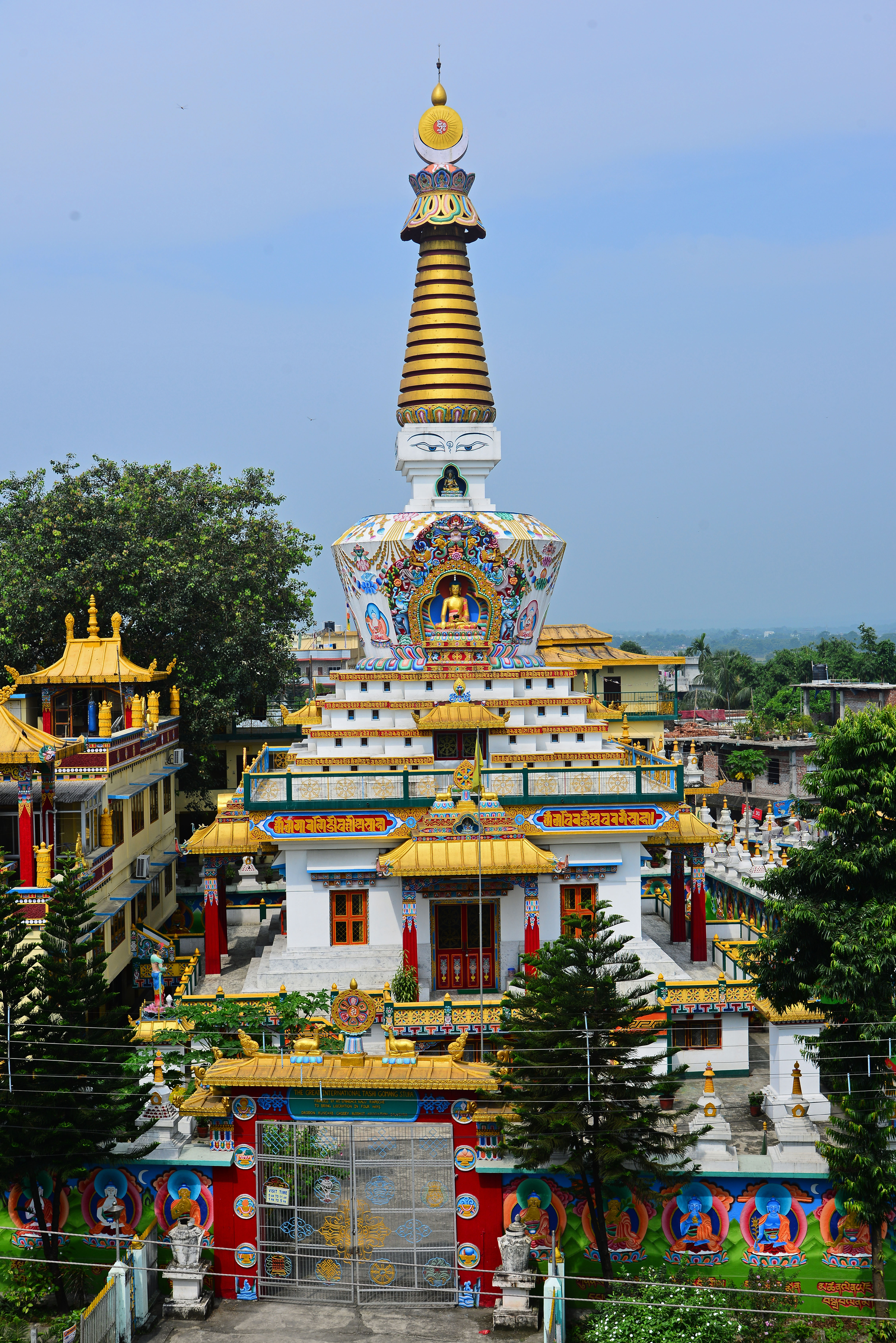
Great International Tashi Gomang Stupa monastery founded by Kalu Rinpoche at Salugara, West Bengal, India

Salugara Monastery is a Buddhist shrine on the outskirts of Siliguri in the State of West Bengal, India. The Monastery is located 6 km from the city. It was founded by Tibetan monks and followers of the Dalai Lama.

The 100 ft stupa on the monastery is believed to have been built by the Tibetan Lama, Kalu Rinpoche. This stupa is revered by the monks as it brings out five kinds of relics of Buddhism.
