= Bokar Tulku Rinpoche =

Bokar Rinpoche
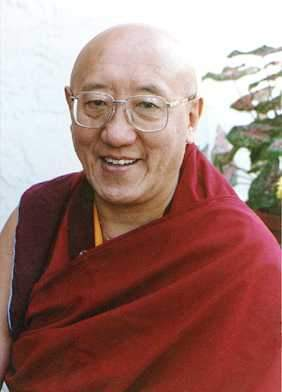

Personal life
- Born: 1940 Tibet
- Died: 17 August 2004 (aged 63–64) India
- Other name: Karma Shedrup Yongdu Pel Zangpo

Religious life
- Religion: Tibetan Buddhism
- School: Karma Kagyu, Shangpa Kagyu

Senior posting
- Teacher: Dorje Chang Kalu Rinpoche
- Predecessor: Karma Sherab Ösel
- Successor: Karma Palden Chökyi Gyaltsen Lodrö Chok Tamche Le Nampar Gyalway Lha
- Students: The Third Kalu Rinpoche

Bokar Tulku Rinpoche (Tibetan: འབོ་དཀར་སྤྲུལ་སྐུ་རིན་པོ་ཆེ་, Wylie: ’bo dkar sprul sku rin po che) (1940 – 17 August 2004) was heart-son of the Dorje Chang Kalu Rinpoche and a holder of the Karma Kagyü and Shangpa Kagyü lineages.

Rinpoche (Tibetan: རིན་པོ་ཆེ་, Wylie: rin po che, IPA: [rinˈpotʃe]) is an honorific used in Tibetan Buddhism. It means "precious one".
