= Niguma =

10th century Indian female yoga teacher

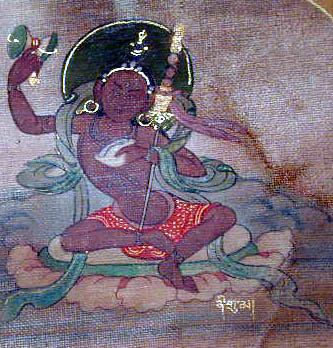
Niguma

Niguma is considered one of the most important and influential yoginis and Vajrayana teachers of the 10th or 11th century in India. She was a dakini, and one of the two female founders of the Shangpa Kagyu school of Vajrayana Buddhism, along with dakini Sukhasiddhi. Her birth name was Shrijnana (or Palgyi Yéshé in Tibetan). Like many of the mahasiddhas and Tantric practitioners of the time, Niguma was known by several names both during her lifetime and afterwards. She was called Yogini Vimalashri, or Vajradhara Niguma, or Jñana (wisdom) Dakini Adorned with Bone (ornaments), or The Sister referring to her purported relationship to the great Buddhist teacher and adept Naropa. She was also sometimes called Nigupta, which is explained by the historical Buddhist scholar Taranatha as follows: "The name Nigu accords with the Indian language, which is Nigupta, and is said to mean 'truly secret' or 'truly hidden.' In fact, it is the code-language of the dakinis of timeless awareness."

There is often confusion between the biographical details of Niguma's life and spiritual accomplishments and that of the renowned Vajrayana teacher and mahasiddha Naropa. While the biographical information for Niguma is scarce, what is available often offers details that are identical with the biography of Naropa. While not much can be confirmed about the historical details of Niguma's life, what does remain is the corpus of her teachings and her impact on the founding of the Shangpa Kagyu Buddhist spiritual lineage, known as one of the "“Eight Great Chariots of the Practice Lineages” (Wylie sgrub brgyud shing rta chen po brgyad), meaning one of the eight great Buddhist spiritual traditions that eventually were transmitted from India to Tibet. The importance of Niguma as a spiritual practitioner, teacher, and lineage founder continues to the present day.

== Life and history ==
As secret, or hidden, as her name implies, there are only a few facts known about Niguma's life. This may partially be because of genuine lack of sources from both India and Tibet as well as the nature of the dakini. One author offers this explanation:

The elusiveness of Niguma is typical of the lore of the dakini, the very embodiment of liminal spiritual experience. Additionally the difficulty of pinpointing historical information may well be due to the lack of ancient sources from India and the lack of concern about such mundane matters by the Tibetan masters who encountered her in dreams and visions and maybe in person. After all, when confronted with the blazing apparition of the resplendent and daunting dark dakini bestowing cryptic advice, a background check would be rendered irrelevant. Indian Buddhist hagiographies are virtually unknown, whether of men or women. In Tibet, where hagiography became a prolific genre in its own right, those of women are extremely rare, for all the usual reasons. It is in the experience of those heroes who encountered the dakini that one finds the most information, and these experiences are invested with the value of spiritual meaning.

What most sources agree upon is that Niguma was born into a rich Brahmin family in the town (or monastery) of Peme in Kashmir in the 10th or 11th century. Her father was named Santivarman (Tib.: Zhi ba’i go cha) and her mother was called Shrimati (Tib.: dPal gyi blo gros ma). According to different sources, Niguma was either the sister or consort of Naropa. Her family relationship with Naropa is not entirely clear from the existing sources. One scholar who has done extensive research presents and discusses the available evidence and concludes that Niguma was indeed Naropa's older sister, not his wife or consort.

== Previous incarnations ==
Niguma was considered an emanation of the great dakini Mandarava, Guru Rinpoche's foremost Indian disciple.

== Teachers ==
There is almost no information about Niguma's teachers in the extant sources. As one scholar writes:

The only specific information about Niguma's teachers that I have from my sources is her connection with a certain Lavapa, according to two accounts by Taranatha. However Lavapa is not mentioned by name in Niguma's Life Story, where it says only that 'she directly saw the truth of the nature of phenomena just by hearing some instructive advice from a few adept masters.' The only two named masters in the Life Story are Naropa and Ratnavajra, and then only as cohabitants in Kashmir.

Thus, from the perspective of the spiritual lineage, it is said that Niguma's spiritual realization originates directly from the Buddha Vajradhara, rather than from any living human teachers.

== Notable students and transmission lineages ==
=== Sukhasiddhi ===
There is some evidence that the great dakini and Vajrayana teacher Sukhasiddhi may have been a student of Niguma's. Other evidence indicates that they may never have met even while living during the same time period. Both Niguma and Sukhasiddhi were teachers of Khyungpo Neljor, and both Niguma and Sukhasiddhi are credited with the formation of the Shangpa Kagyu lineage of Vajrayana Buddhism.

=== Marpa Lotsawa, or Marpa the Translator ===
The great meditation master and translator, Marpa Lotsawa received teachings from Niguma on at least two occasions. Marpa is said to have visited Niguma each time he traveled to India. Sources say that he sought out Niguma on the advice of Naropa. The story is told thusly, in The Life of Marpa:

Naropa said, "On the shores of the poison lake in the South, in the charnel ground of Sosadvipa, is Jnanadakini Adorned with Bone Ornaments. Whoever encounters her is liberated. Go before her and request the Catuhpitha. You can also request of the kusulus there whatever teachings you desire." Having arrived in the charnel grounds at Sosadvipa, Marpa met this yogini, who was living in a woven grass dome. offering her a mandala of gold, he supplicated her. She joyfully gave him the full abhiseka and oral instructions on Catuhpitha.

Another source says that Marpa's first visit to Niguma was suggested by Naropa and that a later visit to Niguma was suggested by Shantibhadra. During the first meeting, Marpa received the Catuhpitha empowerment and instructions. During his second visit with Niguma, he received prophecy about meeting Naropa again, even though Naropa had already died.

=== Khyungpo Neljor ===
Niguma had many important students during her lifetime. The Tibetan meditation master Khyungpo Neljor (Wylie: khyung po rnal 'byor) stands out both for his intensive travel to seek teachings and transmissions from qualified masters and also for receiving the entire corpus of teachings from Niguma that would become the basis of the Shangpa Kagyu lineage. Khyungpo Neljor traveled to Nepal and India seeking teachings and transmissions from a variety of teachers, including Niguma. Some of Niguma's realization, and teaching style, can be seen in the description of Khyungpo Neljor meeting Niguma for the first time. While in India studying with various teachers, Khyungpo Neljor asked those he met if there were any teachers who had met the Buddha Vajradhara. He was told that Niguma had. So, he sought out Niguma in order to receive even higher levels of teaching from her. He found the dakini Niguma in the Sosa charnal ground of eastern India. It is traditional for a student to request teachings and transmissions three times before they are bestowed. When Khyungpo Neljor first requested transmissions, Niguma is said to have replied in the code-language of the dakinis: "I am a flesh-eating dakini!" One source says that she claimed to be the queen of the cannibals. Finally when Khyungpo Neljor again asked for transmissions, Niguma demanded gold from him. He had been traveling with great amounts of gold in order to make offerings to any teacher he met. When he offered the gold to Niguma, she threw it up into the air and it scattered throughout the forest. Then,

... her retinue of ḍākinī formed a maṇḍala, bestowing on Khyungpo Naljor the initiation of the Illusory Body (sgyu lus) and Dream Yoga, two sections that make up the Nigu Chodruk (ni gu chos drug), or Six Yogas of Niguma. Niguma then transported him to a golden mountain summit where she bestowed the complete Six Yogas, the Dorje Tsikang (rdo rje tshig rkang) and the Gyuma Lamrim (sgyu ma lam rim).

Khyungpo Naljor then returned to Tibet, and established a monastery at Zhangzhong in the Shang region in western Tsang. This was his main seat, and he became known as the Lama of Shang. Although he was reputed to have founded hundreds of monasteries and had thousands of students, he passed the teachings of Niguma to only one of his students, Mochok Rinchen Tsondru. The Shangpa lineage is often referred to as the "secret lineage" because Niguma instructed Khyungpo Neljor to transmit the teachings to only one student for the first seven generations beginning with Vajradhara and Niguma. Niguma then passed the lineage to Khyungpo Neljor who passed it to Mokchokpa Rinchen Tsondru (1110-1170). After that, Niguma's lineage went to Wonton Kyergngpa (or Chokyi Senge, 1143–1216), Sangye Nyenton (or Rigongpa, 1175-1247/1255?), and Drogon Sangye Tonpa (1207-1278). At this point, the lineage stream was opened up and teachings and practices were given to many others.

=== Thang Tong Gyalpo ===
The famous architect, scholar, and yogi Thang Tong Gyalpo (1385–1464CE or 1361–1485CE) was one of Niguma's students, yet in a unique way. He was instructed by Niguma in a vision two to three centuries after she lived. He is well known for being a great Buddhist adept, a yogi, physician, blacksmith, architect, and a pioneering civil engineer. He is considered a reincarnation of Dolpopa Sherab Gyaltsen and founded the Iron Chain lineage (Wylie: thang lugs) of the Shangpa Kagyu school of Tibetan Buddhism which was founded by Niguma.

== Teachings and spiritual practices ==
=== Overview ===
The legacy of Niguma's teachings and spiritual practices is still available today within the Shangpa Kagyu tradition. Included in the corpus are songs and prayers (including aspiration prayers), a sadhana cycle called The Six Dharmas of Niguma (see below), mahamudra practices, as well as unique sadhana practice cycles for Chakrasamvara, and Hevajra.

=== The Six Dharmas of Niguma or The Six Yogas of Niguma? ===
Niguma brought forth a tantric sadhana cycle, a cohesive set of spiritual practices, referred to properly as the Vajra Lines of the Six Dharmas, sometimes also referred to as the Six Yogas of Niguma. This is a parallel to the more well known Six Yogas of Naropa. Yet, for both Niguma's and Naropa's Vajrayana sadhana cycles, it is more accurate to use the term six dharmas.

"The term yoga (sbyor ba) is never used for this set of practices in Tibetan, and they should not be confused with the Kālacaka tradition's group of six practices that are called yogas."

Her six dharmas are as:
1.Inner fire (gtum mo)
2. Illusory body (rgyud lus)
3. Dreaming (rmi lam)
4. Clear light ('od gsal)
5. Transference of consciousness ('pho ba)
6. Intermediate state (bar do).

The Six Dharmas of Niguma are classified as completion stage (rdzogs rim) practices focusing on controlling and refining the channels, winds, and energies of the subtle body. Details of the sadhana cycle brought forth by Niguma can be found in Selected Works of the Dalai Lama: The Tantric Yogas of Sister Niguma (Mullin (1985)). An interesting comparison of The Six Dharmas of Niguma with The Six Dharmas of Naropa can be found in Niguma: Lady of Illusion (Harding (2010), pp. 135–136).
