= Sukhasiddhi =

Indian Buddhist lama

Sukhasiddhi (flourished 11th Century) was an Indian teacher of Vajrayana Buddhism, a yogini and master of meditation. She was born in west Kashmir to a large, poor family. A mother of three sons and three daughters, she once gave a beggar the only food in the house and was expelled from home.

She traveled to Oḍḍiyāna, thought to be the land of dakas and dakinis, and there she met Virupa, a mahasiddha who became her guru. Sukhasiddhi quickly became completely realized and together with Niguma, as well as Rāhula, Maitripada and Vajrasapana, was the root teacher of the Tibetan yogi Khungpo Naljor, who founded the Shangpa Kagyu school of Tibetan Buddhism.
