= Shangpa Kagyu =

Lineage of the Kagyu school of Tibetan Buddhism

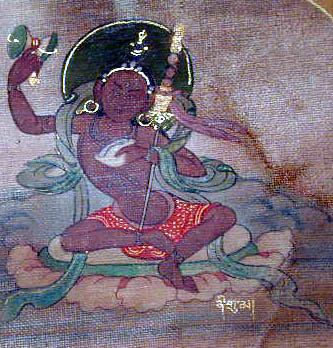
Niguma

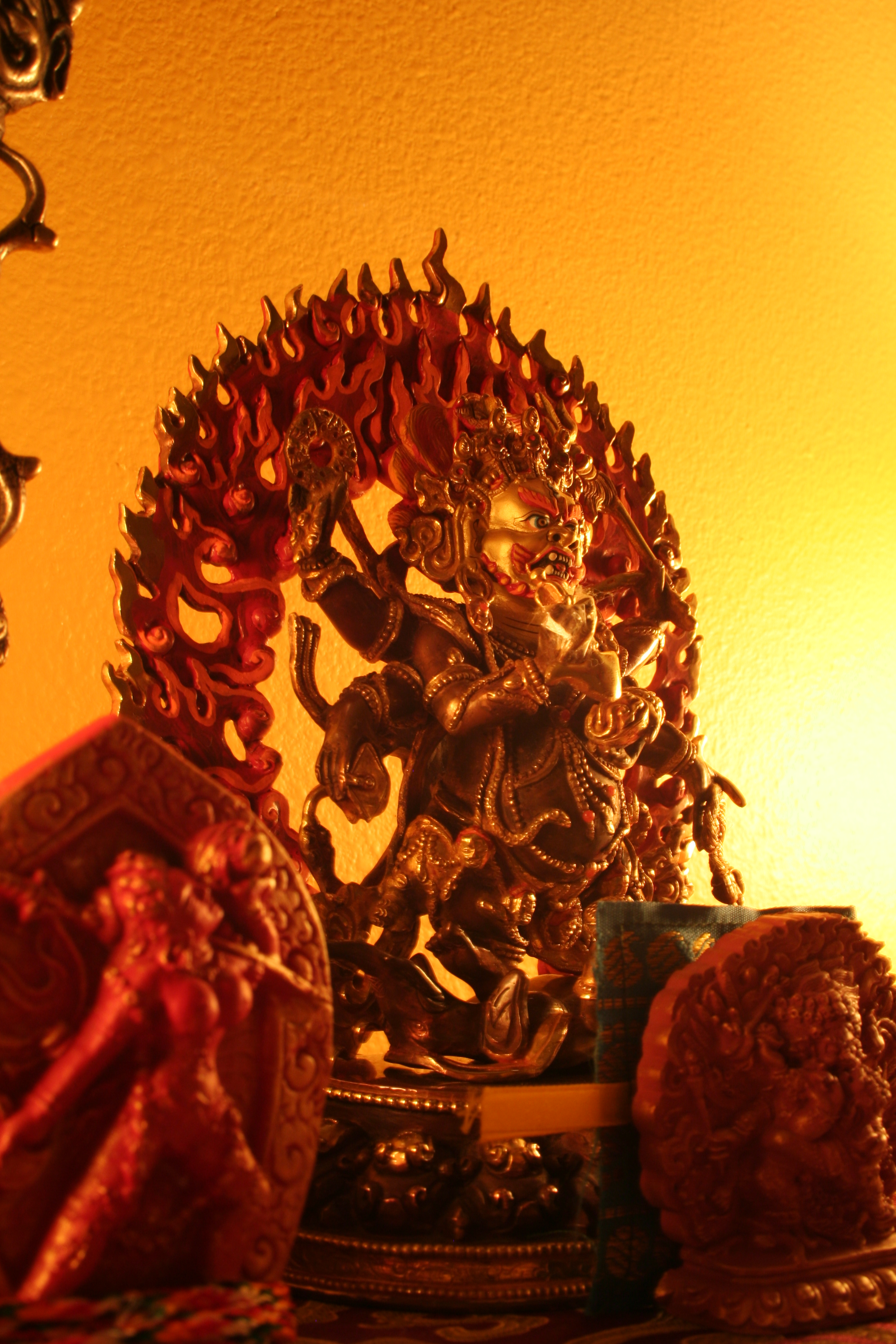
The principal Shangpa dharmapala, the six-armed Mahākāla

The Shangpa Kagyu (Tibetan: ཤངས་པ་བཀའ་བརྒྱུད, Wylie: shangs pa bka' brgyud, "Oral Tradition of the man from Shang") is known as the "secret lineage" of the Kagyu school of Vajrayana or Tibetan Buddhism and differs in origin from the better known Dagpo Kagyu schools. The Dagpo Kagyu are the lineage of Tilopa through his student Naropa, often traced through Naropa's famous student Marpa Lotsawa and thus called "Marpa Kagyu", while the Shangpa lineage descends from Tilopa's student Niguma, who was Naropa's sister, as well as from the teachings of Sukhasiddhi. Its founder was Khyungpo Naljor, the student of both women, whose monastery in the Shang Valley gave its name to the tradition.

The principal Shangpa dharmapala is the six-armed Mahākāla.

The Shangpa tradition was revitalized in the 20th century by the first Kalu Rinpoche, who had many students both in Tibet and in the West.

== Origins ==
The Shangpa Kagyu lineage was founded by the eleventh-century Tibetan scholar Khyungpo Naljor. Seeking to increase his understanding of the teachings he received in Tibet, he traveled to India, where he met the female mystic yogini, Niguma. (Vajradhara Niguma is the full Tibetan name of the Indian yogini Vimalashri. He received many teachings from her; in particular, the teachings of a special tradition of Mahamudra and the Six Yogas of Niguma, which are similar but not identical to the Six Dharmas of Naropa. Khyungpo Naljor was a Tibetan yogi and Bonpo and Niguma's most famous disciple. He was the only one to whom she imparted her most secret teachings. He also met and studied with the dakini Sukhasiddhi, another female mystic and student of the mahasiddha Virūpa, as well as Vajrāsana, Maitripada, Rāhula, and others.

Thang Tong Gyalpo was another famous yogi instructed by Niguma in a vision. He started his own religious tradition (Wylie: thang lugs) within the Shangpa Kagyu lineage.

On his return to Tibet in 1121, Khyungpo Naljor established Zhangzhung Dorjeden monastery at Shang in Tsang. This was his main seat, and he became known as the Lama of Shang. Although he was reputed to have founded hundreds of monasteries and had thousands of students, he passed the teachings of Niguma to only one of his students, Mochok Rinchen Tsondru. The Shangpa lineage is often referred to as the "secret lineage" because Niguma instructed Khyungpo Neljor to transmit the teachings to only one student for the first seven generations beginning with Vajradhara and Niguma.

From Mochok Rinchen Tsondru, the lineage was passed to Kyergang Chokyi Senge, Nyenton Rigung Chokyi Sherab, and Songjay Tenpa Tsondru Senge. These first seven teachings are known as the Seven Great Jewels of the Shangpa tradition. Songjay Tenpa was the first teacher who gave these instructions to more than one of his disciples, and from this point on, several different lines of transmission developed. The intention for keeping the lineage secret in this fashion was to protect it from becoming an established monastic tradition. As one of the more esoteric traditions, it was meant to be practiced rather than codified.

Although the Shangpa teachings were highly regarded and were assimilated by many schools, the tradition itself ceased to exist as an independent school with the dissolution of the Jonangpas in the 17th century. However, its teachings were still practiced and transmitted. In the 19th century Jamgon Kongtrul gathered together the surviving transmissions and ensured their continued survival by including them in his Treasury of Key Instructions.

The lineage transmission has also been incorporated into the Sakya school and other Kagyu schools. Je Tsongkhapa, who founded the Gelug school, was also versed in the doctrine of the Shangpa Kagyu.

=== Modern lineage holders ===
In the west, the principal teacher of the Shangpa Kagyu lineage was the first Kalu Rinpoche. He received the lineage teachings in the early 1940s when he went for training at Tsa Tsa Monastery in Eastern Tibet. He trained with the Abbot of the monastery, the 8th Tsa Tsa Drubgen, Yizhin Norbu, also called Karma Singhe and the White Crown Master. The Karma Kagyu regent Tai Situpa described Yizhin Norbu as “one of the most learned and accomplished Kagyu masters now living.”

There, Kalu Rinpoche received the complete cycle of the Shangpa teachings during a closed retreat. Tsa Tsa monastery is also a major Dakpo Kagyu Centre and preserves the Rimé movement. The Tsa Tsa Drubgen Yizhin Norbu died in the middle of June, 2005. The Shangpa traditions are currently held by his regent and successor the second Gyalten Thongwa Rangdrol.

After the first Kalu Rinpoche died his student Bokar Tulku Rinpoche became the main lineage holder. After Bokar Tulku Rinpoche died, Yangsi Kalu, a young tulku who finished a Shangpa three-year retreat in September 2008, became the holder of the seat of the lineage (the monastery of Sonada in northern India). The other current holders of the Shangpa lineage are the lamas who have been entrusted by Vajradhara Kalu Rangjung Künchab, for example Norlha Rinpoche, Denys Rinpoche, as well as Ven Mogchok Rinpoche currently living and teaching in France. A list of Kalu Rangjung Kunchab contemporary heirs is available on Shangpa Resource center web Site

Wangchen Rinpoche is a current lineage holder, who was recognized by Dorje Chang Kalu Rinpoche as “Kalu the Younger”, his meditation companion in Tibet.

== Practice and doctrine ==
There are many unique teachings in the Shangpa tradition, but the most important are "The Five Golden Teachings", also called the Five Golden Doctrines of the Shangpas (Wylie: shangs pa gser chos lnga), a group of teachings envisioned as forming a tree.

1. The innermost teachings are the "Six Yogas of Niguma" or more properly called "Six Dharmas of Niguma" (Tibetan: ནི་གུའི་ཆོས་དྲུག་, Wylie: ni gu'i chos drug, THL: ni gü chö druk), which are very similar to the Six Yogas of Naropa practiced by the Dagpo schools. The Six Dharmas of Niguma include the teachings on tummo (inner fire), illusory body yoga, dream yoga, clear light yoga (sheer clarity), phowa (consciousness transference), and bardo (the intermediary state between death and birth) yoga.
2. The next tier includes "The Locket Tradition of Mahamudra" which combines the mahamudra teachings of Niguma, Maitripa, and Sukhasiddhi.
3. The teachings on the three methods of carrying one's understanding from meditation into daily activities.
4. The practice of development and completion with the white and red dakinis.
5. The teaching of the deathless nature of mind and body.

== See also ==
- Kyabje Kalu Rinpoche
