= Kalu Rinpoche =

Tibetan lama

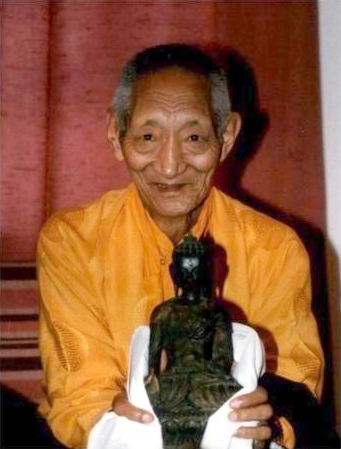
- Kalu Rinpoche in 1987 at Kagyu Rintchen Tcheu Ling in Montpellier, France

Personal life
- Born: c. 1905 Kham, Eastern Tibet
- Died: May 10, 1989 (age 84) Sonada Monastery, Darjeeling West Bengal India
- Occupation: Lama

Religious life
- Religion: Tibetan Buddhism
- School: Kagyu
- Lineage: Shangpa Kagyu, Karma Kagyu

Senior posting
- Students: Bokar Tulku Rinpoche; Reting Rinpoche; 16th Gyalwang Karmapa

Kalu Rinpoche (1905 – May 10, 1989) was a Tibetan Buddhist lama, meditation master, scholar and teacher. He was one of the first Tibetan masters to teach in the West.

== Early life and teachers ==
Kalu Rinpoche was born in 1905 during the Female Wood Snake year of the Tibetan lunar calendar in the district of Treshö Gang chi Rawa in the Hor region of Kham, Eastern Tibet.

When Kalu Rinpoche was fifteen years old, he was sent to begin his higher studies at the monastery of Palpung, the foremost center of the Karma Kagyu school. He remained there for more than a decade, during which time he mastered the vast body of teaching that forms the philosophical basis of Buddhist practice, and completed two three-year retreats.

At about the age of twenty-five, Rinpoche left Palpung to pursue the life of a solitary yogi in the woods of the Khampa countryside. For nearly fifteen years, he strove to perfect his realization of all aspects of the teachings and he became renowned in the villages and among the nomads as a representative of the Bodhisattva path.

== Teaching activity in Tibet ==
Kalu Rinpoche returned to Palpung to receive final teachings from Drupon Norbu Dondrup, who entrusted him with the rare transmission of the teaching of the Shangpa Kagyu. At the order of Situ Rinpoche, he was appointed Vajra Master of the great meditation hall of Palpung Monastery, where for many years he gave empowerments and teachings.

During the 1940s, Kalu Rinpoche visited central Tibet with the party of Situ Rinpoche, and there he taught extensively. His disciples included the Reting Rinpoche, regent of Tibet during the infancy of the Fourteenth Dalai Lama.

Returning to Kham, Kalu Rinpoche became the abbot of the meditation center associated with Palpung and the meditation teacher of the Sixteenth Gyalwa Karmapa. He remained in that position until the situation in Tibet forced him into exile in India.

== In exile ==
Kalu Rinpoche left Tibet for Bhutan in 1955, before establishing a monastery in Sonada, Darjeeling in 1965. The monastery was near Rumtek, the seat of Rangjung Rigpe Dorje, 16th Karmapa.

In the late 1960s Kalu Rinpoche began to attract Western disciples in India. By the 1970s, he was teaching extensively in the Americas and Europe, and during his three visits to the West he founded teaching centers in over a dozen countries. In France, he established the first retreat center to teach the traditional three-year retreats of the Shangpa and Karma Kagyu lineages to Western students.

== Controversy ==
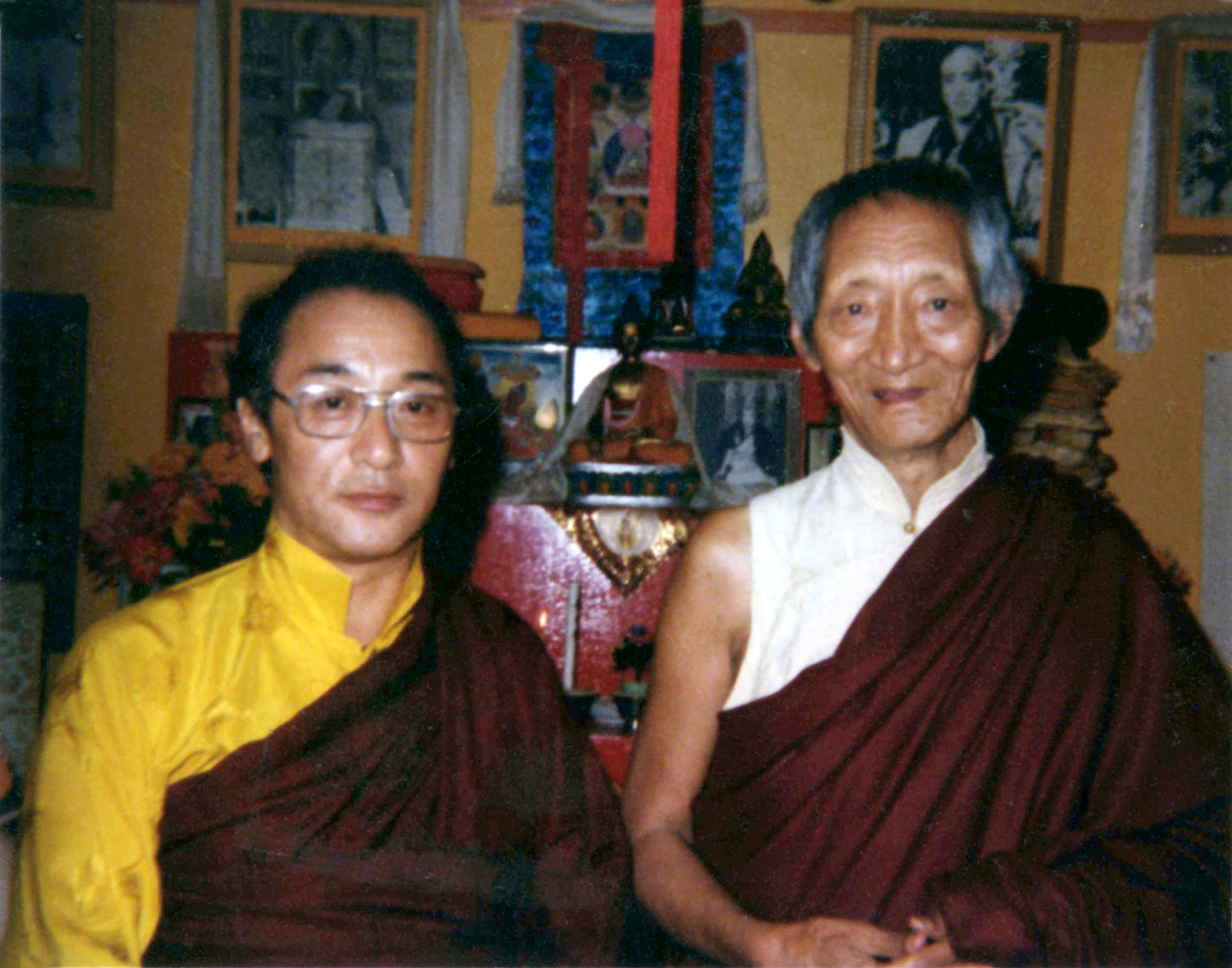
His Holiness Jigdal Dagchen Sakya Rinpoche and His Eminence Kyabje Kalu Rinpoche, Wallingford, Seattle, Washington, USA in 1978

June Campbell, a former Kagyu nun who is a feminist scholar, acted as Kalu Rinpoche's translator for several years. In her book Traveller in Space: Gender, Identity and Tibetan Buddhism, she writes that she consented to participate in what she realised later was an abusive sexual relationship with him, which he told her was tantric spiritual practice. She raises the same theme in a number of interviews, including one with Tricycle magazine in 1996. Since the book was published she has received "letters from women all over the world with similar and worse experiences" with other gurus.

== Second Kalu Rinpoche ==
At 3:00 p.m., Wednesday, May 10, 1989, Kalu Rinpoche died at his monastery in Sonada, the Darjeeling District in West Bengal, India. On September 17, 1990, Rinpoche's tulku was born in Darjeeling, India, to Lama Gyaltsen and his wife Drolkar. Lama Gyaltsen had served since his youth as his secretary.

The former Kalu Rinpoche believes he chose the vessel for his reincarnation. The Tai Situpa Pema Tönyö Nyinje officially recognized Kalu Rinpoche's yangsi (young reincarnation) on March 25, 1992, explaining that he had received definite signs from Kalu Rinpoche himself. Situ Rinpoche sent a letter of recognition with Lama Gyaltsen to the 14th Dalai Lama, who immediately confirmed the recognition.

On February 28, 1993, Yangsi Kalu Rinpoche was enthroned at Samdrup Tarjayling. The Tai Situpa and Goshir Gyaltsap presided over the ceremony, assisted by Kalu Rinpoche's heart-son, Bokar Tulku Rinpoche. The Tai Situpa performed the hair-cutting ceremony and bestowed on the young tulku the name Karma Ngedön Tenpay Gyaltsen — Victory Banner of the Teachings of the True Meaning. He is now known as the Second Kalu Rinpoche. (In the USA Kagyu organization, Karma Triyana Dharmachakra, recognizes Yangsi Kalu Rinpoche (1990 to present) as the third Kalu Rinpoche; and Kalu Rinpoche is listed as the second Kalu Rinpoche.)

In the fall of 2011, Kalu Yangsi gave a talk at the University of British Columbia in Vancouver. At the end of the talk, a student in the audience asked for his perspective on the sexual abuse and sexualisation of children in the west. Kalu disclosed he was abused, paused then broke down, revealing for the first time that he had been sexually abused at the age of 12 by older monks from the monastery he attended. Shortly after that he posted a video on YouTube so that the story would not become unsubstantiated gossip.

== Bibliography ==
- Foundations of Tibetan Buddhism, Snow Lion Publications, 2004, ISBN 1-55939-212-6
- Luminous Mind : Fundamentals of Spiritual Practice, Wisdom Publications, 1996, ISBN 0-86171-118-1
- Gently Whispered: Oral Teachings by the Very Venerable Kalu Rinpoche, Station Hill Press, 1995, ISBN 0-88268-153-2
- Excellent Buddhism: An Exemplary Life, Clearpoint Press, 1995, ISBN 0-9630371-4-5
- Profound Buddhism: From Hinayana to Vajrayana, Clearpoint Press, 1995, ISBN 0-9630371-5-3
- Secret Buddhism: Vajrayana Practices, Clearpoint Press, 2002, ISBN 0-9630371-6-1
- The Dharma: That Illuminates All Beings Like the Light of the Sun and the Moon, State University of New York Press, 1986, ISBN 0-88706-157-5
- The Gem Ornament of Manifold Oral Instructions Which Benefits Each and Everyone Appropriately Snow Lion, 1987, ISBN 0-937938-59-9

== See also ==
- Buddhism in America
- Salugara Monastery
