= Japanese Mongolian =

Japanese Mongolian or Mongolian Japanese may refer to:

- Japanese-Mongolian relations
- Japanese people in Mongolia
- Mongolians in Japan
- Japanese language education in Mongolia
- Mongolian language education in Japan
- Multiracial people of Japanese and Mongolian descent
