= Christopher P. Atwood =

American scholar

- Born: Christopher Pratt Atwood; United States of America
- Citizenship: American

Academic background
- Education: Harvard University (Artium Baccalaureus); Indiana University, Bloomington (MA); Indiana University, Bloomington (PhD)
- Thesis: Revolutionary Nationalist Mobilization in Inner Mongolia, 1925-1929 (1990)

Academic work
- Discipline: History, Mongolian Studies, Chinese Studies, Tibetan Studies
- Institutions: University of Pennsylvania; Indiana University; Inner Mongolia University; U.S. State Department

Christopher Pratt Atwood is an American scholar of Mongolian and Chinese history. Currently the Chair of the University of Pennsylvania's East Asian Languages and Civilizations Department, he has authored six books and published more than 100 articles on a wide variety of topics. Historian Timothy May described him as a leading scholar of Mongolian studies in Western Hemisphere.

Atwood is a recipient of the Order of the Polar Star, awarded by the President of Mongolia and Onon Prize, awarded by the University of Cambridge Mongolia and Inner Asia Studies Unit, and holds honorary doctorates from the Mongolian Academy of Sciences and the National University of Mongolia.

== Education ==
Christopher Atwood received a Bachelor's degree at Harvard University, where he studied Tibetan, Mongolian and Chinese. He holds a Master's from Indiana University Bloomington, where he also obtained Ph.D. in Mongolian Studies, History and East Asian Languages and Cultures.

== Career ==
Early in his career, Atwood worked for U.S. State Department and was a visiting scholar at Inner Mongolia University. He later taught at Indiana University from 1996 to 2016, serving as department chair and interim director of the Center for Languages of the Central Asian Region. In 2016, he joined the University of Pennsylvania, where he is Chair of the East Asian Languages and Civilizations Department. He has been actively interviewed by and consulted with the US government, American, Asian and European universities, international academic and professional associations and media on modern affairs and history and cultural aspects of Mongolia and China. The American military historian Timothy May described him as a leading scholar of Mongolian studies in Western Hemisphere.

Atwood was awarded Honorary doctorate of National University of Mongolia in 2019 and Honorary Doctorate, conferred by the Institute of History, Academy of Sciences of Mongolia, in 2011 for his significant contributions to Mongolian studies. The President of Mongolia awarded him the Order of the Polar Star on July 11, 2011. His work and contributions were recognized by several institutions, including Onon Prize by the University of Cambridge, Teaching Excellence Recognition Award (1998–99 and 2003–04); Indiana University Trustees Teaching Award (2000–01 and 2001–02); John G. Hangin Memorial Prize for Mongolian Studies; Denis Sinor Prize for best graduate paper in the Central Eurasian Studies Department.

He has authored six books and published more than 100 articles and chapters in areas of history, ethnography, linguistics and politics. His book Encyclopedia of Mongolia and the Mongol Empire was widely praised by scholars and readers interested in Asian history.

Based on Christopher Atwood's new translation of The Secret History of the Mongols, a docuseries titled "Genghis Khan: The Secret History of the Mongols" was released on 1 May 2025.

== Books ==
- The Secret History of the Mongols, Penguin Classics, 2023. ISBN 9780241197912
- The Rise of the Mongols: Five Chinese Sources. Indianapolis, IN: Hackett Publishing Company, Inc., 2021.
- co-edited with Timothy May and Bayarsaikhan Dashdondog. New Approaches to Ilkhanid History, (Leiden, The Netherlands: Brill, 12 Nov. 2020) doi: https://doi.org/10.1163/9789004438217
- Encyclopedia of Mongolia and the Mongol Empire. New York (NY): Facts on File, 2004. ISBN 0-8160-4671-9
- Young Mongols and Vigilantes in Inner Mongolia's Interregnum Decades, 1911-1931, (Leiden, The Netherlands: Brill, 04 Oct. 2022) doi: https://doi.org/10.1163/9789004531291
- co-edited with Ákos Bertalan Apatóczky. Philology of the Grasslands, (Leiden, The Netherlands: Brill, 16 Jan. 2018) doi: https://doi.org/10.1163/9789004351981

== Selected articles and chapters ==
- “The Empire of the Great Khan: The Yuan Ulus, 1260–1368,” in The Cambridge History of the Mongol Empire, edited by Michal Biran and Hodong Kim, 107–80. Cambridge: Cambridge University Press, 2023.
- "Arctic Ivory and the Routes North from the Tang to the Mongol Empires." Quaderni di Studi Indo-Mediterranei no. 12 (2019–20): 471-502.
- “Buddhists as Natives: Changing Positions in the Religious Ecology of the Mongol Yuan Dynasty.” The Middle Kingdom and the Dharma Wheel, 2016, 278–321. doi:10.1163/9789004322585_007.
- “Imperial Itinerance and Mobile Pastoralism.” Inner Asia 17(2), 2015:293-349. DOI:10.1163/22105018-12340046
- "Pu'a's Boast and Doqolqu's Death: Historiography of a Hidden Scandal in the Mongol Conquest of the Jin" Journal of Song-Yuan Studies 45, 2015, pp. 239–278. DOI: https://doi.org/10.1353/sys.2015.0006
- "Jochi and the early Western campaigns." in How Mongolia Matters: War, Law, and Society, pp. 35–56. Brill, 2017.
- "The Qai, the Khongai, and the Names of the Xiōngnú" International Journal of Eurasian Studies 2, 2015.
- "Banner, otog, thousand: appanage communities as the basic unit of traditional Mongolian society." Mongolian Studies 34 (2012): 1-76.
- "Soviet Russia and Imperial Japan: A Comparison of Their Ventures on the Mongolian Plateau," in ノモンハン事件（ハルハ河会戦）70周年 2009年ウランバートル国際シンポジウム 報告論文集 [“Collected Papers from the International Symposium on the 70th Anniversary of the Nomonhan Incident (Khalkhin Gol Battle), held in Ulaanbaatar, 2009”], ed. Junko IMANISHI今西淳子 and Borjigin HUSEL, pp. 385–92. Tokyo: Fūkyōsha, 2010.
- "Mongols, Arabs, Kurds, and Franks: Rashīd al-Dīn’s comparative ethnography of tribal society." Rashīd al-Dīn as an agent and mediator of cultural exchanges in Ilkhanid Iran (2013): 223-50.
- "Huns and Xiongnu: New thoughts on an old problem." (2012).
- "The Notion of Tribe in Medieval China: Ouyang Xiu and the Shatuo Dynastic Myth." Miscellanea Asiatica: Festschrift in Honour of Françoise Aubin (2010): 593-621.
- "Ulus emirs, Keshig elders, signatures and marriage partners: The evolution of a classical Mongol institution,’ in D. Sneath (ed.), Imperial Statecraft (Bellingham WA: Center of East Asian Studies, Western Washingtoon University, 2006), 141-74.
- "Validation by holiness or sovereignty: religious toleration as political theology in the Mongol world empire of the thirteenth century." The International History Review 26, no. 2 (2004): 237-256.
- "Inner Mongolian Nationalism in the 1920s: A Survey of Documentary Information." Twentieth-Century China 25, no. 2 (1999): 75-113.
- "Sino-Soviet Diplomacy and the Second Partition of Mongolia, 1945–1946." In Mongolia in the Twentieth Century, pp. 137–161. Routledge, 2015
- “Titles, Appanages, Marriages, and Officials: A Comparison of Political Forms in the Zünghar and Thirteenth-Century Mongol Empires.” Imperial Statecraft. Political Forms and Techniques of Governance, 2006.
- “The Mutual-Aid Co-Operatives and the Animal Products Trade in Mongolia, 1913–1928.” Inner Asia 5, no. 1 (2003): 65–91. doi:10.1163/146481703793647424.
- “National Party and Local Politics in Ordos.” Journal of Asian History, 1992.
- “National Questions and National Answers in the Chinese Revolution; Or, How Do You Say Minzu in Mongolian.” Indiana University East Asian Working Paper Series on Language and Politics in modern China, 1994.
