= Mongolians in Japan =

Ethnic group

- (Mongolia) (Japan)
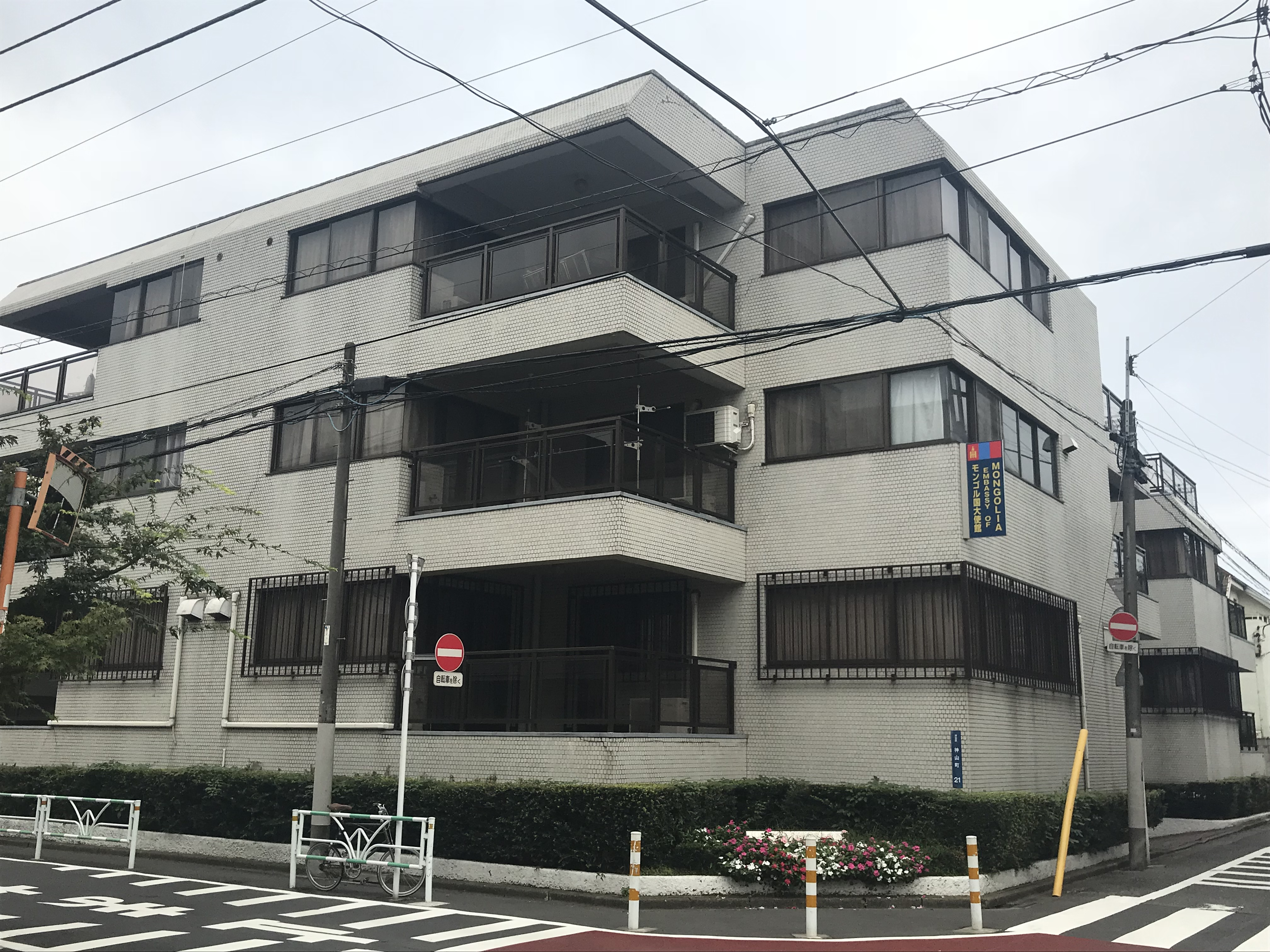
- The Embassy of Mongolia in Japan

Total population
- 21,359 (In December, 2025)

Languages
- Japanese, Mongolian

Mongolians in Japan

Japanese name
- Kanji: 在日モンゴル人
Transcriptions
- Romanization: Zainichi Mongorujin

Mongolian name
- Mongolian: Япон дахь Монголчууд; Yapon dakhi Mongolchuud 日本ダヒ モンゴルチュード

There is a small community of Mongolians in Japan, representing a minor portion of emigration from Mongolia. In December 2025, there were 21,359 registered Mongolian citizens in Japan, up from 2,545 in 2003.

== Students ==
International students form a large proportion of the registered population of Mongolians in Japan. The earliest Mongol exchange students, three women, came to Japan in 1906, when Mongolia was still ruled by the Qing Dynasty. Japan was also a popular destination for students from Mengjiang, in today's Inner Mongolia, in the late 1930s and early 1940s. Among them were several who became famous scholars, such as Chinggeltei, Urgunge Onon, and John Gombojab Hangin.

In 1974, Japan and the Mongolian People's Republic agreed to send exchange students to each other. In 1976, the first Mongolian student arrived under the agreement. In 2006, 1,006 Mongolian students were studying in Japanese institutions of higher education.

In 2005, aside from Mongolian citizens, there were roughly 4,000 members of the Chakhar-speaking Mongol minority of China in Japan. Like migrants from Mongolia proper, they came mostly on student visas, beginning in the 1990s, sponsored by professors of Mongolian studies at Japanese universities. They are a close-knit community, living mostly in the Nerima and Sugamo areas of Tokyo. In many cases, the same apartment has been occupied serially by successive migrants for more than a decade, with each passing the lease on to another migrant before leaving Japan or moving on to different accommodation.

There are also Buryats and Kalmyks that have immigrated to Japan from the former Soviet Union.

== Sumo wrestlers ==
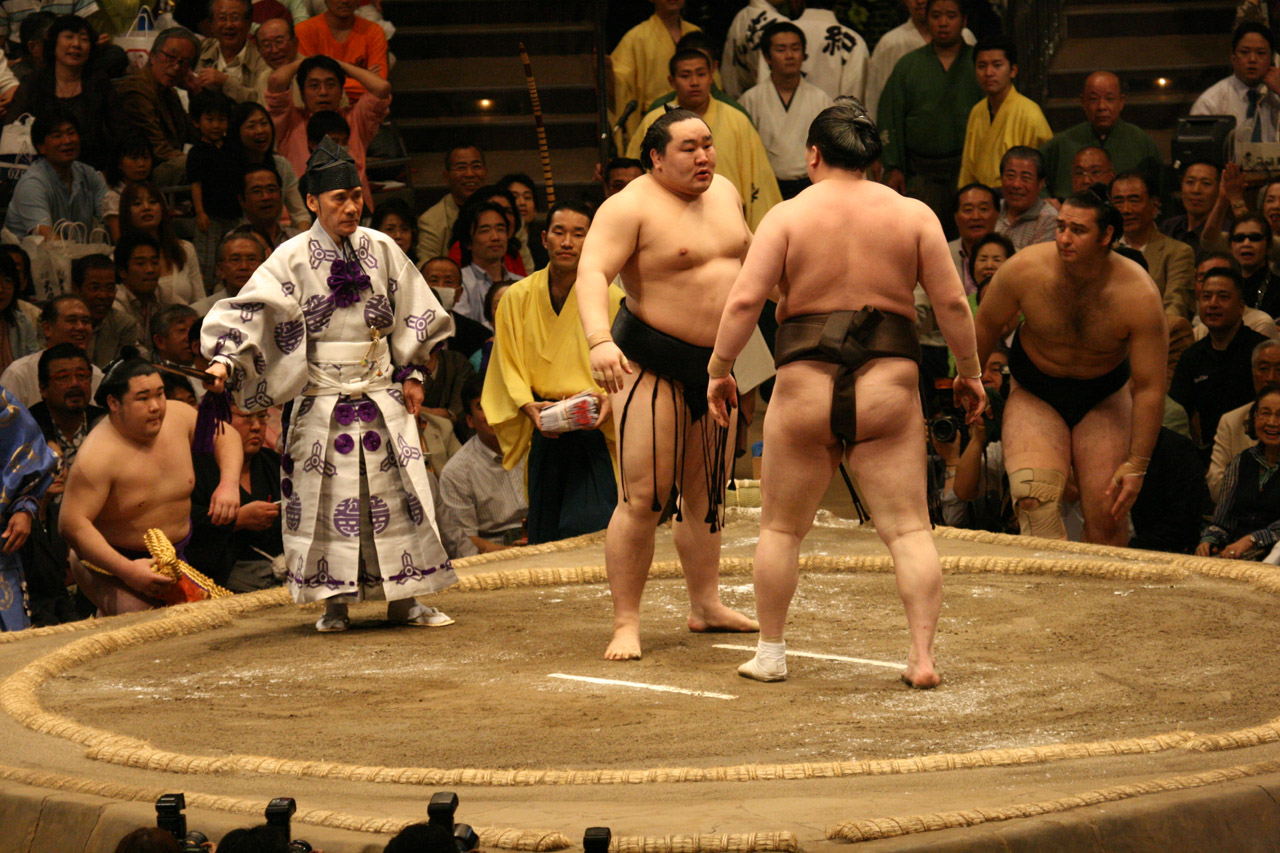
Asashōryū Akinori and Hakuhō Shō glaring at each other

Since the 1990s, Mongolians have become prominent in sumo. In 2005, Mongolians composed roughly 5% of all ranked sumo wrestlers, making them more than 60% (37 out of 61) of non-Japanese rikishi in Japan. In a 2009 survey, of the four sumo wrestlers named as most famous by Japanese people, three were Mongolian.

Sumo bears similarities with Mongolian wrestling—the traditional sport of Mongolia. Mongolians are noted for their sturdy frames and large stature, which is part of the reason they often partake in contact sports such as sumo.

== Notable people ==
- Asashōryū Akinori, originally Dolgorsuren Dagvadorj, sumo wrestler
- Hakuhō Shō, originally Mönkhbatyn Davaajargal, sumo wrestler
- Kyokutenhō Masaru, originally Tsebeknyam Nyamjyab, sumo wrestler
- Kyokutenzan Takeshi, originally Enkhbat Batmunkh, sumo wrestler
- Harumafuji Kōhei, originally Davaanyamyn Byambadorj, sumo wrestler

== See also ==
- Japanese language education in Mongolia
- Japan–Mongolia relations
- Mongol invasions of Japan
