= Baochang =

Baochang may refer to:

== Towns ==
- Baochang, Taibus Banner (宝昌镇), Inner Mongolia
- Baochang, Haimen (包场镇), in Haimen City, Jiangsu

== People ==
- Baochang (monk) (466–518? CE), Buddhist monk of Wu
