= Erdne Ombadykow =

Kalmyk-American Buddhist lama (born 1972)

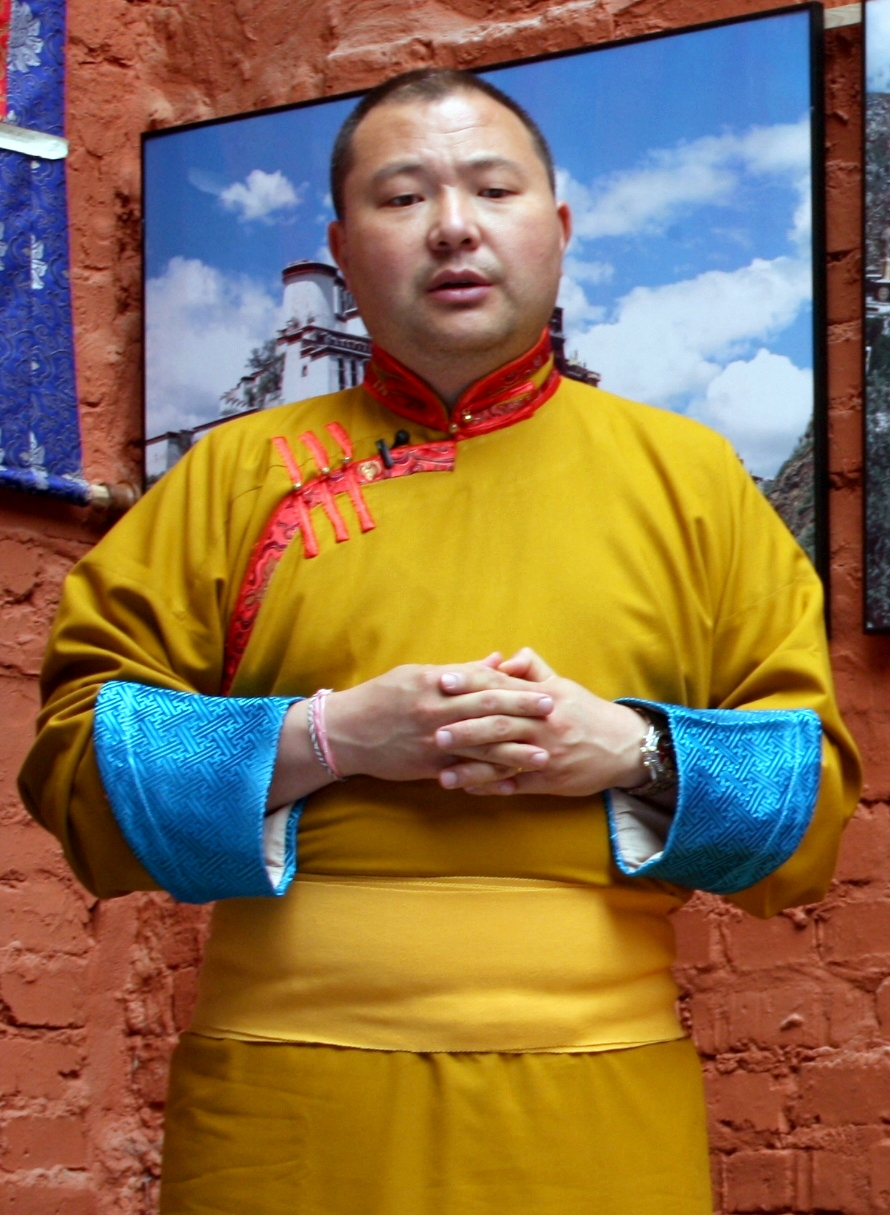
- Telo Tulku Rinpoche in 2011

Šajin Lama of Kalmykia
- In office 1992 – 28 January 2023
- Preceded by: Office re-established Lubsan Sharab Tepkin (until 1931)
- Succeeded by: Tenzin Choidak

Personal life
- Born: 27 October 1972 (age 54) Philadelphia, Pennsylvania, United States

Religious life
- Religion: Tibetan Buddhism
- Temple: Drepung Gomang Monastery
- School: Gelug

Senior posting
- Predecessor: Diluwa Khutugtu Jamsrangjab
- Reincarnation: Tilopa

Telo Tulku Rinpoche (born Erdne-Basan Ombadykow; (Note: Oirat: Омбадһа Эрдн-Басң, romanized: Ombadha Erdn-Basñ, [ombadəˈɣa ɛrdˈnə baˈsəŋk]; Russian: Эрдни Басангович Омбадыков, romanized: Erdni Basangovich Ombadykov, [ɪrdˈnʲi bɐˈsanɡəvʲɪt͡ɕ ɐmbəˈdɨkəf]. His religious name is written in Russian as Тэло Тулку Ринпоче.) 27 October 1972) is a Kalmyk-American Tibetan Buddhist lama. He was the Šajin Lama (Note: Oirat: Шаҗн лама, romanized: Şacn lama, [ʃaˈd͡ʒən ˈlama]; also spelled Shajin Lama.) (supreme lama) of Kalmykia, the head of the republic's Buddhists, from 1992 to 2023, and the Dalai Lama's honorary representative to Russia, Mongolia and the Commonwealth of Independent States from 2015 to 2026.

Born in Philadelphia, he trained as a monk at Drepung Gomang Monastery in India from the age of seven and was recognized by the Dalai Lama as a tulku in a line traced to the Indian master Tilopa. He first visited Kalmykia with the Dalai Lama in 1991 and was elected Šajin Lama the following year, restoring an office dating back to 1639 that had been abolished during the Soviet repression of the 1930s. More than 30 Buddhist temples and prayer houses were built in the republic while he held the office, among them the Golden Abode of Shakyamuni Buddha in Elista. When Russia stopped granting the Dalai Lama visas, he and the Buryat lama Yelo Rinpoche initiated annual teachings by the Dalai Lama for Russian Buddhists in India from 2009, later also held in Latvia. As the Dalai Lama's representative, he also coordinated a series of dialogues between the Dalai Lama and Russian scientists.

In 2022, after leaving Russia for Mongolia, he publicly condemned the Russian invasion of Ukraine, the first religious leader in Russia to do so. He resigned as Šajin Lama in January 2023, after Russia's Ministry of Justice designated him a "foreign agent".

== Early life ==
Telo Tulku Rinpoche was born Erdne Ombadykow in Philadelphia, the youngest of nine children, in a family of Kalmyk Cossack émigrés. In a 2007 interview, he said his family had wanted one of their sons to become a monk and that he had shown the most interest. In 1979, he met the 14th Dalai Lama in New York, and the Dalai Lama recommended that he train at Drepung Gomang Monastery in southern India. He went there in 1980, at the age of seven.

As a child, he was recognized by the Dalai Lama as the reincarnation of the Mongolian lama Diluwa Khutugtu Jamsrangjab, whose line of incarnations is traced back to the Indian mahasiddha Tilopa, and was given the name Telo Rinpoche. He studied at Drepung Gomang for 13 years and completed the Parchin Rabjamba degree.

== Election as Šajin Lama ==
In the summer of 1991, shortly before the dissolution of the Soviet Union, Telo Tulku Rinpoche visited Kalmykia for the first time as part of the Dalai Lama's delegation. Kalmykia, a republic of the Russian Federation, is the only predominantly Buddhist region in Europe. Buddhism there had been nearly eradicated under Soviet rule. During the anti-religious campaigns, every Buddhist temple in Kalmykia had been closed by 1938 and most of the clergy persecuted. The office of Šajin Lama, the head of Kalmykia's Buddhists, dated back to the 17th century. Its last holder, Lubsan Sharab Tepkin, was arrested in 1931, and the office was abolished. In December 1943, the Soviet authorities deported the Kalmyk population to Siberia. The deportation lasted until 1956, and the Kalmyk republic was not restored until 1958.

After the collapse of the Soviet Union, the Dalai Lama sent Telo Tulku Rinpoche, then 19, to lead a Buddhist revival among Kalmykia's 160,000 Kalmyks, according to The New York Times. In 1992, he was invited back to a specially convened Buddhist conference, where he was elected Šajin Lama of the Kalmyk people, restoring the office for the first time in six decades. He became president of the Buddhist Union of Kalmykia, the central body of the republic's Buddhists.

At the time of his first visit, Buddhist services were held in a private house outside Elista that held 30 to 40 people, or up to 50 on religious holidays. He later recalled that many Kalmyks had grown up in an atheist society and "believed that religion was poison", and said that leading them back to Buddhism had put him under great pressure. After so many years in a Tibetan monastery, he had also largely forgotten the Kalmyk language.

== Return to the United States ==
In 1993, Telo Tulku Rinpoche gave up his monastic vows and returned to the United States. Geshe Jampa Tinley later said that he had left for family reasons and asked Tinley to act as Šajin Lama, which Tinley did for about two years before handing the post back. He married in 1995. In the United States, he worked for a time as a telemarketer and a landscaper. Later in 1995, he met the Dalai Lama at Drepung Monastery in India. He later recalled that the Dalai Lama urged him to keep serving the people of Kalmykia even though he was no longer a monk, and he went back to the republic. In 2012, his family lived in Erie, Colorado, and he divided his time between Kalmykia and Colorado.

== Buddhist revival in Kalmykia ==
Back in Kalmykia, Telo Tulku Rinpoche led the rebuilding of the republic's Buddhist institutions. More than 30 Buddhist temples and prayer houses were built under his leadership, and by his own count more than 130 stupas were erected.

Building a new temple in central Elista had been the main promise of President Kirsan Ilyumzhinov's 1995 re-election campaign. At Ilyumzhinov's request, the Dalai Lama consecrated the site during his 2004 visit. Telo Tulku Rinpoche later said the temple had not first been planned on so large a scale, and that once Ilyumzhinov agreed to the bigger design, the president ordered preliminary architectural drawings that same day. The Golden Abode of Shakyamuni Buddha was built in about a year and opened in 2005. It became his residence, and it is the largest Buddhist temple complex in Russia and Europe. In August 2008, at his invitation, the Maitreya Project Heart Shrine Relic Tour, a travelling exhibition of Buddhist relics organised by Lama Zopa Rinpoche, was shown at the temple. The organisers reported more than 70,000 visitors.

Beginning in 1993, he sent about 100 Kalmyk students to India, most of them to monasteries and others to institutions including the Central Institute of Higher Tibetan Studies in Varanasi and the Tibetan Medical and Astrological Institute (Men-Tsee-Khang). In 2003, he told Forum 18 that about 11 Kalmyk novices were studying in southern India, and estimated that state funds had covered about 70 per cent of the cost of the new temples. According to the republic's religious affairs official, Ilyumzhinov had signed a decree awarding scholarships to eleven novices to be chosen by Telo Tulku Rinpoche. In November 2007, he was the driving force behind the first festival of Mongolian and Russian Buddhist culture in Dharamsala, India, held while about 400 Buddhists from Mongolia and Russia were there for teachings by the Dalai Lama. In 2007, a Buddhist centre in Mongolia asked him to supervise the revival of Naropanchen Monastery, which his previous incarnation had led. In 2012, he said that a shortage of clergy trained to head temples had held back Buddhism, particularly in rural Kalmykia.

In an interview with the geographer Edward Holland, he described Buddhism as "the spice of being Kalmykian" and said it had "become a symbol of the Kalmyk nation". The anthropologist Elza-Bair Guchinova regards a monastic community that strictly keeps its vows as the most important result of his three decades as Šajin Lama. She also credits him with bringing Buddhist teachers from abroad to lecture in Kalmykia and with organising regular pilgrimages.

Not all Kalmyk Buddhists welcomed his leadership. The anthropologist Valeria Gazizova, whose fieldwork took place in 2011 and 2012, writes that members of Vozrozhdenie ("Revival"), a new religious group in Kalmykia, saw him as detached from local people because he was an American citizen who spoke neither Kalmyk nor Russian fluently, and viewed the Central Khurul, staffed largely by Tibetan monks, in the same way. The group held several protests, including one outside the Central Khurul in September 2007, calling for the national features of Kalmyk Buddhism to be preserved.

== Dalai Lama's visits and teachings ==
During the Dalai Lama's first visit to Kalmykia in 1991, Telo Tulku Rinpoche arranged for him to meet Sanji Ulanov, an elderly Kalmyk monk who had spent nearly 25 years in Soviet labour camps. The Dalai Lama came back in September 1992. Russia refused him a visa in 2004. In June that year, an official People's Republic of China delegation from the Tibet Autonomous Region, led by the region's chairman, demanded that portraits of the Dalai Lama be removed from Kalmykia's main temple before they would enter. Telo Tulku Rinpoche refused, and the visit to the temple was cancelled.

That November, Russia granted the Dalai Lama a visa, over Chinese protests, for a brief visit to Elista. It was his first trip to Russia in more than twelve years. "Even if it is a short visit, it is very important for us," Telo Tulku Rinpoche told reporters. Russia's Foreign Ministry later stopped issuing the Dalai Lama visas after protests from China. In 2009, Telo Tulku Rinpoche and Jampel Lodoy, the head lama of Tuva, made a joint appeal to the Foreign Ministry to let him visit. He went with Kalmykia's leaders when they called on the Dalai Lama in Dharamsala. During Ilyumzhinov's visit in August 2003, he told reporters that efforts were being made to win President Vladimir Putin's help in obtaining a visa, and in November 2018 he accompanied Ilyumzhinov's successor, Aleksey Orlov, to an audience with the Dalai Lama.

Since 2009, the Dalai Lama has given annual teachings for Russian Buddhists in Dharamsala at the request of Telo Tulku Rinpoche and Yelo Rinpoche of Buryatia. More than 1,000 Russian Buddhists attended in 2010. When the Dalai Lama visited the Baltic states in 2012, he gave a separate audience to Russian Buddhists and afterwards asked his representatives to arrange teachings for them in a Baltic country. From 2014, teachings for Russian Buddhists were also held in Riga, Latvia. In 2020 and 2021, they took place online.

== Opposition to the war in Ukraine and resignation ==
Telo Tulku Rinpoche left Russia in the spring of 2022 and settled in Mongolia, where he helped people who had fled Russia. Kalmykia lies in southern Russia, a few hundred kilometres from Ukraine. In an interview with a Russian YouTube blogger published in October 2022, he became the first religious leader in Russia to condemn the Russian invasion of Ukraine in public. He called the war unnecessary and said that Ukraine was right to defend "its country, its land, its truth, its Constitution, its people". Speaking to Meduza in 2025, he said that the hardest part of the preceding months had been "to remain silent for a long time". Russia's mobilization, he said, convinced him the war would go on, and as a Buddhist he could no longer stay silent.

On 27 January 2023, Russia's Ministry of Justice added Telo Tulku Rinpoche to its register of foreign agents. The ministry stated that he had spoken against the "special military operation", openly supported Ukraine, was a United States citizen and lived outside Russia. The next day, in a statement published by the Central Khurul, he announced that he was stepping down as Šajin Lama. He handed his duties to the khurul's abbot, Geshe Tenzin Choidak (Mutul Ovyanov), and its administrator, Yonten Lodoi (Sergei Kirishov), and asked the monastic community to choose a successor from among fully ordained monks. He said that his role as the Dalai Lama's representative was unaffected.

In 2022, the Buddhologist Andrey Terentyev had told Nezavisimaya Gazeta that, unless the state stepped in, he did not expect anyone in Kalmykia to want to replace him, as no one there had comparable spiritual authority. The monastic community elected Tenzin Choidak as Šajin Lama, and the Dalai Lama confirmed him on 15 February 2023. Buddhistdoor Global describes Telo Tulku Rinpoche's tenure, from 1992 to 2023, as the longest since the office was established in 1639.

== Representative of the Dalai Lama ==
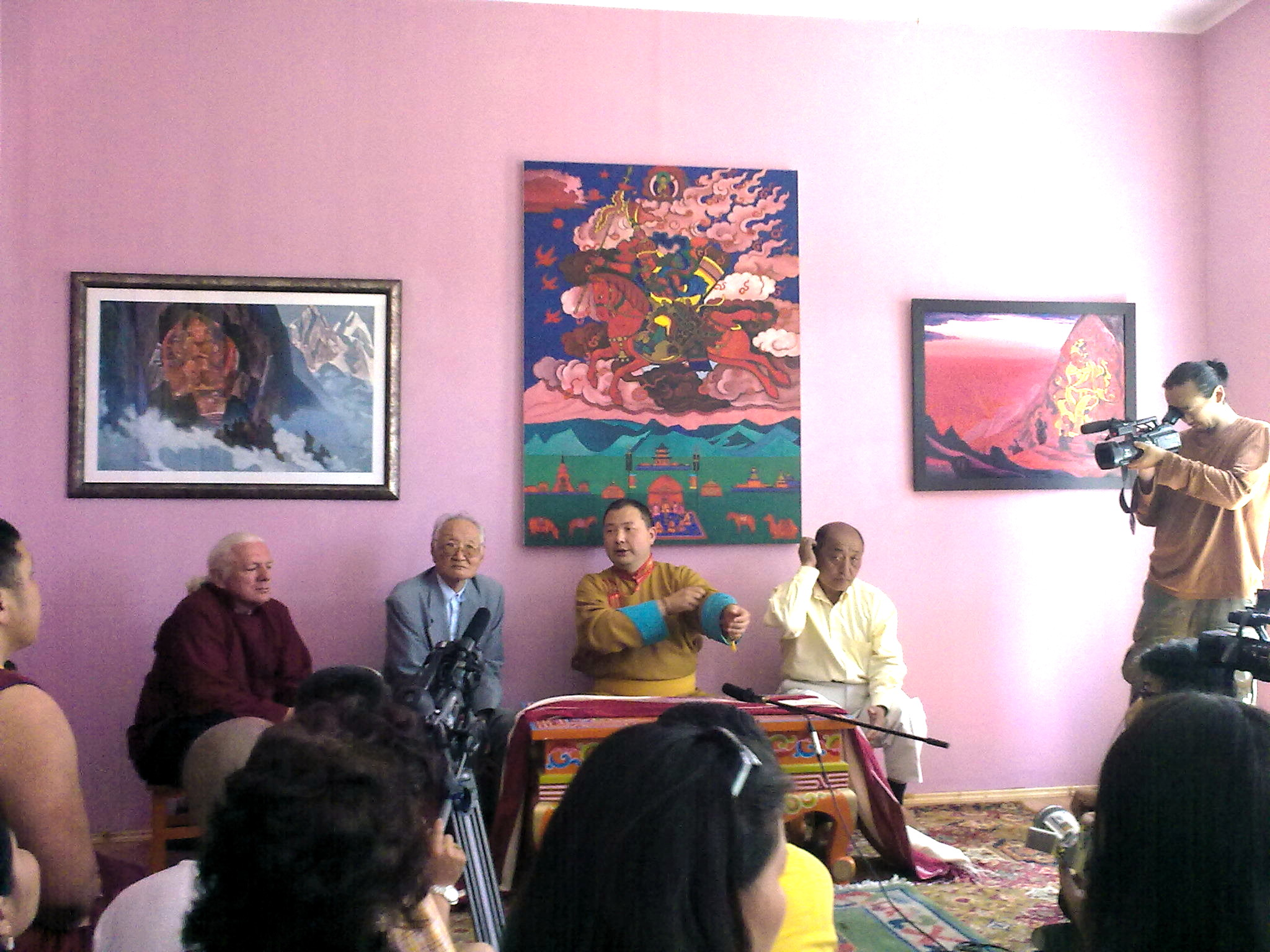
Telo Tulku Rinpoche visiting the Roerich House in Ulaanbaatar, with Glenn H. Mullin

In October 2014, Telo Tulku Rinpoche was appointed honorary representative of the Dalai Lama and the Central Tibetan Administration to Russia, Mongolia and the other countries of the Commonwealth of Independent States. The post is based at the Tibet Culture and Information Centre (Office of Tibet) in Moscow, and he took office in February 2015. He was reappointed in 2021. In December 2016, at the celebrations in Mundgod for the 600th anniversary of the founding of Drepung Monastery, of which Drepung Gomang is a college, he read out letters of congratulation to the monastery. In November 2017, speaking as the Dalai Lama's representative at the Supreme World Wide Buddhist Conference in Sri Lanka, he urged Buddhists not to forget those "who continue to suffer under communism" in Tibet. Tibetan Review wrote that he was reported to have carried on after the session chair reminded speakers not to discuss politics.

=== Dialogues with Russian scientists ===
His office in Moscow, together with the Save Tibet Foundation and with support from the Center for Consciousness Studies at Moscow State University, organized a series of dialogues between the Dalai Lama, Buddhist scholars and Russian scientists. The first, on "The Nature of Consciousness", was held in New Delhi on 5–8 August 2017 and was coordinated by Telo Tulku Rinpoche. He noted afterwards that dialogues between Western scientists and Buddhist scholars had been held for more than 30 years, but that this was the first to involve Russian scientists. A second dialogue, on "Understanding the World", followed in Dharamsala in May 2018.

The dialogues led to a study of thukdam, a state in which, according to Tibetan tradition, an accomplished meditator remains in meditation after clinical death. Telo Tulku Rinpoche was the project's coordinator; by May 2021, Russian neuroscientists led by Svyatoslav Medvedev of the Institute of the Human Brain in Saint Petersburg, working with Tibetan monks trained in Russia, had examined 104 monks.

=== Work in Mongolia ===
He was also active in Mongolia, the homeland of his previous incarnation. In June 2019, he introduced SEE Learning, a school ethics programme backed by the Dalai Lama, to Mongolia's education minister, and in July 2021 Kalmykia's education minister agreed to adopt it in the republic's schools. The Diluv Khutagt Foundation, which he chairs, had four documentary films about the Dalai Lama translated into Mongolian and broadcast on national television during the COVID-19 pandemic, and published a Mongolian edition of the Dalai Lama's book Beyond Religion. In April 2024, at a conference on relations between Tibet and Mongolia organized by the foundation with the Tibet Policy Institute and the Office of Tibet in Moscow, he called Mongolia "Tibet's oldest friend and ally".

=== End of term ===
After his designation as a foreign agent, he carried out the role from Mongolia. In March 2025, a member of the Tibetan Parliament-in-Exile argued that he should step down if he could not do the job in person. The Central Tibetan Administration's information minister, Norzin Dolma, replied that he could not return to Russia, and that his term had been extended by one year while a successor was sought. Phayul reported that a successor was hard to find because there are few Tibetans in Russia and the neighbouring countries. On 11 May 2026, he announced that his tenure had ended after two terms, and said that he would continue to support the Tibetan cause. According to Phayul, he was the only non-Tibetan to have held the post. He is president of the Kalmyk Buddhist Culture Organization.

== Music ==
Telo Tulku Rinpoche sang the vocal part of Bodhicharyāvatāra (2009), a 60-minute work by the Russian composer Anton Batagov based on chapters 1, 3, 6 and 10 of Shantideva's Bodhicaryāvatāra. According to Batagov, the two met in 2008, when Telo Tulku Rinpoche suggested that he record the chapters in a studio and that Batagov compose music around the vocal track. The album was recorded between December 2008 and February 2009 and released on CD by the Tummo label. A remastered digital edition followed in 2022 on Supertrain Records. Its setting of the third chapter, "Adopting the Spirit of Awakening", was broadcast on WNYC's New Sounds in 2018.

He also started large public musical offerings in Elista. At a 2015 celebration of the Dalai Lama's 80th birthday, about 330 young people played the dombra, and in 2019 more than 700 Kalmyk musicians and singers took part. He described the 2019 offering as a way to honor the older generation who had kept the Kalmyk language and culture alive.

== See also ==
- Buddhism in Russia
- Buddhism in Mongolia
- Kalmyk people
- Western tulku
