= Tilopa =

Indian philosopher

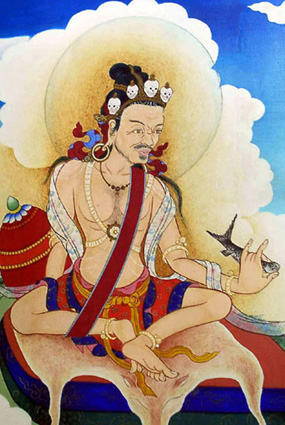
Tilopa.

Tilopa (Prakrit; Sanskrit: Talika or Tilopadā) was a Buddhist tantric mahasiddha who lived in northeast India around the 10th century -- perhaps from 988 to 1069 though from 928 to 1009 is also suggested. The information of his life comes from spiritual biographies or hagiographies where actual biographical details are few and the texts concentrate on spiritual growth of an individual. The earliest of these hagiographies was composed during the 11th century.

Tilopa practised the Cakrasaṃvara Tantra, a set of spiritual practices intended to accelerate the process of attaining Buddhahood. He became a holder of all the tantric lineages, possibly the only person in his day to do so. In addition to the way of insight and Mahamudra, Tilopa learned and passed on the Way of Methods (today known as the Six Yogas of Naropa) and guru yoga. Naropa is considered his main student, though his hagiographies mention by name two other disciples as well.

== Life ==
The historical documentation of Tilopa's life doesn't exist or is not known. The first biography or hagiography of Tilopa was written in the 11th century, and another major biography was written during the 14th century; however, others followed in e.g. 16th century. The account below is a synopsis of biography in Chos-Kyi Blo-Gros The Life of the Mahasiddha Tilopa. The one thing most accounts agree is that he was born in northeast India into the Brahmin caste, i.e. in what nowadays is Bangladesh or Eastern India. After his birth a soothsayer profesied to his mother that he'd be either a buddha, deva, nāga or yaksha. Later his mother had a vision of several ugly women, telling Tilopa's her to make him a buffalo herder and also learn scriptures -- the latter might mean taking monastic vows instead of just learning to meditate. His mother adhered to advice given, and having grown up, Tilopa encountered the same women in another vision while herding buffaloes -- this time they revealed Tilopa's spiritual pedigree and exhorted the boy to go to a cemetery of Salavihara or Salabheraha.

In the cemetery Tilopa encountered a teacher called Cāryapa, and a teacher called Lawapa or Kambalapā who both gave him spiritual instructions. In the cemetery he was taught by an ascetic named Mātangīpa too.

Later he encounted a ḍākinī named Subhagini or Matongha in the temple where his uncle was an abbot and taught. Subhagini asked whether or not he understood the text of Satasāhasrikā. Having received a negative answer she further explicated the text to him, and told him to meditate. However, Tilopa's uncle had forbidden him from meditating. So, the ḍākinī then urged him to fasten the text Satasāhasrikā with a rope, toss it out of the temple door in water, and act like a madman. The act didn't go unnoticed: Though the text did not suffer damage, he was remonstrated and beaten. Some time after that, Subhagini told him go East to the market place of Pañcapana, find a prostitute called Bharima or Dharima, and follow her as a servant.

Tilopa did what Subhagini told him to do, went to Pañcapana, found Brahima, and worked as a pimp for her at nights while also working as a sesame seed trasher during the day. Later, while trashing sesame seeds, he attained the perfection close to the great seal or mahamudra. At the same time people around the city had flaming visions of him or visions of his bone ornaments blazing; the people came and asked him to teach them, and the king of the country too came to pay his respects.

From several teachers Tilopa received teachings:

- From Nagarjuna he learned the of illusory body, and perhaps transmission the radiant light (Sanskrit: prabashvara) and illusory body (Sanskrit: maya deha, Tib. gyulu) teachings (Cakrasaṃvara Tantra), Lagusamvara tantra, or Heruka Abhidharma.
- From Caryāpa he received the transmission of dreams.
- From Lawapa he learned the transmission of clear light and possibly the dream yoga.
- From either Jñānaḍākinī or Saryapa he learned the transmission of inner heat.

From Vajradhara -- by direct transmission -- instructions or the entirety of mahamudra.

- From Sukhasiddhi Tilopa received the teachings on life, death, and the bardo (states between lives and consciousness transference/phowa).
- From Indrabhuti he gained wisdom (prajña).
- And, from Matangi he learned the resurrection of the dead body.

== Teachings ==
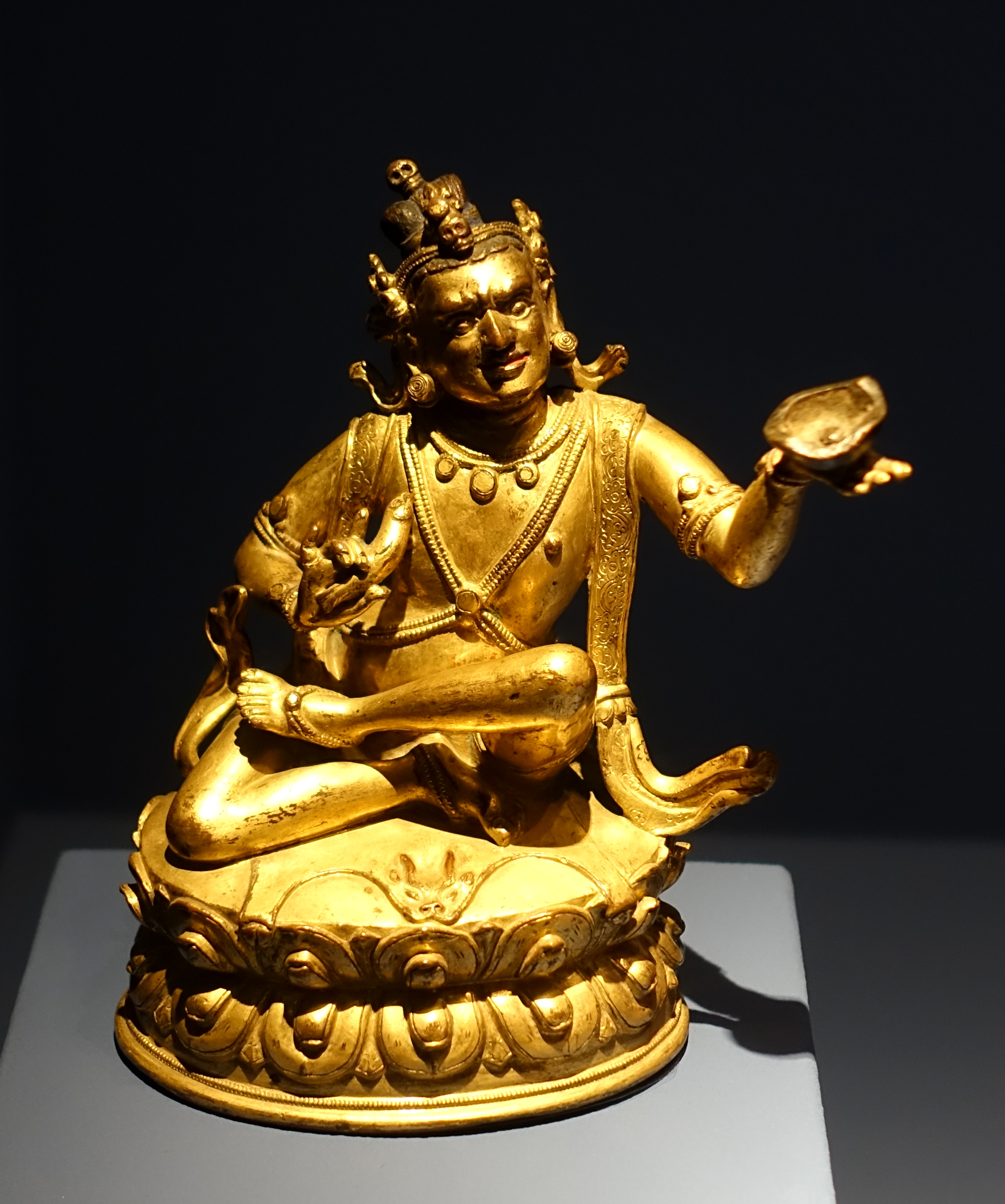
Mahasiddha Tilopa, southern Tibet, 16th-17th century AD, bronze - Linden-Museum - Stuttgart, Germany.

=== Six Precepts or Words of Advice ===
Tilopa gave Naropa a teaching called the Six Words of Advice. The original text does not survive, but a Tibetan translation has been preserved.

In Tibetan, the teaching is called gnad kyi gzer drug – literally, "six nails of key points"; the aptness of the title becomes clear if one considers the meaning of the English idiomatic expression, "to hit the nail on the head."

The six precepts have been translated in several rather different ways. Three are presented below.

==== McLeod translation ====
Ken McLeod's translation together with original Tibetan:

Six Words of Advice
	Literal translation	Explanatory translation	Original Tibetan	Tibetan (Wylie transliteration)
1	Don't recall	Let go of what has passed	མི་མནོ་	mi mno
2	Don't imagine	Let go of what may come	མི་བསམ	mi bsam
3	Don't think	Let go of what is happening now	མི་སེམས	mi sems
4	Don't examine	Don't try to figure anything out	མི་དཔྱོད་	mi dpyod
5	Don't control	Don't try to make anything happen	མི་སྒོམ་	mi sgom
6	Rest	Relax, right now, and rest	རང་སར་བཞག་	rang sar bzhag

==== Khenpo Konchog Gyaltsen Rinpoche translation ====
Another translation by Khenpo Konchog Gyaltsen Rinpoche renders the original Tibetan in English as

Do not ponder, think, or cognize.
Do not meditate or examine.
Leave the mind to itself.

==== Watts-Wayman translation ====
An earlier translation circa 1957 by Alan Watts and Dr. Alex Wayman rendered Tilopa's "Six Precepts" as

No thought, no reflection, no analysis,
No cultivation, no intention;
Let it settle itself.

In a footnote, Watts cited a Tibetan source text at partial variance with McLeod's in sequence and syntax, namely:

Mi-mno, mi-bsam, mi-dpyad-ching,
Mi-bsgom, mi-sems, rang-babs-bzhag.

Based on an "elucidation" provided by Wayman, Watts explained that

Mi-mno is approximately equivalent to the Zen terms wu-hsin (無心) or wu-nien (無念), "no-mind" or "no thought." Bsam is the equivalent of the Sanskrit cintana, i.e., discursive thinking about what has been heard, and dpyad of mimamsa, or "philosophical analysis." Bsgom is probably bhavana or the Chinese hsiu (修), "to cultivate," "to practice," or "intense concentration." Sems is cetana or szu (思), with the sense of intention or volition. Rang-babs-bzhag is literally "self-settle-establish," and "self-settle" would seem to be an almost exact equivalent of the Taoist tzu-jan (自然, pinyin: zì rán), "self-so", "spontaneous", or "natural".

=== Mahamudra instructions ===
Tilopa also gave mahamudra instruction to Naropa by means of the song known as "The Ganges Mahamudra," one stanza of which reads:

The fool in his ignorance, disdaining Mahamudra,
Knows nothing but struggle in the flood of samsara.
Have compassion for those who suffer constant anxiety!
Sick of unrelenting pain and desiring release, adhere to a Guru,
For when his blessing touches your heart, the mind is liberated.

=== Attachment and enjoyment ===
Tilopa also gave instructions concerning pleasure: "The problem is not enjoyment; the problem is attachment."

== Later incarnations ==
A line of reincarnate lamas (tulkus) in Mongolian Buddhism is traced back to Tilopa. Its holders bear the title Diluwa Khutugtu (also spelled Dilowa Khutagt), Diluwa being the Mongolian form of Tilopa's name; the Tibetan form is Telo. The eleventh holder of the title, Diluwa Khutugtu Jamsrangjab, left Mongolia and spent his final years in the United States. While a young student at Drepung Gomang Monastery in India, the Kalmyk-American lama Telo Tulku Rinpoche was recognized by the 14th Dalai Lama as Jamsrangjab's reincarnation and the current holder of the title.

== Bibliography ==
- Rinpoche, Chökyi Nyima; Nyima, Rinpoche Chokyi (1994). Union of Mahamudra and Dzogchen. Rangjung Yeshe Publications. ISBN 978-962-7341-21-5.
- Rinpoche, Sangyes Nyenpa (2014). Tilopa's Mahamudra Upadesha: The Gangama Instructions with Commentary. Shambhala Publications. ISBN 978-0-8348-2974-9.

Preceded by Dorje Chang	Kagyu school	Succeeded by Naropa
