= Mongolian studies =

Area field of Mongolian culture

Mongolian studies or Mongolistics is an interdisciplinary field of scholarly inquiry concerning Mongolian language, Mongolian history, and Mongolian culture. Scholars who work in the field of Mongolian studies are often referred to as Mongolists.

== History ==
Isaac Jacob Schmidt is generally regarded as the "founder" of Mongolian studies as an academic discipline. Schmidt, a native of Amsterdam who emigrated to Russia on account of the French invasion, began his exposure to the Mongolic languages as a missionary of the Moravian Church among the Kalmyks, and translated the Gospel of Matthew into the Kalmyk language. Afterwards he moved to Moscow and then Saint Petersburg, where he produced his most famous work: the first translation of the Erdeniin Tobchi into a European language. He also compiled a dictionary of Mongolian and a translation of the seven then-known chapters of the Epic of King Gesar. Other major figures in the early history of Mongolian studies in Russia were Józef Kowalewski of Poland (who founded the Mongolian studies department at Kazan University) and Matthias Castrén of Finland (who wrote the first grammar of a modern Mongolic language, published after his death by Franz Anton Schiefner at Saint Petersburg University).

China had far longer direct contact with Mongolic peoples than Russia or other European countries had, and thus a longer history of studying their languages. However, the modern academic tradition of Mongolian studies in China faced a variety of early setbacks. 19th-century studies of Mongolia by Chinese scholars were closely tied to Qing dynasty rule over Mongolia. The threat from Russian imperialism was a major spur for Chinese scholars to study the region, both as part of the project of "map[ping] and classify[ing] the frontier", and from their desire to emphasise affinity between the Han Chinese and peoples of the frontier and their common contrast with Japanese and European powers who sought influence in the region. Thus, as Stephen Kotkin describes it, in the aftermath of the 1911 Xinhai Revolution which overthrew the Qing and established the Republic of China, the whole field of study was seen as "closely tied to the Manchus and imperial rule" and became discredited, a state of affairs made worse by the opposition to the 1911 revolution of major Chinese scholars of Mongolia such as Wang Guowei. The development of Mongolian studies in China in the early years after the establishment of the People's Republic of China drew heavily on Russian works. One of the first tertiary-level centres for Mongolian studies in China, the Institute of Mongolia at Inner Mongolia University, was founded in 1964.

Some scholars in the United States did work in Mongolian studies in the early 20th century, such as Jeremiah Curtin, Berthold Laufer, and Roy Chapman Andrews. The University of California, Berkeley offered the U.S.' first course in the Mongolian language in 1936, taught by Ferdinand Lessing. Harvard University also had some scholars who worked in the field, such as Francis Woodman Cleaves and Antoine Mostaert; Joseph Fletcher was one of Cleaves' students. However, U.S. institutions for Mongolian studies were not founded until after World War II. Such institutions received a major boost from the post-war influx of refugees from communism, which included Diluwa Khutugtu Jamsrangjab, John Gombojab Hangin of Inner Mongolia and former Soviet Academy of Sciences member Nicholas Poppe. Poppe taught at the Far Eastern and Russian Institute at University of Washington; John Krueger was one of his students there. Denis Sinor of Hungary, who taught at the University of Cambridge after the war, arrived in the U.S. in 1962 and founded the Department of Ural and Altaic Studies at Indiana University (now known as the Department of Central Eurasian Studies), and later recruited Krueger and Hangin to join the department.

== See also ==
- American Center for Mongolian Studies
- Area studies
  - East Asian studies
