= Japan–Mongolia relations =

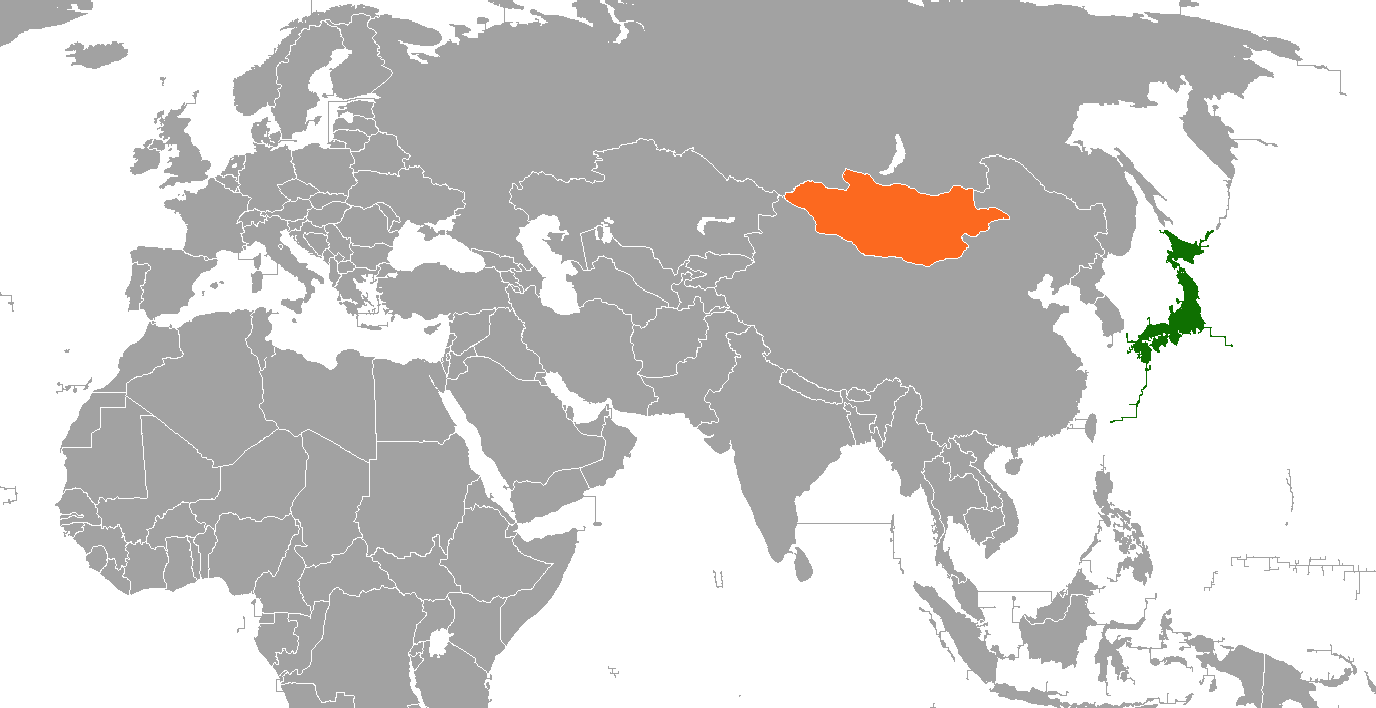

- Japan: Mongolia

Diplomatic mission
- Japanese embassy, Ulaanbaatar: Mongolian embassy, Tokyo

Japan–Mongolia relations (Japanese: 日本とモンゴルの関係; Mongolian: Япон-Монголын харилцаа) are the bilateral relations between Japan and Mongolia. The two countries established formal diplomatic relations in 1972. Since Mongolia's democratic alignment in the 1990s, Japan has been seen as one of its third neighbours, with the two countries signing a "Special Strategic Partnership for Peace and Prosperity" in 2022.

== History ==
Relations between the two peoples originally began in the 13th century between the Kamakura shogunate and the Mongol Empire, when the latter tried to conquer the former but failed.

=== Mongol invasions ===
By 1259, Korean resistance to the Mongol invasion had collapsed. With Korea under Mongol control, the attempts by the Mongol Empire to invade the Japanese archipelago began after the Goryeo Dynasty (now Korea) formed an alliance with Kublai Khan of the Mongols.

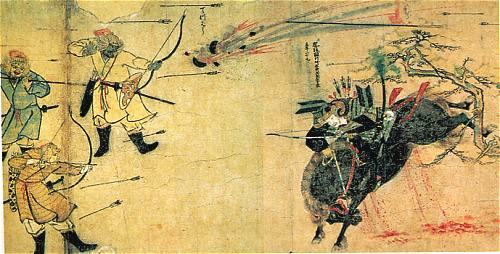
Takezaki Suenaga facing Mongol arrows and bombs containing gunpowder, circa 1293.

Kublai sent several emissaries, in 1268, demanding that the "king" of Japan submit to the Empire, under its mandate from Eternal Heaven. These emissaries were either ignored or rebuffed by Japan, and as a consequence in October 1274 Kublai sent an invasion fleet across Tsushima Strait to Tsushima Island, comprising over 900 ships and 20,000 soldiers. This, the first invasion, overran Tsushima and Iki. From there they sailed to Hakata Bay, which resulted in the Battle of Bun'ei, where what the Japanese were later to call a kamikaze ("divine wind") wrecked the invading forces in their ships.

The second attempted invasion came after more envoys had been sent in 1275 and 1279. At that time, the Japanese beheaded them rather than simply refusing them. As a consequence, Kublai dispatched another invasion fleet, consisting the Song fleet, which the Empire captured in 1275, and a further 1,000 ships supplied by Goryeo. The latter arrived in Japan in May 1281 before the Song fleet, and attacked Hakata without waiting for the Song ships, and also without success. Thus began the Battle of Kōan. The Song fleet arrived later, and also attacked Hakata, but were unable to overcome Japanese forces. Eventually, on the 15th of August, another kamikaze wrecked the invading forces in their ships.

=== 20th century ===
==== Early relations (1911–1931) ====
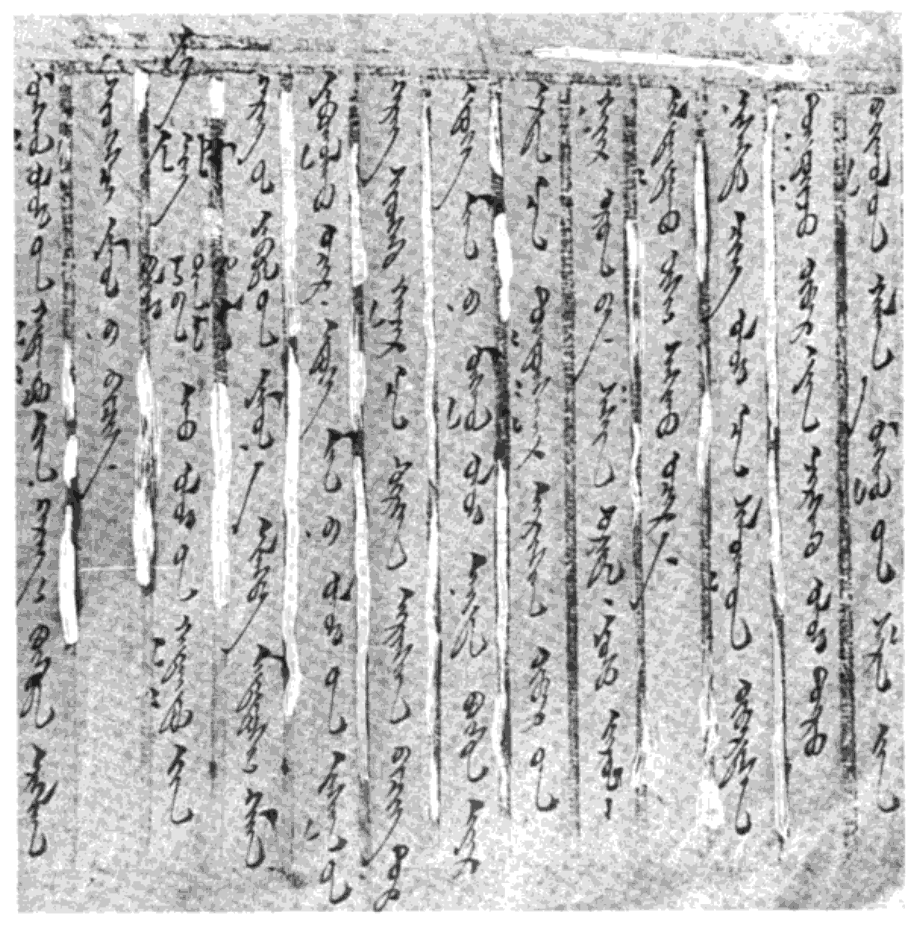
Letter proclaiming independence sent to the foreign ministries of France, England, Germany, the United States, Belgium, Japan, Denmark, Holland, and Austria

In 1911 Mongolia declared independence from the collapsing Qing Dynasty that had ruled it for almost three centuries. The new Mongolian government of Bogd Khan sent letters of independence to a number of consulates including that of Japan, and sent emissaries requesting formal diplomatic recognition to various world powers, including the Internal Affairs Minister, Da Lam Tserenchimed, who was sent to Japan in 1913.

==== World War II period (1931–1945) ====
In 1931, the Empire of Japan invaded Manchuria following the Mukden incident, and turned its interests to Soviet and aligned territories in the vicinity. To the east and south of Mongolia, Japan set up Manchukou and Mengjiang as puppet states, the latter being nominally led by the Inner Mongolian prince Demchugdongrub. In 1939, Japanese and allied forces clashed with Soviet and Mongolian forces near the Khalkhin Gol river, with the latter victorious and the borders unchanged. This and other engagements in the Soviet–Japanese border conflicts eventually led to the signing of the Soviet–Japanese Neutrality Pact in 1941.

In 1945, the Soviet Union and Mongolia declared war on Japan, and invaded the Japanese-occupied territories of Manchuria and Inner Mongolia, which afterwards returned to Chinese rule.

==== Post World War II ====
After World War II, diplomatic relations between Japan and Mongolia only resumed on 24 February 1972. This was done following the invitation and attendance of Mongolia to the Expo '70, held in Osaka, which revealed a strong desire to normalise relations on both sides. Following this, the Central Committee of the Mongolian People's Revolutionary Party voted against raising the issue of war reparations with Japan, thus leading to an exchange of diplomats and restoring of formal relations. On 17 March 1977, the two nations signed an agreement on economic co-operation. This agreement gave Mongolia an investment of ¥5,000,000,000 into cashmere production. By 1988, trade between Mongolia and Japan was worth US$30 million, equivalent to 43% of all Mongolian trade with capitalist nations.

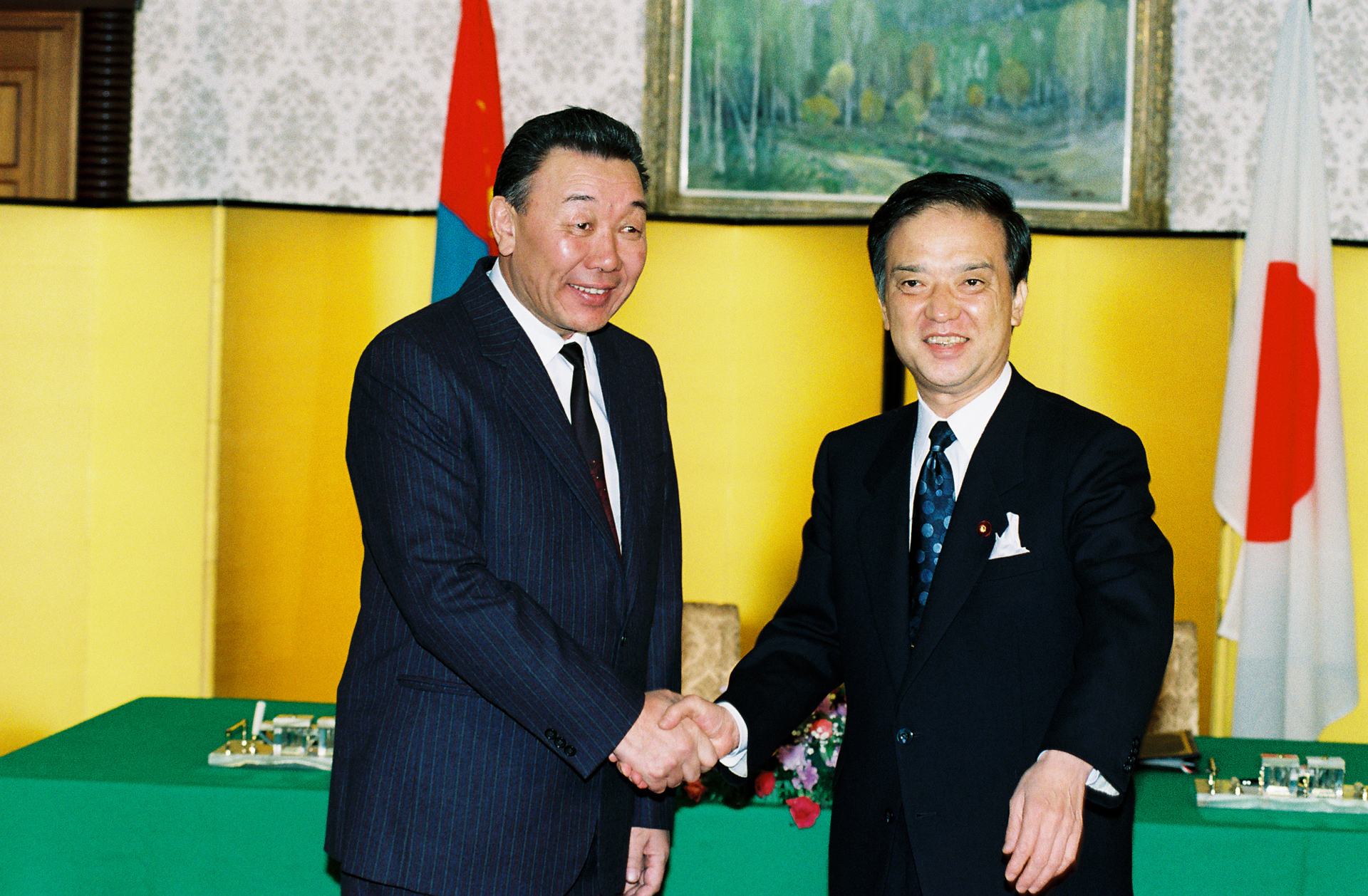
Prime minister Dumaagiin Sodnom shaking hands with prime minister Toshiki Kaifu during state visit to Japan in March 1990.

Relations improved following 1990 Democratic Revolution in Mongolia, whereupon Sousuke Uno's visit in April 1989 and Toshiki Kaifu's visit to Mongolia in August 1991, following the visit by Dumaagiin Sodnom to Japan in March 1990, became the first visits to Mongolia by a non-Eastern Bloc minister and prime minister, respectively.

=== 21st century ===
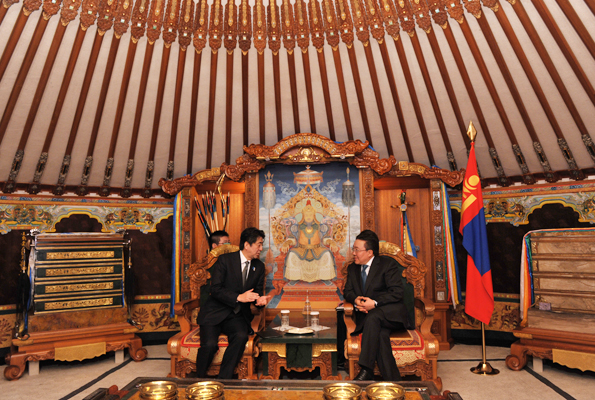
Prime minister Shinzo Abe with president Tsakhiagiin Elbegdorj during his first state visit to Ulaanbaatar, Mongolia, 30 March 2013; Abe visited the country on three separate occasions.

In 2008, the Japan Bank for International Cooperation financed a ¥28.8 billion (US$385 million) loan for the government of Mongolia to build a new international airport for Ulaanbaatar to replace Buyant-Ukhaa International Airport. The new Chinggis Khaan International Airport and opened on 4 July 2021.

On 31 January 2025, it was announced that Emperor Naruhito and Empress Masako of Japan would pay a state visit to Mongolia in early July at the invitation of President Ukhnaagiin Khürelsükh. The visit, held from 6-13 July 2025, marked the first official visit to Mongolia by a reigning Japanese imperial couple.

== High-level visits ==
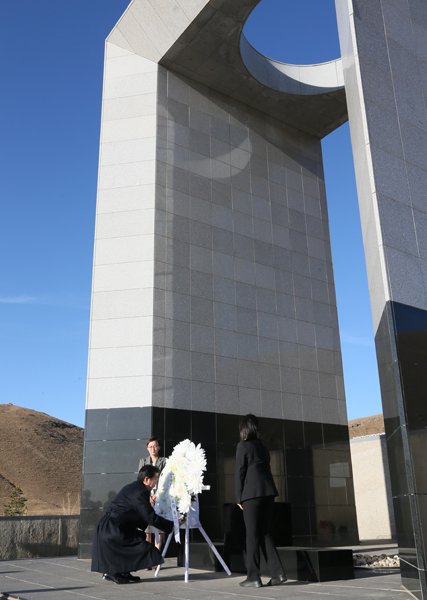
Prime minister Shinzo Abe offering flowers at the Memorial for Japanese Prisoners of War, 22 October 2015

=== From Japanese leaders to Mongolia ===
- Prime Minister Sōsuke Uno (April 1989)
- Prime Minister Toshiki Kaifu (August 1991)
- Prime Minister Keizō Obuchi (July 1999)
- Prince Akishino (June 2002)
- Prime Minister Junichiro Koizumi (August 2006)
- Crown Prince Naruhito (July 2007)
- Prime Minister Shinzo Abe (30–31 March 2013)
- Prime Minister Shinzo Abe (22 October 2015)
- Prime Minister Shinzo Abe (14-16 July 2016)
- Emperor Naruhito and Empress Masako (6–13 July 2025)

=== From Mongolian leaders to Japan ===
- Prime Minister Dumaagiin Sodnom (March 1990)

== Opinion polls ==
According to a 2019 survey by the Ministry of Foreign Affairs of Japan, almost 40% of Mongolians regard Japan as an important foreign partner in the future, lesser than opinion on Russia and twice more than China.

== Culture ==
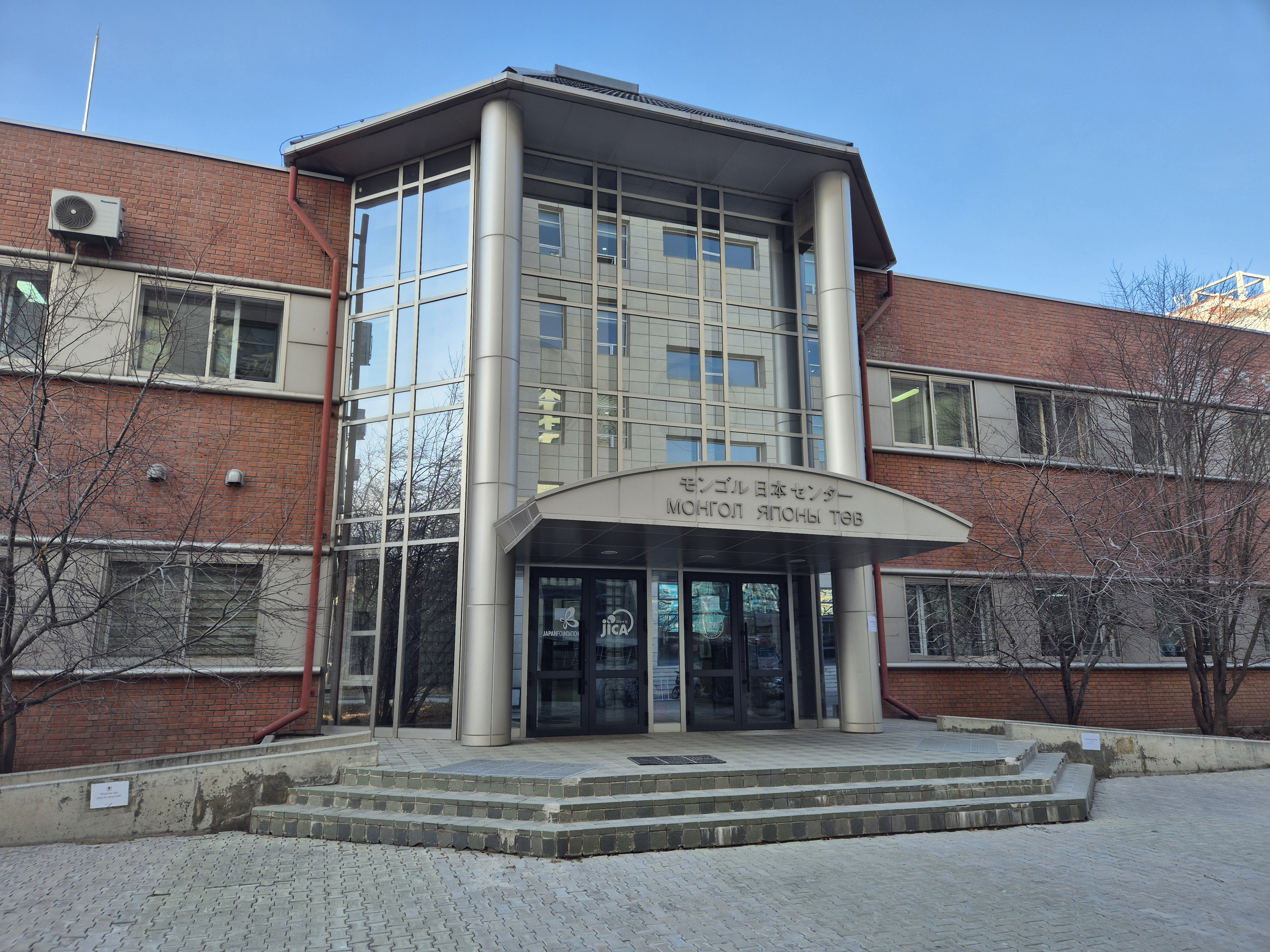
Mongolia–Japan Center at the National University of Mongolia, Ulaanbaatar

Japanese culture has seen a rise in popularity among the young Mongolian population. Besides Japanese being one of the most commonly studied foreign languages in Mongolia, cultural exports from Japan such as anime, music and food have made an impact on modern Mongolian society.

== People ==
Japan hosts one of the largest Mongolian diaspora communities, totalling 21,186 as of June 2025.

Mongolian wrestlers have been successful in Japanese sumo wrestling.

== Diplomatic missions ==
The two countries maintain embassies in Ulaanbaatar and Tokyo.

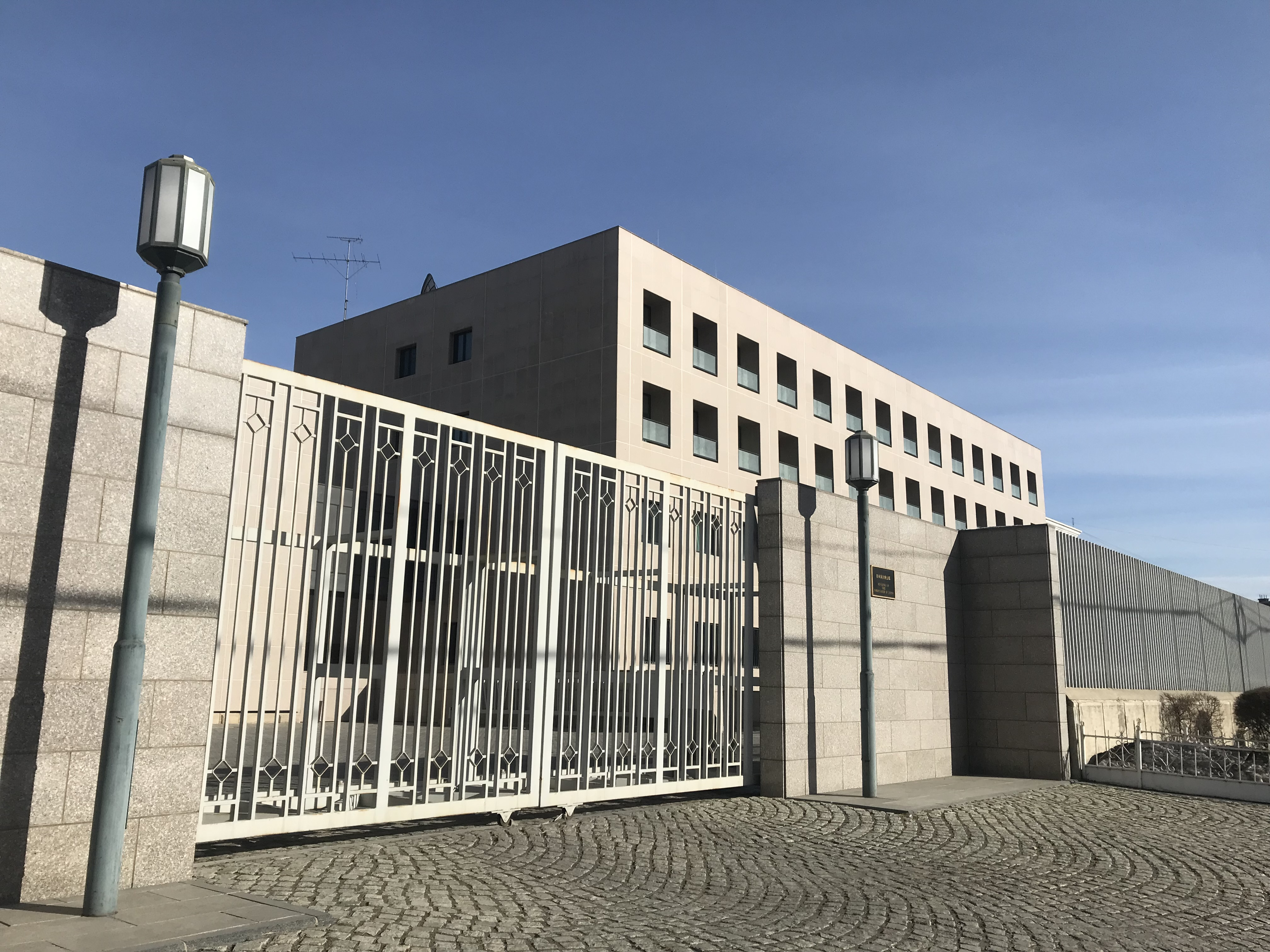
Embassy of Japan, Ulaanbaatar

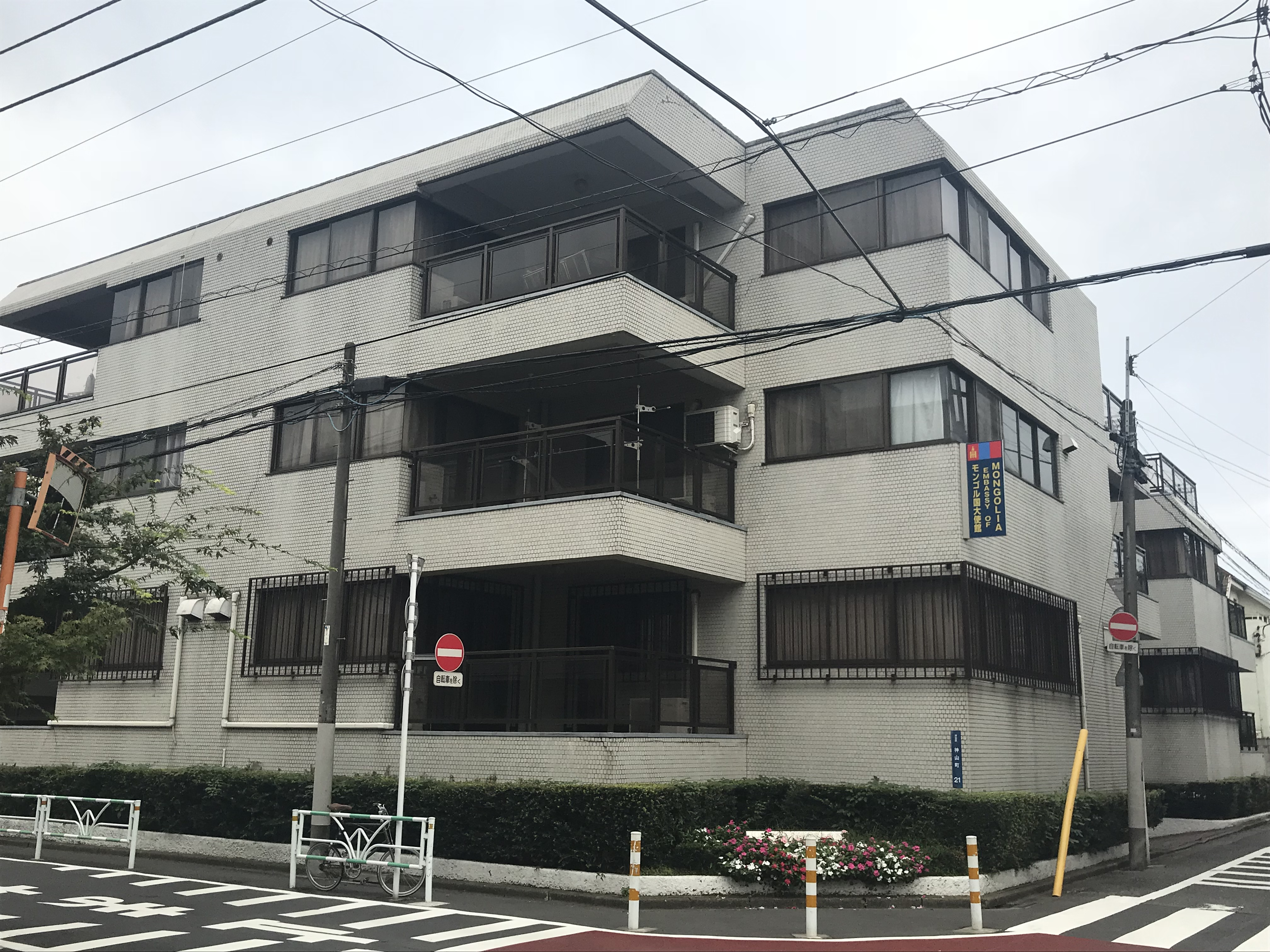
Embassy of Mongolia, Tokyo

== See also ==
- Mongolians in Japan
- Japanese language education in Mongolia
- Mongolia in World War II
- Mongol invasions of Japan
