= Urgunge Onon =

Urgunge Onon (Mongolian: ᠥᠷᠭᠦᠩᠭᠡᠨ
ᠣᠨᠣᠨ, Өргөнгөө Онон, romanized: Örgöngge Onon January 1, 1920 – December 2015, also known as Peter Onon) was a Daur Mongol historian and Mongolist. He was a founding member of the Mongolian studies program at the University of Leeds and co-founder of the Mongolia and Inner Asia Studies Unit (MIASU) at the University of Cambridge.

== Biography ==
Urgunge was born in 1920 in a village in North-Eastern Inner Mongolia, close to the border with Manchuria. A member of the Onon clan of Daur Mongols, growing up he was interested in shamanistic beliefs and rituals still surviving amongst his people. Amidst the growing instability in the area due to the Japanese invasion of Manchuria, his family were able to send him to a Japanese boarding school near Qiqihar, eventually becoming proficient in Japanese and being selected for university in Japan. He moved to Tokyo in 1941 to study political science at Toyo University, graduating in 1944. In Tokyo Urgunge became fascinated with the West, having had access to foreign films and newsreels for the first time.

Upon his return to Inner Mongolia he moved to Sonid Right Banner and worked for the Mongol Prince Demchugdongrub as a teacher and bodyguard. With the communist forces advancing he joined the Chinese local government and later became an Inner Mongolian delegate to the Nationalist government in Nanking. In Nanking he made contact with Owen Lattimore, who was to be a major influence in his life, and with his help obtained a one-year fellowship at Johns Hopkins University. Upon moving to the United States in November 1948 he was one of just a few Mongolian scholars resident there, including John Gombojab Hangin and Diluwa Khutugtu Jamsrangjab. Working for multiple agencies and organizations, due to the rise of McCarthyism and charges against Lattimore, Urgunge and others connected to Lattimore eventually lost their jobs.

In 1963 Lattimore was recruited by the University of Leeds to establish a Department of Chinese Studies (now East Asian Studies), and insisted on bringing Urgunge as a lecturer. In 1966 Urgunge first visited Mongolia and formed working relationships with senior academicians Shirendev, Damdinsuren, Natsagdorj as well as then-leader Yumjaagiin Tsedenbal, helping to nurture academic, business, and diplomatic ties between Mongolia and the UK. In 1968, together with Lattimore, they established a Mongolian Studies Programme at Leeds.

Urgunge retired from Leeds in 1985, but maintained his academic interests. In 1986, Urgunge and Caroline Humphrey jointly founded the Mongolia and Inner Asia Studies Unit (MIASU) at the University of Cambridge, where he became general manager, as well as life member at Clare Hall, Cambridge. In addition, he was awarded the title of Honorary Professor at the National University of Mongolia, and served as a Visiting Professor at the Tokyo University of Foreign Studies.

He was the first Mongolian to translate the Secret History of the Mongols into English in 1990 (republished in 2001).

== Personal life ==
Urgunge was married to Narangerel and had four children: Solongowa, Oyongowa, Temujin, and Toli.

== Bibliography ==
- Onon, Urgunge (1972). My Childhood in Mongolia. Oxford University Press. ISBN 978-0-19-917022-7.
- Brown, William A.; Onon, Urgunge (1976). History of the Mongolian People's Republic. Vol. 65 (1 ed.). Harvard University Asia Center. ISBN 978-0-674-39862-7. JSTOR j.ctt1tfjbm2.
- Onon, Urgunge (1976). Mongolian Heroes of the Twentieth Century. AMS Press. ISBN 978-0-404-15402-8.
- Sanjdorj, M.; Sanzhdorzh, Magsarzhavyn (1980). Manchu Chinese Colonial Rule in Northern Mongolia. C. Hurst & Company. ISBN 978-0-905838-24-3.
- Onon, Urgungge; Pritchatt, Derrick (1989). Asia's First Modern Revolution: Mongolia Proclaims Its Independence in 1911. BRILL. ISBN 978-90-04-08390-5.
- Onon, Urgunge (1990). The History and the Life of Chinggis Khan: The Secret History of the Mongols. Brill Archive. ISBN 978-90-04-09236-5.
- Bradbury, Sue (1993). Chinggis Khan: The Golden History of the Mongols. Folio Society.
- Humphrey, Caroline; Onon, Urgunge (1996). Shamans and Elders: Experience, Knowledge and Power Among the Daur Mongols. Clarendon Press. ISBN 978-0-19-828068-2.
- Lattimore, Owen; Nachukdorji, Sh (1955). Nationalism and Revolution in Mongolia. Brill Archive.
- Onon, Professor Urgunge; Onon, Urgunge (2005-08-18). The Secret History of the Mongols: The Life and Times of Chinggis Khan. Routledge. ISBN 978-1-135-79556-6.
- Austin, William Mandeville; Hangin, John G.; Onon, Peter M. (1997). Mongol Reader. Curzon. ISBN 978-0-7007-0380-7.
