= John Gombojab Hangin =

American linguist

- Born: May 10, 1921; Taibus Banner, Chahar Province, Republic of China
- Died: October 9, 1989 (aged 68); Ulaanbaatar, Mongolian People's Republic
- Education: Johns Hopkins University; University of California, Berkeley; Columbia University; Indiana University Bloomington
- Occupations: Scholar; professor

John Gombojab Hangin (May 10, 1921 – October 9, 1989) was a Chahar Mongol scholar of Mongolian studies. He authored several Mongolian dictionaries and textbooks and is credited by The New York Times with helping to establish recognition for the Mongolian People's Republic from the United Nations and the United States.

== Biography ==
Hangin was born in Taibus Banner, Chahar, Inner Mongolia to a prominent family who had long been active in the Qing Dynasty court. His father was Fullehengge (1897–1936) and mother Galindari (1899–2001), and his grandfather was Samtanlhungrub (1878–1932), also known as the Sa Amban.

He studied Chinese, Mongolian, Manchu, and Tibetan at an early age, and was sent to Japan in 1937 for preparatory school, and in 1938 was persuaded to study at the School of Forestry of the Hokkaido Imperial University. In December 1941 he returned to Inner Mongolia, afterward taking a position as a secretary in the Mengjiang government of Prince Demchugdongrub. He was elected to the National Assembly of the Republic of China in 1947; however, after the Chinese Civil War ended with a communist victory, he emigrated to the United States in 1948.

=== In the United States ===
In the United States, Hangin worked at the Walter Hines Page School of International Relations of Johns Hopkins University as part of Owen Lattimore's Mongolia Project, founding the core of Mongolian studies in the United States. Here, Hangin was part of a group of Mongol intellectuals including Diluwa Khutugtu Jamsrangjab and Urgunge Onon. Due to the rise of McCarthyism and charges against Lattimore, the project was eventually shut down, and Hangin had a series of tenures at Georgetown University, University of California, Berkeley, and Columbia University (where he earned his master's degree in 1963). In 1961 he helped found the Mongolia Society, a private, non-profit, non-political organization promoting the study of Mongolia, its history, language, and culture.

He joined Indiana University Bloomington in 1965 and taught in the Mongolian Program of the Department of Uralic and Altaic Studies, earning a PhD in 1970 and becoming a full professor in 1982.

Working throughout his life to promote international recognition of Mongolia, he was invited to the ceremony establishing diplomatic relations between the United States and Mongolia in January 1987.

Together with Tsorj Lama, former Abbot of the Qorgho Monastery in Western Sonid Banner, he founded the Mongol-American Cultural Association in 1987.

=== Death and legacy ===
Hangin died of heart disease while doing research in Ulaanbaatar, Mongolia. He is buried in the Altan-Ölgii National Cemetery.

The Mongolia Society offers a scholarship in his name to Mongolian students who wish to study in the United States.

Hangin acted as a conduit between Americans and Mongolians. The New York Times, in its 1989 obituary, indicated that "[h]is efforts helped to lay the groundwork for recognition of the Mongolian People's Republic by the United Nations in 1961 and American recognition in 1987."
