= Mongolia–Japan Center =

Mosque in Sükhbaatar, Ulaanbaatar, Mongolia

- Монгол-Японы төв
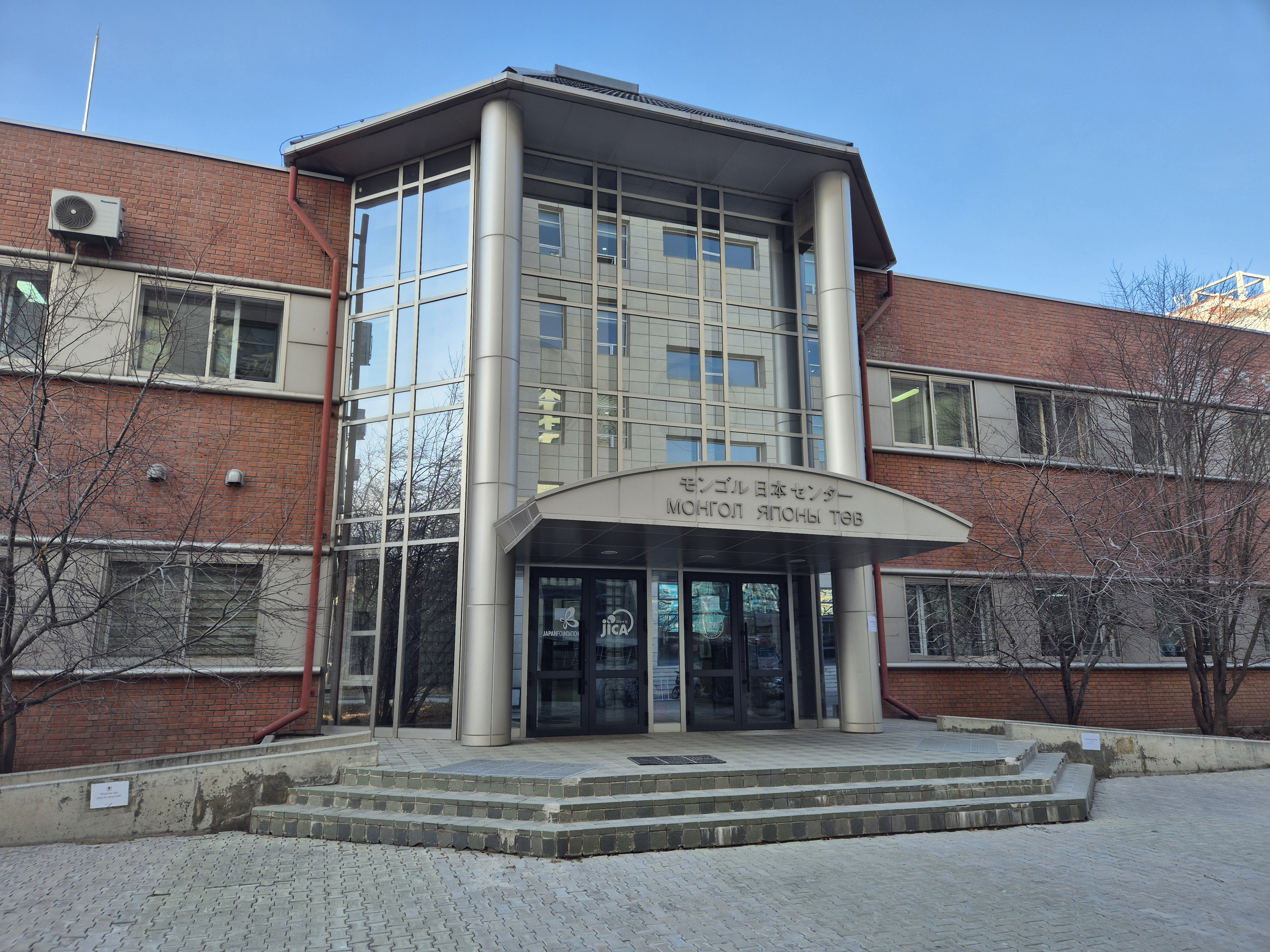
- Formation: June 2002
- Type: cultural center
- Location: Sükhbaatar, Ulaanbaatar, Mongolia
- Coordinates: 47°55′23″N 106°55′13″E
- Affiliations: National University of Mongolia
- Website: Official website

The Mongolia–Japan Center (Mongolian: Монгол-Японы төв) or Mongolia–Japan Center for Human Resources Development is a cultural center in National University of Mongolia, Sükhbaatar District, Ulaanbaatar, Mongolia.

== History ==
The center was established in June 2002 through the cooperation between Japan International Cooperation Agency, Ministry of Education and Science and National University of Mongolia.

== Activities ==
The center provides various activities related to Japanese cultures and also Japanese language class.

== See also ==
- Japan–Mongolia relations
