= Taibus Banner =

Taibus Banner 太仆寺旗 • ᠲᠠᠶᠢᠫᠤᠰᠧ ᠬᠣᠰᠢᠭᠤ Taipus, Taipusi
- Banner
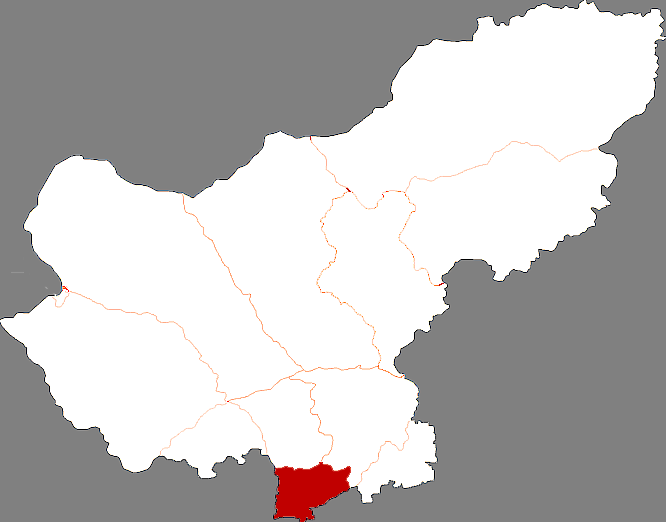
- Taibus in Xilin Gol

- Xilin Gol in Inner Mongolia

- Location in Inner Mongolia Taibus (China)
- Coordinates: 41°52′44″N 115°16′59″E
- Country: China
- Autonomous region: Inner Mongolia
- League: Xilin Gol
- Banner seat: Baochang

Area
  - Total: 3,426.14 km^{2} (1,322.84 sq mi)

Population (2020)
  - Total: 109,370
  - Density: 31.922/km^{2} (82.678/sq mi)
- Time zone: UTC+8 (China Standard)
- Website: www.tpsq.gov.cn

Taibus Banner

Chinese name
- Simplified Chinese: 太仆寺旗
- Traditional Chinese: 太僕寺旗
Transcriptions
Standard Mandarin
- Hanyu Pinyin: Tàipúsì Qí

Mongolian name
- Mongolian Cyrillic: Тайвас хошуу
- Mongolian script: ᠲᠠᠶᠢᠫᠤᠰᠧ ᠬᠣᠰᠢᠭᠤ
Transcriptions
- SASM/GNC: Taiwas hoshuu

Taibus Banner or Taipus Banner (Mongolian: ᠲᠠᠶᠢᠫᠤᠰᠧ ᠬᠣᠰᠢᠭᠤ pronounced [ˈtʰɛːw̜əs χɞˈʃʊː]; Chinese: 太仆寺旗) is a banner of Inner Mongolia, China, bordering Hebei province to the southeast, south, and west. It is under the administration of Xilin Gol League and is its southernmost county-level division.

== Demographics ==
Taibus Banner has a population of 109,370.

The proportion of nationalities in Taibus Banner (2020)
Nationality	Percentage
Han	92.9%
Mongols	4.1%
Manchus	2.6%
Hui People	0.3%
Others	0.1%
Source of the population statistics :

== Administrative divisions ==
Taibus Banner is divided into 5 towns, 1 township, and 1 sum.

Name	Simplified Chinese	Hanyu Pinyin	Mongolian (Hudum Script)	Mongolian (Cyrillic)	Administrative division code
Towns
Baochang Town	宝昌镇	Bǎochāng Zhèn	ᠪᠣᠣᠴᠠᠩ ᠪᠠᠯᠭᠠᠰᠤ	Бууцан балгас	152527100
Qianjingou Town	千斤沟镇	Qiānjīngōu Zhèn	ᠴᠢᠶᠠᠨ ᠵᠢᠨ ᠭᠧᠦ ᠪᠠᠯᠭᠠᠰᠤ	Чонгийн гүү балгас	152527101
Hongqi Town	红旗镇	Hóngqí Zhèn	ᠬᠤᠩ ᠴᠢ ᠪᠠᠯᠭᠠᠰᠤ	Хон чи балгас	152527102
Luotuoshan Town	骆驼山镇	Luòtuóshān Zhèn	ᠯᠦᠸᠧ ᠲᠦᠸᠧ ᠱᠠᠨ ᠪᠠᠯᠭᠠᠰᠤ	Лүве түве шин балгас	152527103
Yongfeng Town	永丰镇	Yǒngfēng Zhèn	ᠶᠦᠩ ᠹᠧᠩ ᠪᠠᠯᠭᠠᠰᠤ	Юн фен балгас	152527104
Township
Xingfu Township	幸福乡	Xìngfú Xiāng	ᠰᠢᠩ ᠹᠦ᠋ ᠰᠢᠶᠠᠩ	Шин фү шиян	152527200
Township
Gun Bulag Sum	贡宝拉格苏木	Gòngbǎolāgé Sūmù	ᠭᠦᠨᠪᠤᠯᠠᠭ ᠰᠤᠮᠤ	Хнбулаг сум	152527201

Other: Wanshoutan Seed Farm (万寿滩良种场)(ᠸᠠᠨ ᠱᠧᠦ ᠲᠠᠨ ᠦᠷ᠎ᠡ ᠶᠢᠨ ᠲᠠᠯᠠᠪᠠᠢ)

== Climate ==
Climate data for Taibus Banner, elevation 1,469 m (4,820 ft), (1991–2020 normals, extremes 1981–present)
Month	Jan	Feb	Mar	Apr	May	Jun	Jul	Aug	Sep	Oct	Nov	Dec	Year
Record high °C (°F)	4.3 (39.7)	10.8 (51.4)	19.7 (67.5)	27.6 (81.7)	31.9 (89.4)	33.5 (92.3)	36.4 (97.5)	32.0 (89.6)	31.2 (88.2)	23.2 (73.8)	16.2 (61.2)	9.6 (49.3)	36.4 (97.5)
Mean daily maximum °C (°F)	−10.0 (14.0)	−5.0 (23.0)	2.8 (37.0)	11.6 (52.9)	18.4 (65.1)	22.9 (73.2)	25.0 (77.0)	23.6 (74.5)	18.4 (65.1)	10.2 (50.4)	0.2 (32.4)	−8.1 (17.4)	9.2 (48.5)
Daily mean °C (°F)	−16.2 (2.8)	−11.8 (10.8)	−3.8 (25.2)	4.7 (40.5)	11.8 (53.2)	16.6 (61.9)	19.1 (66.4)	17.5 (63.5)	11.7 (53.1)	3.6 (38.5)	−6.1 (21.0)	−14.0 (6.8)	2.8 (37.0)
Mean daily minimum °C (°F)	−21.0 (−5.8)	−17.4 (0.7)	−9.7 (14.5)	−1.8 (28.8)	5.0 (41.0)	10.4 (50.7)	13.6 (56.5)	11.9 (53.4)	5.7 (42.3)	−2.0 (28.4)	−11.3 (11.7)	−18.7 (−1.7)	−2.9 (26.7)
Record low °C (°F)	−34.2 (−29.6)	−32.2 (−26.0)	−26.6 (−15.9)	−14.6 (5.7)	−7.4 (18.7)	−2.7 (27.1)	5.6 (42.1)	1.9 (35.4)	−6.0 (21.2)	−18.8 (−1.8)	−27.7 (−17.9)	−30.2 (−22.4)	−34.2 (−29.6)
Average precipitation mm (inches)	3.4 (0.13)	4.6 (0.18)	7.8 (0.31)	20.0 (0.79)	39.2 (1.54)	63.8 (2.51)	98.7 (3.89)	73.5 (2.89)	51.1 (2.01)	21.1 (0.83)	10.3 (0.41)	4.5 (0.18)	398 (15.67)
Average precipitation days (≥ 0.1 mm)	5.8	5.7	5.4	6.4	8.3	12.1	13.5	10.7	9.6	6.6	6.2	6.6	96.9
Average snowy days	10.7	9.8	8.3	5.6	1.3	0	0	0	0.8	4.5	9.2	12.1	62.3
Average relative humidity (%)	69	62	50	42	44	56	67	67	60	57	62	68	59
Mean monthly sunshine hours	207.3	215.2	258.0	263.5	284.3	265.1	260.9	259.7	238.9	234.0	200.3	192.4	2,879.6
Percentage possible sunshine	70	71	69	65	63	58	57	61	65	69	69	68	65
Source: China Meteorological Administration all-time May high
