= Baochang, Taibus Banner =

Coordinates: 41°53′N 115°17′E

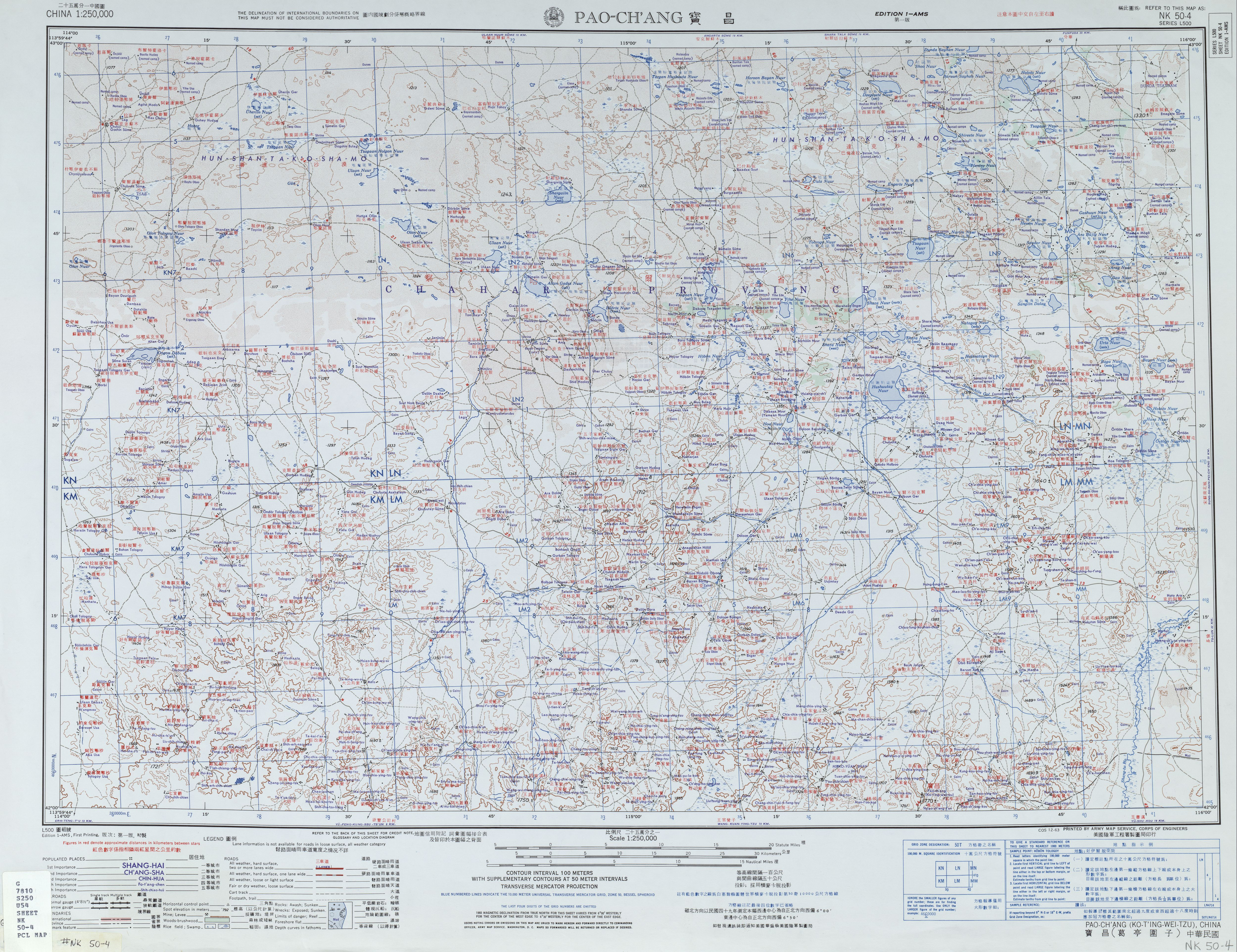
Map including Baochang (labeled as 寶昌 Pao-ch'ang (Ko-t'ing-wei-tzu)) (AMS, 1963)

Baochang is a town, and the administrative center of the Taibus Banner in the Xilin Gol League, Inner Mongolia, China. It was the county seat of Bǎochāng (寶昌) County when it was part of the former Chahar province.

== Geography ==
Baochang covers an area of 256 square kilometers, with an urban area of 22.1 square kilometers. The town currently has 124,200 acres of arable land, including 35,000 acres of irrigated land. Additionally, there are 169,000 acres of pastureland.

== Population ==
The registered population is 29,100 households with 58,000 people, while the resident population is 28,900 households with 55,100 people.
