= Japanese language education in Mongolia =

Language education in Mongolia

Japanese language education in Mongolia formally dates back to 1975, when the National University of Mongolia established an elective course in Japanese language. A 2003 survey found 199 teachers teaching 9,080 students of Japanese at 67 different institutions. As of 2024, according to the Japan Foundation, 16,123 people were learning Japanese in Mongolia.

== Opportunities and motivations for study ==
The study of Japanese in Mongolia, in common with the study of English and German language, began to expand early in the 1990s in the so-called "language boom" which occurred as the country began to liberalise. In the 1970s and 1980s, only 3-5 students enrolled each year in the single Japanese course offered by the National University of Mongolia; Mongolians who went to Japan as international scholarship students typically had little language preparation beforehand, and took courses at the Osaka University of Foreign Studies to catch up before beginning their subject-area studies. However, the situation began to improve in the late 1980s, when NUM established an evening course in Japanese, and in 1989, when two more non-school institutions began offering Japanese courses. NUM established a full major in the subject in 1990; one school also began offering Japanese language instruction to primary and secondary students that year.

The Ministry of Education has not established a standardised curriculum for Japanese language instruction at the secondary levels, as it has for the mandatory foreign languages of English and Russian. Primary and secondary students compose only 13.6% of all students of Japanese in the country; the rest are divided roughly equally between institutions of higher education and non-school institutions. However, the student-teacher ratios are much more favourable in institutions of higher education, with roughly 33 students per teacher, as compared to 109 students per teacher in non-school institutions. Textbooks in use mainly consist of those donated by the Japan Foundation; the beginners' textbook Nihongo Shoho (日本語初歩) is one of the more popular ones. A textbook aimed specifically at Mongolian learners was published in July 1996.

Common motivations for language learning include the desire to study in Japan, to understand Japanese culture, and to learn about Japanese technology; tourism and the desire to learn about Japanese politics in contrast were not widely cited as reasons for learning the language. Teachers feel there are a sufficient number of beginning and intermediate level courses, but not enough advanced-level courses.

== Language-based difficulties ==
Mongolian grammar is somewhat similar to that of Japanese. Most Mongolian case markers have direct parallels among Japanese particles, but, for example, the nominative case in Mongolian is unmarked, and the objective-case marker is sometimes dropped, especially when the object is definite; beginning Mongolian learners of Japanese carry the same habits over into Japanese, resulting in errors. One distinction that is difficult for learners in Mongolia is that between the locative particles ni and de, used respectively to describe the location of existence and the location of the action of a verb; Mongolian does not distinguish between the two. The usage of verbs for "to come" and "to go" also differs slightly.

The expectation of most learners of Japanese in Mongolia is that courses should focus on the teaching of kanji, to the exclusion of other aspects of the language; teachers report that this is especially a problem due to pressure from parents of students at the elementary and secondary levels.

== Standardised testing ==
JLPT examinees in Mongolia
Year	City	Examinees by Level				
Year	City	L1	L2	L3	L4	Total
2006	Ulaanbaatar	129	334	246	104	813
2005	Ulaanbaatar	151	276	269	100	796
2004	Ulaanbaatar	112	246	214	123	695
2003	Ulaanbaatar	100	133	164	67	464
2002	Data missing					
2001	Data missing					
2000	Ulaanbaatar	31	148	147	83	439

The Japanese Language Proficiency Test has been offered in Mongolia since 2000. As of 2006, it was offered only in Ulaanbaatar. The number of examinees rose by 75% between 2003 and 2006; as in China and South Korea, but differing from other Asian countries, the Level 2 examination, aimed at students who have completed 600 contact hours of instruction, is the most widely attempted, and the Level 4 examination, aimed at beginning students with 150 contact hours of instruction, is the least popular. JETRO's Business Japanese Test was not offered in Mongolia as of 2006.

== See also ==
- Japanese as a foreign language
- Education in Mongolia
