= Diluwa Khutugtu Jamsrangjab =

Mongolian Tibetan Buddhist leader, politician and scholar (1883–1965)

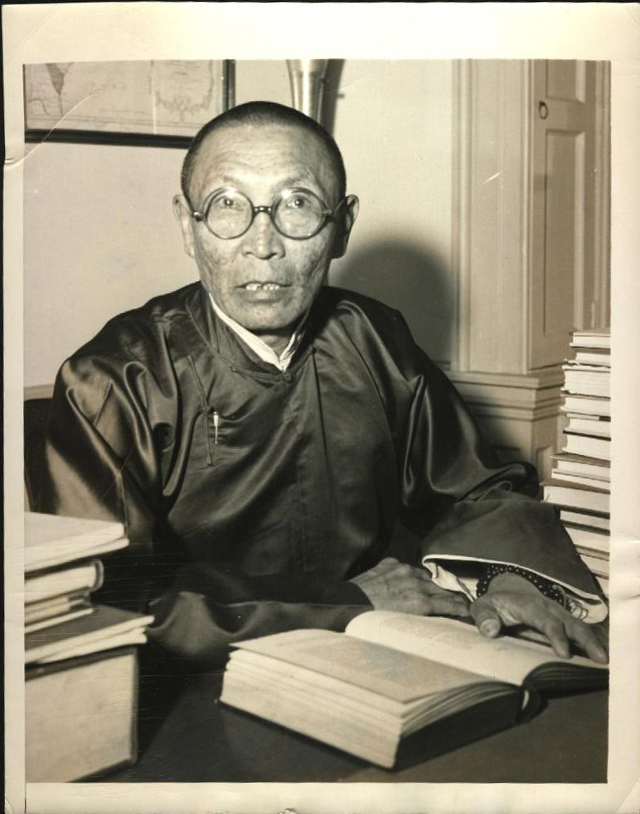
- Diluwa Khutugtu Jamsrangjab in 1949

Personal life
- Born: 1883 Zagdsambar, Zavkhan Aimag, Mongolia
- Died: 7 April 1965 (aged 81–82) New York City, New York, United States

Religious life
- Religion: Tibetan Buddhism
- School: Gelug

Senior posting
- Period in office: c. 1888–1965
- Successor: Erdne Ombadykow
- Reincarnation: Tilopa

Diluwa Khutugtu Jamsrangjab (Mongolian: Дилав Хутагт Жамсанжав, 1883 – 7 April 1965) was a Mongolian Tibetan Buddhist religious leader, politician and scholar. His autobiography was published in English.

When Jamsrangjab was born to commoners, Bashlu and Gimbeles, in Zagdsambar of Zasagt Khan aimag (in modern Zavkhan Province), there spread mysterious but amazing tales about his birth. At the age of five, Bogd Khan declared Jamsrangjab to be the tulku of Tilopa. Jamsrangjab with his parents moved to the capital city Niislel Khuree. He studied the philosophy of Buddhism and was awarded religious dignities at the age of seven and 21.

In 1916 the Diluwa Khutugtu was sent to the south-eastern frontier of the Bogd Khanate of Mongolia with general Khatanbaatar Magsarjav to ease the conflict between the Mongols and the Republic of China.

Diluwa Khutugtu Jamsrangjab was arrested in 1930 due to the accusation that he was linked with the so-called anti-communist leader, Eregdendagva. He was freed later after he didn't accept the trial. On 26 February 1931, Jamsrangjab fled to China. After he had gone, false rumours about him spread among people. At the time, he didn't know he would never come back to his homeland again.

After he came to the United States in 1949 with the assistance of Owen Lattimore and fellow professors, Jamsranjab worked at the Johns Hopkins University. There he joined American-British professor Owen Lattimore's the Mongolia Project. In Howell, New Jersey, he founded a monastery with Kalmyk American lamas in 1950-1952. He was elected the chief lama of the monastery there. When he was in the US, he still worked for the international recognition of Mongolian independence.

When Lattimore fell under suspicion of being a Soviet spy in 1950, a secret tip to the Tydings Committee accused Jamsrangjab of being the "King Communist" and a "Mongolian Jew" whose true name was "Prince Abdul Baraba Baha". The Committee took this seriously enough to forward the letter to J. Edgar Hoover. In fact this was part of a small genre of conspiracy literature naming "Satan who today is the Turko-Mongol Jew, Prince Abdul Baraba Baha" of Johns Hopkins University, explaining that he was "proclaimed in 1950 to be Jewry's god by Jewry's Grand Orient Freemasonic Lodge of B'nai B'rith in New York City."

He influenced Chang Kai-shek to declare "Mongolia can be a member of the United Nations like other independent nations" in 1960. On 7 April 1965, Jamsrangjab died at the age of 82 in New York City. In 1990, the Supreme Court of Mongolia proved his innocence and abolished all decrees that accused him of false political crimes.

Preceded by Tilopa	Telo Tulku Rinpoché	Succeeded by Erdne Ombadykow
