= Justin Qiang =

Chinese baseball player

- Catcher
- Born: Meldro Gungkar County, Tibet
- Bats: Left Throws: Right

Justin Qiang (simplified Chinese: 强巴仁增; traditional Chinese: 強巴仁增; pinyin: Qiángbā Rénzēng; Tibetan: Jampa Rigzin, བྱམས་པ་རིག་འཛིན) is a Chinese baseball player. He became the first player from Tibet ever signed to a major league contract when he signed with the Boston Red Sox organization in 2018.

== Career ==
He became the first player from Tibet ever signed to a major league contract when he signed with the Boston Red Sox organization in 2018. playing that season with the Rookie-level Gulf Coast League Red Sox. He was released on January 31, 2020, becoming a free agent.
