= Drikungpa =

Head of the Drikung Kagyu, a sect of Tibetan Buddhism

The Drikungpa, or more formally the Drikung Kyabgön, is the head of the Drikung Kagyu, a sub-school of the Kagyu (བཀའ་བརྒྱུད, Wylie: bka' brgyud), itself one of the four major schools of Tibetan Buddhism.

Like all other Kagyu lineages, the origins of Drikung Kagyu can be traced back to the Great Indian Master Tilopa who passed on his teachings to Mahasiddha Naropa who lived around the 10th and 11th century. The founder of the Drikung Kagyu lineage was Jigten Sumgön (1143-1217) of the Kyura clan, who was the disciple of Phagmo Drupa. According to historical account from the time, Jigten Sumgön's teachings attracted more than 100,000 people at a time, with the highest number of attendance recorded at 130,000.

From the founding of Drikung Thil Monastery in 1179 to the present day, the Drikung Kagyu lineage has been led by a succession of spiritual heads ("throne-holders"). One of the two current heads of the lineage, Drikung Kyabgön Chetsang Rinpoche, Könchok Tenzin Kunzang Thinley Lhundrup (b. 1946), the 37th Drikungpa resides at Drikung Kagyu Institute at Dehra Dun, India. The other head of the Drikung Kagyu Lineage, the 36th Drikungpa, Drikung Kyabgön Chungtsang Rinpoche, Könchok Tenzin Chökyi Nangwa (b. 1942) lives in Lhasa, Tibet.

== Lineage timeline ==
According to The Great Kagyu Masters, the lineage succession is as follows:

Name	Date of Birth	Date of Death	Year Lineage Holding Begun	Year Lineage Holding Relinquished
Phagmodrupa	1110	1170		
Lord Jigten Sumgon	1143	1217	1179	1217
Kenchen Gurawa Tsultrim Dorje	1154	1221	1217	1221
On Rinpoche Sonam Drakpa	1187	1234	1221	1234
Chen-nga Rinpoche Drakpa Jungne	1175	1255	1234	1255
Telo Dorje Drakpa	1210	1278	1255	1278
Thog-khawa Rinchen Senge	1226	1284	1278	1284
Chen-nga tsamchedpa Drakpa Sonam	1238	1286	1284	1286
Dorje Yeshe	1223	1293	1286	1293
Chu-nyipa Dorje Rinchen	1278	1314	1293	1314
Nyer-gyepa Dorje Gyalpo	1283	1350	1314	1350
Nyermyipa Chökyi Gyalpo	1335	1407	1350	1395
Shenyen Dondrup Gyalpo	1369	1427	1395	1427
Dakpo Wang	1395	(Note: According to The Great Kagyu Masters (Gyaltsen (2006), p. 270), "he went to Five Peaked Mountain in China and achieved the state of immortality." Chetsang Rinpoche is considered an emanation of Chenrezig.)	1427	1428
Chogyal Rinchen Pal Zangpo	1421	1469	1428	1469
Rinchen Chökyi Gyaltsen	1449	1484	1469	1484
Gyalwang Kunga Rinchen	1475	1527	1484	1527
Gyalwang Rinchen Phuntsok	1509	1557	1527	1534
Rinchen Namgyal Chodak Gyaltsen	1527	1570	1565	1570
Chokyi Namgyal	1557	1579	1570	1579
Tsungme Chogyal Phuntsok	1547	1602	1579	1602
Naro Nyipa Tashi Phuntsok	1574	1628	1602	1615
Jetsǖn Könchog Rinchen (1st Chetsang) (Note: They are not considered brothers by blood, but by lineage.)	1580	1654	1615	1626
Kunkhyen Chökyi Dragpa (1st Chungtsang) (Note: Chungtsang Rinpoche is considered the emanation of both Padmasambhava and Manjushri. Also, one of the Drikung Kyabgŏns.)	1595	1659	1626	1659
Könchog trinley Sangpo (Chetsang)	1656	1718	1659	1718
Trinley Dondrub Chogyal (Chungtsang)	1704	1754	1704	1754
Kônchog Tenzin Drodul (Chetsang)	1724	1766	1724	1766
Könchog Tenzin Chökyi Nyima (Chuntsang)	1755	1792	1755	1792
Tenzin Padme Gyaltsen (Chetsang)	1770	1826	1770	1826
Tenzin Chöwang Lodrô (Regent)			1826	1827
Jetsǖn Chonyi Norbu (Chungtsang)	1827	1865	1827	1865
Könchog Thukie Nyima (Chetsang)	1828	1881	1828	1881
Könchog Tenzin Chôkyi Lodrö (Chungtsang)	1868	1906	1868	1906
Könchog Tenzin Zhiwe Lodrö (Chetsang)	1886	1943	1886	1943
Tenzin Chökyi Jungme (Chungtsang)	1909	1940	1909	1940
Tenzin Thuben Wangpo (Regent)			1940	1942
Tenzin Chökyi Nangwa (Chungtsang)	1942		1942	
Könchog Tenzin Kunzang Thinley Lhundrup (Chetsang)	1946		1946	

== See also ==
- Karmapa
- Shamarpa
