= Sijin =

Sijin may refer to:

- Sijin Latso a lake
- Xiao Sijin Chinese diplomat
