= Kunggar =

- Town

Tibetan transcription(s)

Chinese transcription(s)
- Location within Tibet
- Coordinates: 29°50′N 91°44′E
- Country: China
- Province: Tibet Autonomous Region
- Prefecture: Lhasa Prefecture
- County: Maizhokunggar County
- Time zone: UTC+8 (CST)

Kunggar or Maizhokunggar is a small town and the seat of Maizhokunggar County in the Lhasa Prefecture in the Tibet Autonomous Region of China. It is especially noted for its pottery, which non-corrodible, heat retaining and in an ethnic style. It has a more-than-1000-year-old history.

== See also ==
- List of towns and villages in Tibet
