= 2013 Gyama Mine landslide =

Mining disaster in Tibet, China

- Date: 29 March 2013
- Location: Tibet Autonomous Region, People's Republic of China
- Deaths: 66 dead, 17 missing

The 2013 Gyama Mine Landslide occurred on 29 March 2013 at about 06:00 local time (March 28, 2013 at 22:00 GMT). 83 people were trapped in the Gyama Mine (甲玛矿区) in Maizhokunggar County, Tibet Autonomous Region, China. The mining area is situated about 70 km east of Lhasa and has an altitude of about 4600 m. The landslide was about 3 km long and between 20 m and 50 m thick, with a volume of about 2 million cubic meters. Among the 83 people, 2 are ethnic Tibetans and the rest are ethnic Han, most of them from the Provinces of Yunnan, Guizhou, and Sichuan. As of April 5, 66 bodies have been found.

The Gyama Mine is operated by Huatailong Mining Development (华泰龙矿业开发公司), a subsidiary of the China National Gold Group Corporation (中国黄金集团), a state-owned enterprise and the country's largest gold producer. The operation of the Gyama Mine by China National Gold Group Corporation had been reported as eco-friendly and praised as a model for development by Chinese media. Criticisms over possibly excessive mining in Tibet flashed in China on the internet before they were deleted or blocked.

According to the experts of the Department of Land and Resources of China, four factors caused this mine disaster. First, the site of the landslides is located in a very steep V-shaped valley. Second, Tibet has a very complex geological condition, and there are a lot of neotectonic activities. Third, the area experienced several snowfalls in March 2013 after an extreme dry period between November 2012 to February 2013, and the infiltration of water from the melted snow decreased the stability of the slope. Fourth, the process of the landslides is that the accumulation body in the back lost its stability, started the slip, and pushed the accumulation body in the front, and thus was formed the overall slip.
