= Mamba Township =

Mamba
- Township

Tibetan transcription(s)

Chinese transcription(s)
  - Traditional: 门巴乡
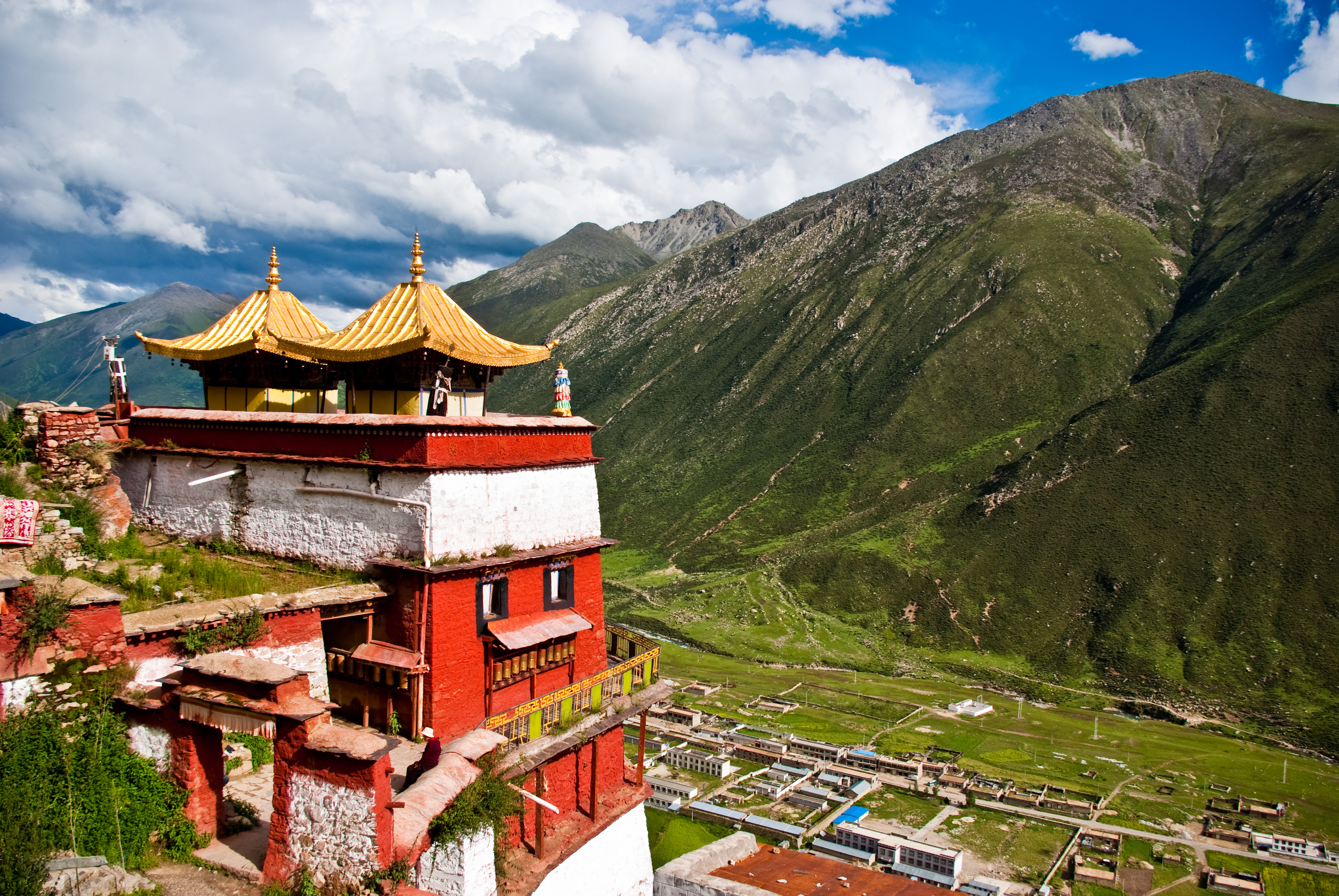
- View from Drigung Monastery

- Location within Tibet
- Coordinates: 30°06′12″N 92°12′54″E
- Country: China
- Province: Tibet Autonomous Region
- Prefecture: Lhasa Prefecture
- County: Maizhokunggar County

Area
  - Total: 822 km^{2} (317 sq mi)

Population
  - Total: 2,900
- Time zone: UTC+8 (CST)

Mamba (Chinese: 门巴乡) is a small town and township-level division in Lhasa prefecture-level city in Maizhokunggar County in the Tibet Autonomous Region of China. Administratively it is divided into six village-level divisional units, and the township covers an area of 822 square kilometres (317 sq mi), with a population of about 2,900. Animal husbandry, with the rearing of yak, sheep, goats, and agriculture, with the principal crops being barley, wheat, and canola, is predominant. Geologically, Late Triassic granitoids in the area are mainly "exposed in a fault uplift in the Gangdise tectonic belt". The township is home to Drigung Monastery.

== See also ==
- List of towns and villages in Tibet
