= Zaxoi Township =

Zaxoi
- Township

Tibetan transcription(s)

Chinese transcription(s)
- Location within Tibet
- Coordinates: 30°06′N 91°46′E
- Country: China
- Province: Tibet Autonomous Region
- Prefecture: Lhasa Prefecture
- County: Maizhokunggar County
- Time zone: UTC+8 (CST)

Zaxoi is a small town and township in Maizhokunggar County the Lhasa Prefecture in the Tibet Autonomous Region of China.

== See also ==
- List of towns and villages in Tibet
