= Drikung Kagyu =

One of the eight "minor" lineages of the Kagyü school of Tibetan Buddhism

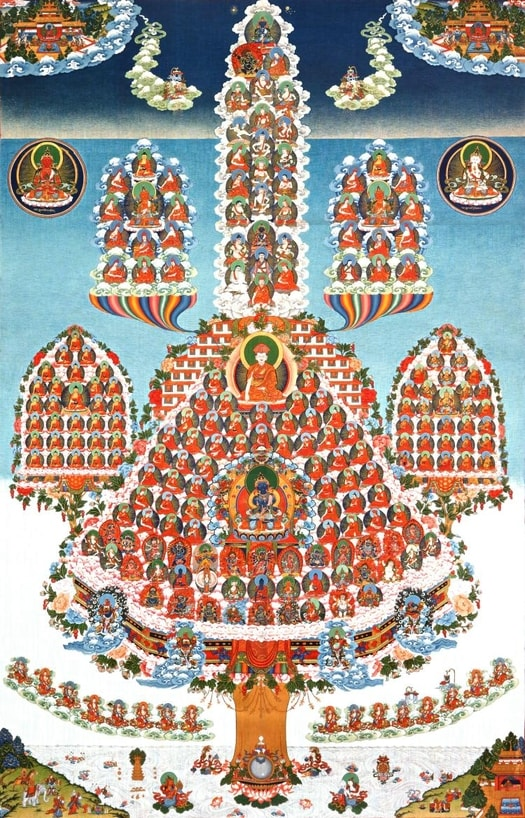
Drikung Kagyu Lineage Tree

Drikung Kagyü or Drigung Kagyü (Wylie: 'bri-gung bka'-brgyud) is one of the eight "minor" lineages of the Kagyu school of Tibetan Buddhism. "Major" here refers to those Kagyü lineages founded by the immediate disciples of Gampopa (1079-1153), while "minor" refers to all the lineages founded by disciples of Gampopa's main disciple, Phagmo Drupa (1110-1170). One of these disciples, Jigten Sumgön (1143-1217), is the founder of Drikung.

== History ==
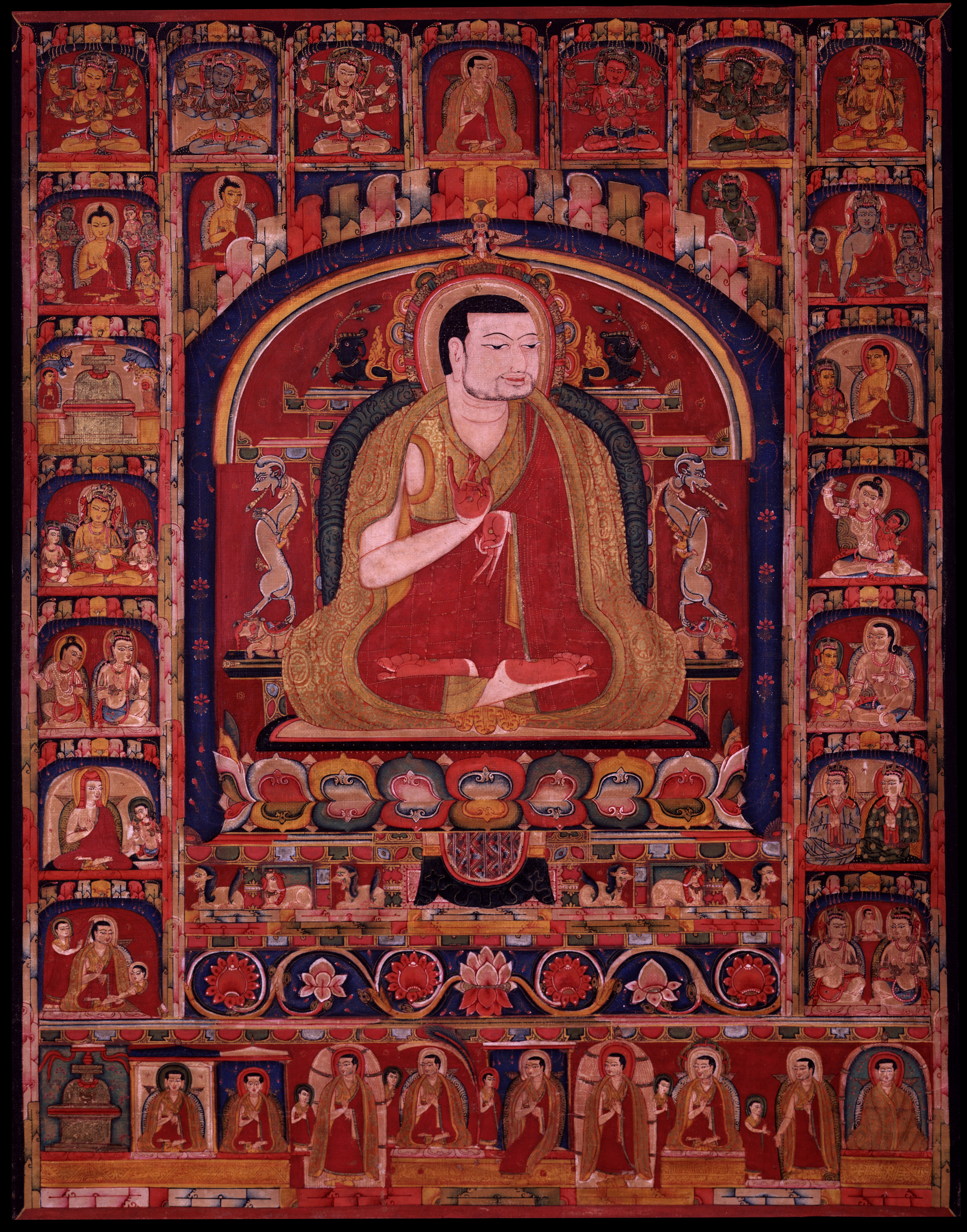
Phagmodrupa with His Previous Incarnations and Episodes from His Life, 14th-century painting from the Rubin Museum of Art

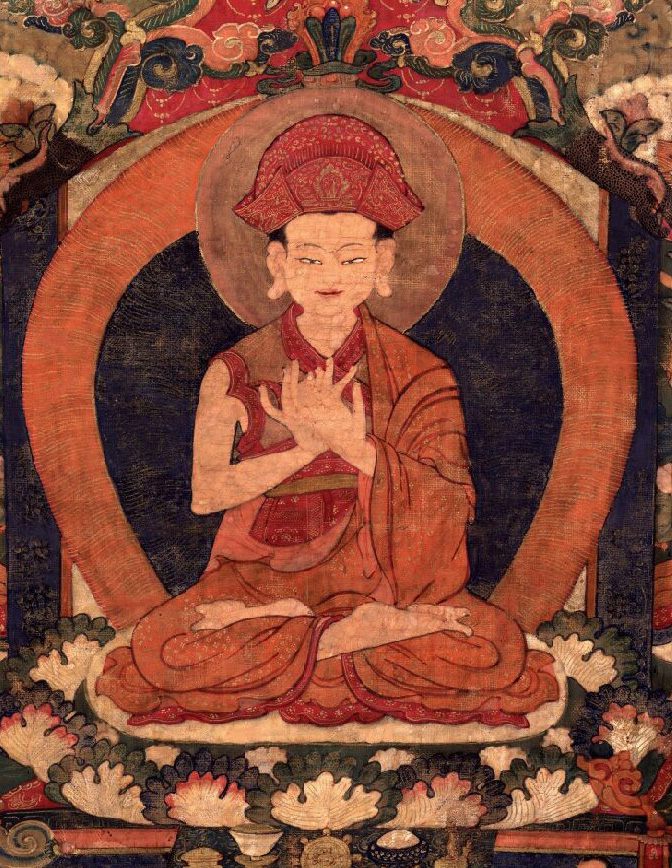
Jigten Sumgon, founder of Drikung Kagyü

Like with all other Kagyu lineages, origins of Drikung Kagyü can be traced back to the Great Indian Master Tilopa who passed on his teachings to Mahasiddha Naropa who lived around 10th and 11th century. The founder of the Drikung Kagyü lineage was Jigten Sumgön (1143-1217) of the Kyura clan, who was the disciple of Phagmo Drupa. According to historical account from the time, Jigten Sumgön's teachings attracted more than 100,000 people at a time, with the highest number of attendance recorded at 130,000.

Several sub-schools branched off from the Drikung Kagyü including the Lhapa or Lhanangpa Kagyü, founded by Nö Lhanangpa (Wylie: gnyos lha nang pa, 1164–1224) who came to Bhutan in 1194. This school was at one time important in Western Bhutan, particularly in the Thimphu and Paro regions, where they were rivals of the Drukpa Kagyü. The Lhapa first came into conflict with the early Drukpa teacher, Phajo Drugom Zhigpo (b. 12th century) and finally with Ngawang Namgyal (1594–1651). In 1640 the remaining followers of the Lhapa Kagyü were expelled from Bhutan together with the Nenyingpa followers as both had sided with the attacking Tsangpa forces against the Drukpa during their three invasions of Bhutan and continued to refuse to acknowledge the authority of the Shabdrung.

== Teaching and practice ==
The unique doctrines of Drikung Kagyü as taught by its founder, Jigten Sumgön is preserved in the "Single Intention" or "One Thought" (Gongchig, Wylie: dgongs gcig) and "The Essence of Mahāyāna Teachings" (Wylie: theg chen bstan pa'i snying po). According to Jampa MacKenzie Stewart, the Gonchik "recasts Buddhism in a fascinating and innovative form, emphasizing each aspect as being capable of revealing the full process of enlightenment."

The main practices of Drikung Kagyü are “The Five-fold Profound Path of Mahamudrā,” and “The Six Dharmas of Nāropa.” The five-fold Mahamudrā, also known as the "possessing five", consists of five elements:

- Setting the motivation, arousing bodhichitta,
- Deity yoga, generating the Yidam. The main deity in Drikung is Chakrasamvara (in union with consort Vajravarahi), but Milarepa taught this method by using Chenrezig.
- Guru yoga
- Mahamudrā meditation (Samatha and Vipasyana)
- Dedication of merit.

This practice is traditionally cultivated in retreat alongside the Six Dharmas of Naropa, and it is preceded by the preliminary practices called ngondro.

This presentation is outlined in Clarifying the Jewel Rosary of the Profound Five-Fold Path by Kunga Rinchen, the Dharma heir to Jigten Sumgön.

The Drikung Kagyü also have a tradition of Dzogchen teachings, the Yangzab Dzogchen. It is based on termas revealed by the Drikung Tertön (hidden treasure revealer), Rinchen Phuntsog in the sixteenth century.

=== Phowa ===
The Drikung lineage is popularly known for its development of the practice of Phowa, in which a practitioner learns how to expel his/her consciousness or mindstream through the posterior fontanelle at the top of the skull at the moment of death. One of the Six Yogas of Naropa, this practice is said to aid the practitioner in remaining aware through the death experience, thus aiding one in attaining enlightenment in the Bardo (the state in between death and the next rebirth) or in achieving a birth conducive to the practice of Dharma.

== Monasteries and centers ==
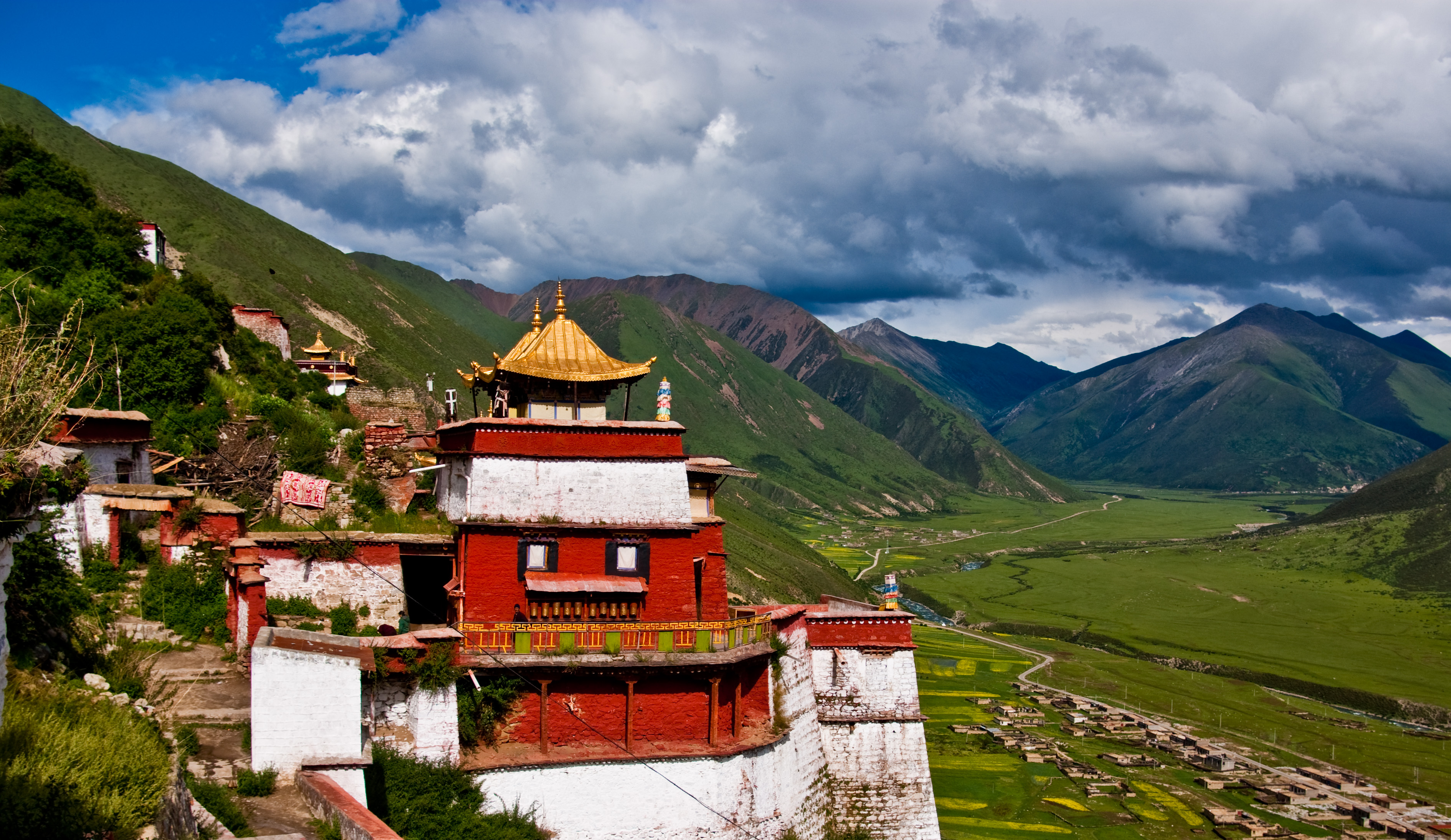
A building in Drikung monastery overlooking the valley, Maizhokunggar County, Lhasa, Tibet

The first and main Drikung Kagyü monastery is Drikung Thil Monastery, founded in 1179 by Jigten Sumgön approximately 150 kilometers northeast of Lhasa.

Aside from the Drikung Valley in Ü, the Drikung Kagyu has a strong presence in Nangqên County in what was Kham, in western Tibet (including Kailash), and in Ladakh. Tsari and Lapchi - two important sacred sites for all Tibetan Buddhists - also have a strong Drikung Kagyu presence. Among the so-called "four major and eight minor" Kagyu lineages, Drikung Kagyu is one of four Kagyu lineages that continue to exist as independent institutions (the other three being the Karma Kagyu, Drukpa Lineage and Taklung Kagyu).

Outside of Tibet, the headquarters for the tradition in exile is Jangchubling, located in Dhera Dun, in the Indian state of Uttarakhand.

Drikung Kagyu is one of the most prominent lineages in Ladakh where its main monasteries are Phyang and Lamayuru, with roughly 50 other monasteries spread across Ladakh region.

A series of Drikung Dharma centers were also founded in the West, a project begun by Drikung Kyabgon Chetsang Rinpoche in 1978.

== Lineage notes ==
=== Spiritual heads ===
From the founding of Drikung Thil Monastery in 1179 to the present day, the Drikung Kagyü lineage has been led by a succession of spiritual heads ("throne-holders"). One of the two current heads of the lineage, Drikung Kyabgön Chetsang Rinpoche, Könchok Tenzin Kunzang Thinley Lhundrup (b. 1946), the 37th Drikungpa resides at Drikung Kagyü Institute at Dehra Dun, India. The other head of the Drikung Kagyü Lineage, the 36th Drikungpa, Drikung Kyabgön Chungtsang Rinpoche, Könchok Tenzin Chökyi Nangwa (b. 1942) lives in Lhasa, Tibet.

=== Female protector ===
Another unique feature of the Drikung lineage is its female dharmapāla, Achi Chokyi Drolma. The great-grandmother of Jigten Sumgön, she prophesied his birth and vowed to protect those in his lineage. She is unusual in that she is both a female protector and an enlightened bodhisattva that can be taken as an iṣṭadevatā in meditation practice. She is depicted either sitting on a horse or standing with a kapala in her left hand and a mirror in her right hand. Achi's practice became so popular that she has been included in other lineages, such as the Karma Kagyu.

=== First nun ===
In 2002 Khenmo Drolma, an American woman, became the first bhikkhuni (a fully ordained Buddhist nun) in the Drikung Kagyü lineage. She is also the first westerner, male or female, to be installed as an abbot in the Drikung Kagyü lineage, having been installed as the abbot of the Vajra Dakini Nunnery (America's first Tibetan Buddhist nunnery, located in Vermont) in 2004.

== Lineage timeline ==
Name	Date of Birth	Date of Death	Year Lineage Holding Begun	Year Lineage Holding Relinquished
Phagmodrupa	1110	1170		
Lord Jigten Sumgon	1143	1217	1179	1217
Kenchen Gurawa Tsultrim Dorje	1154	1221	1217	1221
On Rinpoche Sonam Drakpa	1187	1234	1221	1234
Chen-nga Rinpoche Drakpa Jungne	1175	1255	1234	1255
Telo Dorje Drakpa	1210	1278	1255	1278
Thog-khawa Rinchen Senge	1226	1284	1278	1284
Chen-nga tsamchedpa Drakpa Sonam	1238	1286	1284	1286
Dorje Yeshe	1223	1293	1286	1293
Chu-nyipa Dorje Rinchen	1278	1314	1293	1314
Nyer-gyepa Dorje Gyalpo	1283	1350	1314	1350
Nyermyipa Chökyi Gyalpo	1335	1407	1350	1395
Shenyen Dondrup Gyalpo	1369	1427	1395	1427
Dakpo Wang	1395		1427	1428
Chogyal Rinchen Pal Zangpo	1421	1469	1428	1469
Rinchen Chökyi Gyaltsen	1449	1484	1469	1484
Gyalwang Kunga Rinchen	1475	1527	1484	1527
Gyalwang Rinchen Phuntsok	1509	1557	1527	1534
Rinchen Namgyal Chodak Gyaltsen	1527	1570	1565	1570
Chokyi Namgyal	1557	1579	1570	1579
Tsungme Chogyal Phuntsok	1547	1602	1579	1602
Naro Nyipa Tashi Phuntsok	1574	1628	1602	1615
Jetsǖn Könchog Rinchen (1st Chetsang)	1580	1654	1615	1626
Kunkhyen Chökyi Dragpa (1st Chungtsang)	1595	1659	1626	1659
Könchog trinley Sangpo (Chetsang)	1656	1718	1659	1718
Trinley Dondrub Chogyal (Chungtsang)	1704	1754	1704	1754
Kônchog Tenzin Drodul (Chetsang)	1724	1766	1724	1766
Könchog Tenzin Chökyi Nyima (Chuntsang)	1755	1792	1755	1792
Tenzin Padme Gyaltsen (Chetsang)	1770	1826	1770	1826
Tenzin Chöwang Lodrô (Regent)			1826	1827
Jetsǖn Chonyi Norbu (Chungtsang)	1827	1865	1827	1865
Könchog Thukie Nyima (Chetsang)	1828	1881	1828	1881
Könchog Tenzin Chôkyi Lodrö (Chungtsang)	1868	1906	1868	1906
Könchog Tenzin Zhiwe Lodrö (Chetsang)	1886	1943	1886	1943
Tenzin Chökyi Jungme (Chungtsang)	1909	1940	1909	1940
Tenzin Thuben Wangpo (Regent)			1940	1942
Tenzin Chökyi Nangwa (Chungtsang)	1942		1942	
Könchog Tenzin Kunzang Thinley Lhundrup (Chetsang)	1946		1946	
