= Gongchig =

Tibetan Buddhist teaching

The Gongchig (Wylie: dgongs gcig, "Single Intention" or "One Thought") is a book of commentary on the Buddha's teaching by Jigten Sumgon (1143–1217), the founder of the Drikung Kagyu lineage who is believed to be the reincarnation of Nagarjuna. He taught the Dharma to several thousand students for forty years.

== Composition ==
The Gongchig was written out by his heart disciple Won Sherab Jungne (1187–1241). It is a late summary of the Buddha's teachings, in which Jigten Sumgon laid out the path of the Buddha's teachings as well as actual practice.

The Gongchig is composed of 152 primary vajra statements with 46 supplemental vajra statements. Won Sherab Jungne arranged these vajra statements into eight chapters of varying length:

1. Summary of the Key Points of the Wheel of Dharma (30 Statements)
2. Summary of the essential points of the emergence in dependence (15 statements)
3. Summary of the Essential Points of the Vinaya Pratimoksha (20 Statements)
4. Summary of the Essential Points of the Bodhisattva Training (24 Statements)
5. Summary of the knowledge holder of the secret mantra (28 statements)
6. The special view, meditation and behavior (20 statements)
7. The Resulting Ground of Buddhahood (15 Statements)
8. Additional statements (46 statements)

== English translations ==
- 'Jig-rten-mgon-po ('Bri-guṅ Chos-rje) (2009). Göbel, Claudia (ed.). Gongchig: The Single Intent, the Sacred Dharma. Germany: Otter. ISBN 978-3-933529-28-2.
- Sobisch, Jan-Ulrich (2020). The Buddha's Single Intention: Drigung Kyobpa Jikten Sumgön's Vajra Statements of the Early Kagyü Tradition. Wisdom Publications. ISBN 978-1-61429-639-3.

== Commentaries ==
Chennga Dorje Sherab (12–13th centuries) wrote two extensive commentaries collectively known as the Dorshema (rdor she ma, a contraction of the name Dorje Sherab):

- The Lamp of Illuminated Wisdom (snang mdzad ye shes sgron ma)
- O Gema ('od ge ma).
