= Sijin Latso =

Lake in Tibet, China

Coordinates: 29°46′50″N 92°23′20″E

Sijinlatso (思金拉错), also known as Sijin Latso, Sijin Lacuo or Shijianlame, is a sacred lake is located in Mozhugongka County, from the Sichuan-Tibet highway about 6 kilometers (3.7 mi), 66 kilometers (41 mi) from the county, 124 kilometers (77 mi) from Lhasa city, elevation 4,500 meters (14,800 ft). Its Tibetan name means "God of Wealth".

== Geography ==
The lake is rich in biodiversity. Among them are snowdrops, Ophiocordyceps sinensis, Rumex crispus and other precious medicinal herbs. Snow chickens, pheasants and quails, rock sheep, deer, alpine sheep, roe deer, etc. can be seen everywhere in the mountains, and sometimes wolves, horses, bears, leopards and other wild animals are also seen.
