= Jigten Sumgön =

- འཇིག་རྟེན་གསུམ་མགོན
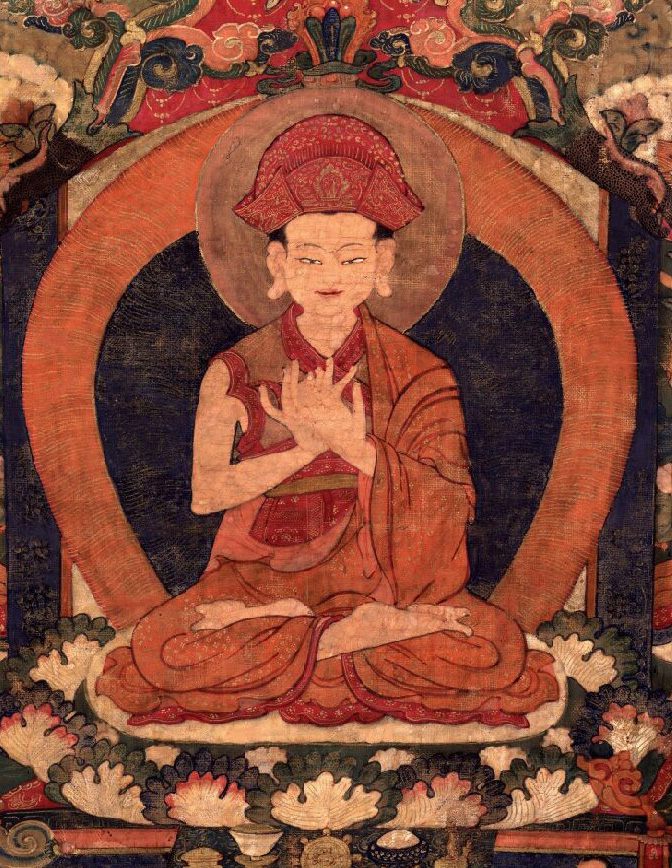

Personal life
- Born: 1143 Tsungu (tsu ngu), Kham
- Died: 1217 (aged 73–74)
- Resting place: "Body-Essence, Ornament of the World" stupa
- Other names: Jigten Gönpo; Welbar Tar (dbal 'bar thar); later changed to Tsunpa Kyab (btsun pa skyabs), and later on Dorje Pel (rdo rje dpal); Drikung Kyobpa Jikten Gönpo Rinchen Päl, Drikung Kyobpa Jikten Gönpo; Drikungpa Rinchen Pel; Kyobpa Jikten Gönpo; Rinchen Pel; Kyobpa Rinpoche (Wylie: 'bri gung skyob pa 'jig rten mgon po rin chen dpal), Bodhisattva Ratnashri

Religious life
- Religion: Tibetan Buddhism
- Temple: Densatil; Drigung Thil Monastery
- Lineage: Founder of the Drikung Kagyu
- Monastic name: Rinchen Pel

Senior posting
- Teacher: Phagmo Drupa Dorje Gyalpo (dpag mo gru pa rdo rje rgyal po), Tsilungpa (tsi lung pa), Lama Menyag (bla ma me nyag)
- Post: Drikung Monastery
- Successor: Gurawa Tsultrim Dorje (gu ra ba tshul khrims rdo rje)

Jigten Sumgön or Jigten Gönpo འཇིག་རྟེན་གསུམ་མགོན ("Lord of the Three Worlds", Skt: Trailokyanāthaḥ) (1143–1217) was the founder of the Drikung Kagyu lineage and main disciple of Phagmo Drupa. He founded Drikung Thil Monastery in 1179.

Jigten Sumgön and the Drikung lineage are best known for the set of teachings known as The Five Profound Paths of Mahāmudrā (phyag chen lnga ldan). Some of Jigten Sumgön's sayings were collected by Sherab Jungne into what is known as the Gongchig (Wylie transliteration: dgongs gcig, "the single intention"), a profound philosophical compendium that further developed in commentarial works written in following generations. Some of Jigten Sumgön's teachings were collected by another disciple into what is known as The Heart of the Great Vehicle's Teachings (theg chen bstan pa'i snying po).

== Life ==
The meaning of Jigten Sumgön ('jig rten gsum mgon) is "The Lord of the Triple World". Jigten Sumgön is known under various names: Drikung Kyobpa Jigten Gönpo Rinpoche, Drikung Kyobpa Jikten Gönpo Rinchen Päl, Lord Jigten Sumgön, Kyobpa Rinpoche, and many others.

Because his mother had a connection with the Bön tradition, upon his birth Jigten Sumgön was initially given a Bön name, Welbar Tar (dbal 'bar thar).

Jigten Gönpo's great-grandmother was Achi Chökyi Drölma, who prophesied his birth and vowed to protect his lineage. Jigten Sumgön was born in 1143 into a famous clan called the Kyura (skyu ra) in the Kham (khams) region of Tibet by the name of Tsungu (tsu ngu); his mother was Rakyisa Tsunma, and his father, Naljorpa Dorje, was a devout Vajrayāna practitioner (of Yamāntaka) who died when Jigten Sumgön was still a boy—at that time, Jigten Sumgön started to support his family by reciting scriptures. It is said that when he was only eight years old, he understood that all phenomena are like a reflection in a mirror.

Due to his fame, many great masters came to study and practice in Drikung Thil for many centuries after Lord Jigten Sumgön's passing into parinirvāṇa. Perhaps the most famous of these was Lama Tsongkhapa, the founder of the Gelug school of Tibetan Buddhism. While staying near Drikung Thil, Tsongkhapa received the Drikung teachings on the Six Yogas of Naropa, as well as all of the outer and inner texts by Jigten Sumgön. Many Gelugpas, including the fourteenth Dalai Lama, uphold Tsongkhapa's lineage of Naropa's yogas until today.

== Teaching ==
Lord Jigten Sumgön was one of the most notable masters of Tibetan Buddhism, and his teachings had wide-reaching influence for centuries to come; up to 130,000 monks and practitioners came to his teaching at one time.

=== The Single Intent ===
The most important idea associated with Jigten Sumgon is the "Single Intention", which is based on the idea that all of the Buddha's teachings have a single essence, a single meaning and a single intent. This single intent is generally identified with "nonarising" or "birthlessness" (skye ba med pa) in the context of sutra and "mahamudra" in the tantric context. This single intent is also identified with terms such as tathata and dharmata.

This is the central topic of a collection of 150 vajra statements which were collected into the influential text known by the name Single Intention (Gongchig, Wyl. Dgongs gcig). The first vajra statement encapsulates the main idea of the text: "All the teachings of the Buddha are the revelation of the original state of the fundamental nature (gshis babs)."

According to Jan-Ulrich Sobisch:

The Single Intention weaves the thread of ineffable mahamudra through the entire fabric of Buddhism. It presents mahamudra as pervading disciplined conduct, meditative concentration, and discriminative knowledge; ground, path, and result; view, practice, and conduct; and the “three vows” of pratimoksa, of the bodhisattvas, and of mantra. Jikten Sumgön teaches how the fundamental values and insights revealed by the Buddha are woven into reality and therefore accessible to all.

Even though there is only a single intention in the teachings of the Buddhas, due to the varying capacity of sentient beings, the single intent is expressed through limitless skillful means, through teachings on the ground, path and result and through the three vehicles. Even though there are these many numerous teachings, Jigten Sumgon holds that all of them have the common purpose of leading to supreme Buddhahood. He also holds that they were all taught for all beings (against the view that certain teachings were only taught for certain classes of beings, such as Hinayana teachings being only for those of the Hinayana family and so on). Thus the three turnings of the wheel of Dharma are essentially one, they contain each other and aim at the same goal, but different beings have different conceptions, and thus there appear to be three turnings.

The eighth Karmapa referred to Jigten Sumgön's Gongchig as "siddhānta of the Kagyupas", suggesting he considered it to be the definitive text outlining the philosophical tenets of all Kagyu schools. Seven centuries later, Dudjom Rinpoche quotes Jigten Sumgön on something else he emphasized, the significance of the preliminary practices (ngöndro): "Other teachings consider the main practice profound, but here it is the preliminary practices that we consider profound."

=== The usefulness of philosophy ===
Regarding Buddhist philosophical tenets, Jigten Sumgön and his followers generally held a dismissive attitude towards their usefulness. Jigten Sumgön states in Gongchig (4.13): "The truth is veiled by all [philosophical] tenets whatsoever." He also wrote:

May those who mistake the system of tenets, which is a knot of the mind, as the Buddha’s intention, realize true reality and may their mindfulness be purified in itself.

Moreover, echoing the mahāsiddha Saraha, he says:

All the views starting from the Non-Buddhists’ view of permanence and nihilism and up to the Madhyamikas’ [view] are something that is a mind-made duality. Since I have not studied these views of the various tenets, I do not know them.

Instead of establishing a specific philosophical view as unrefutable or attempting to conceptually express the truth intellectually, Jigten Sumgön held we should strive to attain direct realization of the nature of the mind.

== Bibliography ==
- Cuevas, Bryan J. (2006). The Hidden History of the Tibetan Book of the Dead. Oxford University Press US. ISBN 019530652X, ISBN 9780195306521
- Dorji, Sangay (Dasho); Kinga, Sonam (translator) (2008). The Biography of Zhabdrung Nga wang Namgyal: Pal Drukpa Rinpoche. Thimphu, Bhutan: KMT Publications. pp. 146–7. ISBN 9993622400.
- Gyaltsen, Khenpo Konchog (2006). The Great Kagyu Masters. Snow Lion Publications; 2nd edition. pp. 226–255. ISBN 1559392444
- Stewart, Jampa Mackenzie. The Life of Gampopa, Second Edition. Snow Lion Publications (July 25, 2004). ISBN 1559392142
