= Maizhokunggar County =

Maizhokunggar 墨竹工卡县 • མལ་གྲོ་གུང་དཀར་རྫོང་། Meldro Gungkar, Mozhugongka
- County
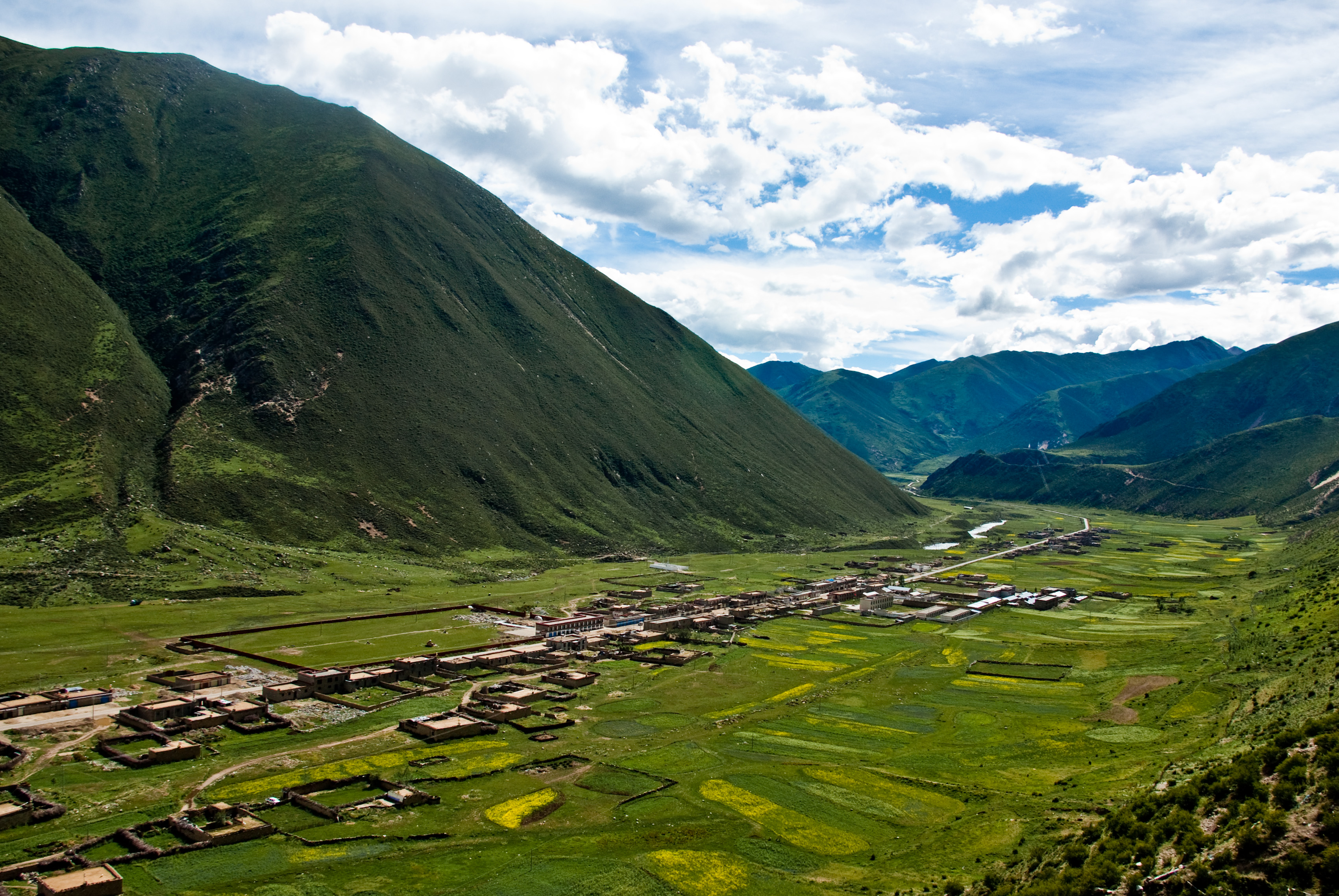
- View from Drigung monastery

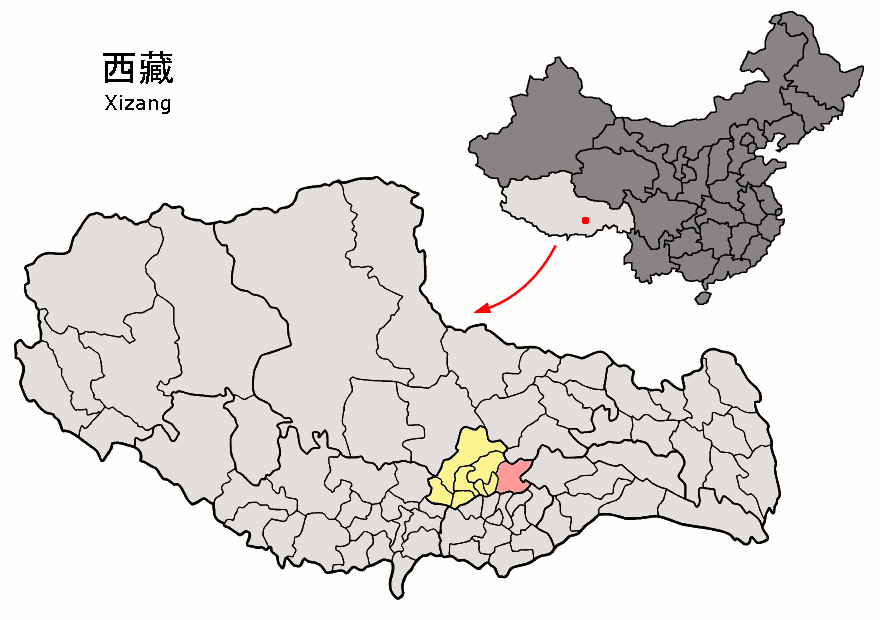
- Location of Maizhokunggar County (red) within Lhasa City (yellow) and Tibet Autonomous Region

- Location in Tibet Autonomous Region Maizhokunggar (China)
- Coordinates: 29.8393°N 91.7298°E
- Country: China
- Autonomous region: Tibet
- Prefecture-level city: Lhasa
- County seat: Kunggar

Area
  - Total: 5,492 km^{2} (2,120 sq mi)

Population (2020)
  - Total: 49,511
  - Density: 9.015/km^{2} (23.35/sq mi)
- Time zone: UTC+8 (China Standard)
- Website: www.xzmzgk.gov.cn

Maizhokunggar County

Chinese name
- Simplified Chinese: 墨竹工卡县
- Traditional Chinese: 墨竹工卡縣
Transcriptions
Standard Mandarin
- Hanyu Pinyin: Mòzhúgōngkǎ Xiàn

Tibetan name
- Tibetan: མལ་གྲོ་གུང་དཀར་རྫོང་།
Transcriptions
- Wylie: mal gro gung dkar rdzong
- Tibetan Pinyin: Maizhokunggar Zong

Maizhokunggar County or Meldro Gungkar County is a county of Lhasa and east of the main center of Chengguan, Tibet Autonomous Region. It has an area of 5,492 square kilometres (2,120 sq mi) with an average elevation of over 4,000 metres (13,000 ft). Most of the people are ethnic Tibetan and are engaged in agriculture or herding. Mining is a major source of tax revenue, but it has created environmental problems. The county has various tourist attractions including hot springs and the Drigung Monastery.

== Geography ==
Meldro Gungkar means "The Place where Nagaraja Meldro lived" in Tibetan. "Mozhugongka" means a town at the end of the earth. It is a twin city of Nanjing. The county is located on the middle and upper sections of the Lhasa River (or Kyi River) and the west of Mila Mountain. The Gyama Zhungchu, which runs through Gyama Township, is a tributary of the Lhasa River. Mila (or Mira) Mountain, at 5,018 metres (16,463 ft), forms the watershed between the Lhasa River and the Nyang River. The tree line on the north-facing slope of Mt. Mila is at 4,360 metres (14,300 ft). Sijin Latso is located here.

Mozhugongka is about 68 kilometres (42 mi) east of Lhasa. It has an area of 5,492 square kilometres (2,120 sq mi) with an average elevation of more than 4,000 metres (13,000 ft). Carboniferous sediments are found in the Lhunzub district of the Lhasa Terrane and to the south of Jang Co in the north of the terrane, but fossiliferous Lower Carboniferous has been found in the terrane only in the Maizokunggar district. The 600 metres (2,000 ft) stratum is mainly composed of alternating layers of quartose sandstone, slates and subordinate limestones that include the coral Kueichowphyllum sp.

== Climate ==
Mozhugongka County is in the semi-arid plateau temperate monsoon climate zone, with cold, dry and thin air, and high winds in winter and spring. The annual average temperature is 5.1 to 9.1 °C (41.2 to 48.4 °F). The highest temperature recorded was about 30 °C (86 °F) in June, but the average highest temperature is 14 to 16.1 °C (57.2 to 61.0 °F). The lowest temperature is −16 to −23 °C (3 to −9 °F) in January. There are about 90 frost-free days each year. Annual rainfall is 515.9 millimetres (20.31 in).

Climate data for Maizhokunggar, elevation 3,804 m (12,480 ft), (1991–2020 normals, extremes 1981–present)
Month	Jan	Feb	Mar	Apr	May	Jun	Jul	Aug	Sep	Oct	Nov	Dec	Year
Record high °C (°F)	19.5 (67.1)	19.8 (67.6)	24.8 (76.6)	25.1 (77.2)	27.1 (80.8)	28.5 (83.3)	28.6 (83.5)	26.3 (79.3)	26.2 (79.2)	23.6 (74.5)	21.5 (70.7)	16.2 (61.2)	28.6 (83.5)
Mean daily maximum °C (°F)	7.6 (45.7)	10.0 (50.0)	12.4 (54.3)	15.6 (60.1)	19.3 (66.7)	22.8 (73.0)	22.1 (71.8)	21.6 (70.9)	20.5 (68.9)	17.5 (63.5)	13.0 (55.4)	9.8 (49.6)	16.0 (60.8)
Daily mean °C (°F)	−2.3 (27.9)	0.7 (33.3)	3.9 (39.0)	7.3 (45.1)	11.4 (52.5)	15.1 (59.2)	14.7 (58.5)	13.9 (57.0)	12.5 (54.5)	8.3 (46.9)	2.5 (36.5)	−1.3 (29.7)	7.2 (45.0)
Mean daily minimum °C (°F)	−10.0 (14.0)	−7.1 (19.2)	−3.1 (26.4)	1.0 (33.8)	5.4 (41.7)	9.3 (48.7)	10.0 (50.0)	9.1 (48.4)	7.5 (45.5)	1.9 (35.4)	−4.8 (23.4)	−8.9 (16.0)	0.9 (33.5)
Record low °C (°F)	−20.9 (−5.6)	−21.5 (−6.7)	−13.9 (7.0)	−8.9 (16.0)	−5.3 (22.5)	0.7 (33.3)	0.0 (32.0)	0.6 (33.1)	−2.6 (27.3)	−7.5 (18.5)	−15.1 (4.8)	−23.1 (−9.6)	−23.1 (−9.6)
Average precipitation mm (inches)	2.3 (0.09)	2.7 (0.11)	10.1 (0.40)	18.8 (0.74)	44.8 (1.76)	113.4 (4.46)	157.6 (6.20)	136.2 (5.36)	85.9 (3.38)	10.8 (0.43)	2.2 (0.09)	1.4 (0.06)	586.2 (23.08)
Average precipitation days (≥ 0.1 mm)	1.2	2.0	4.9	8.6	11.8	17.0	21.5	20.0	16.1	4.5	1.1	0.6	109.3
Average snowy days	1.8	3.2	7.5	9.9	3.2	0.2	0	0	0.1	2.7	2.0	1.0	31.6
Average relative humidity (%)	28	27	33	42	48	56	67	69	65	48	35	30	46
Mean monthly sunshine hours	264.1	248.8	270.0	262.1	283.4	266.9	239.3	233.5	250.2	290.5	279.7	275.9	3,164.4
Percentage possible sunshine	69	81	78	72	67	67	64	56	58	69	83	88	87
Source: China Meteorological Administrationall-time Jul high

== Population ==
The total population as of 2010 was 48,561 people in 9,719 households, the great majority engaged in farming and herding. 98% of the population are ethnic Tibetan.

== Administrative divisions ==
Maizhokunggar County is divided into 1 town and 7 townships. From 1987 the seat of government has been in Kunggar in the west of the county.

Name	Tibetan	Wylie	Chinese	Pinyin
Town
Kunggar Town	གུང་དཀར་ཆོས་འཁོར།	gung dkar grong rdal	工卡镇	Gōngkǎ Zhèn
Gyama Town	རྒྱ་མ་ཤང་།	rgya ma shang	甲玛镇	Jiǎmǎ Xiāng
Townships
Zaxoi Township	རྩ་ཞོལ་ཤང་།	rtsa zhol shang	扎雪乡	Zhāxuě Xiāng
Mamba Township	རྨམ་པ་ཤང་།	rmam pa shang	门巴乡	Ménbā Xiāng
Zhaxigang Township	བཀྲ་ཤིས་སྒང་ཤང་།	bkra shis sgang shang	扎西岗乡	Zhāxīgǎng Xiāng
Rutog Township	རུ་ཐོག་ཤང་།	ru thog shang	日多乡	Rìduō Xiāng
Nyimajangra Township	ཉི་མ་ལྕང་རྭ་ཤང་།	nyi ma lcang rwa shang	尼玛江热乡	Nímǎjiāngrè Xiāng
Tanggya Township	ཐང་སྐྱ་ཤང་།	thang skyabs shang	唐加乡	Tángjiā Xiāng

== Economy ==
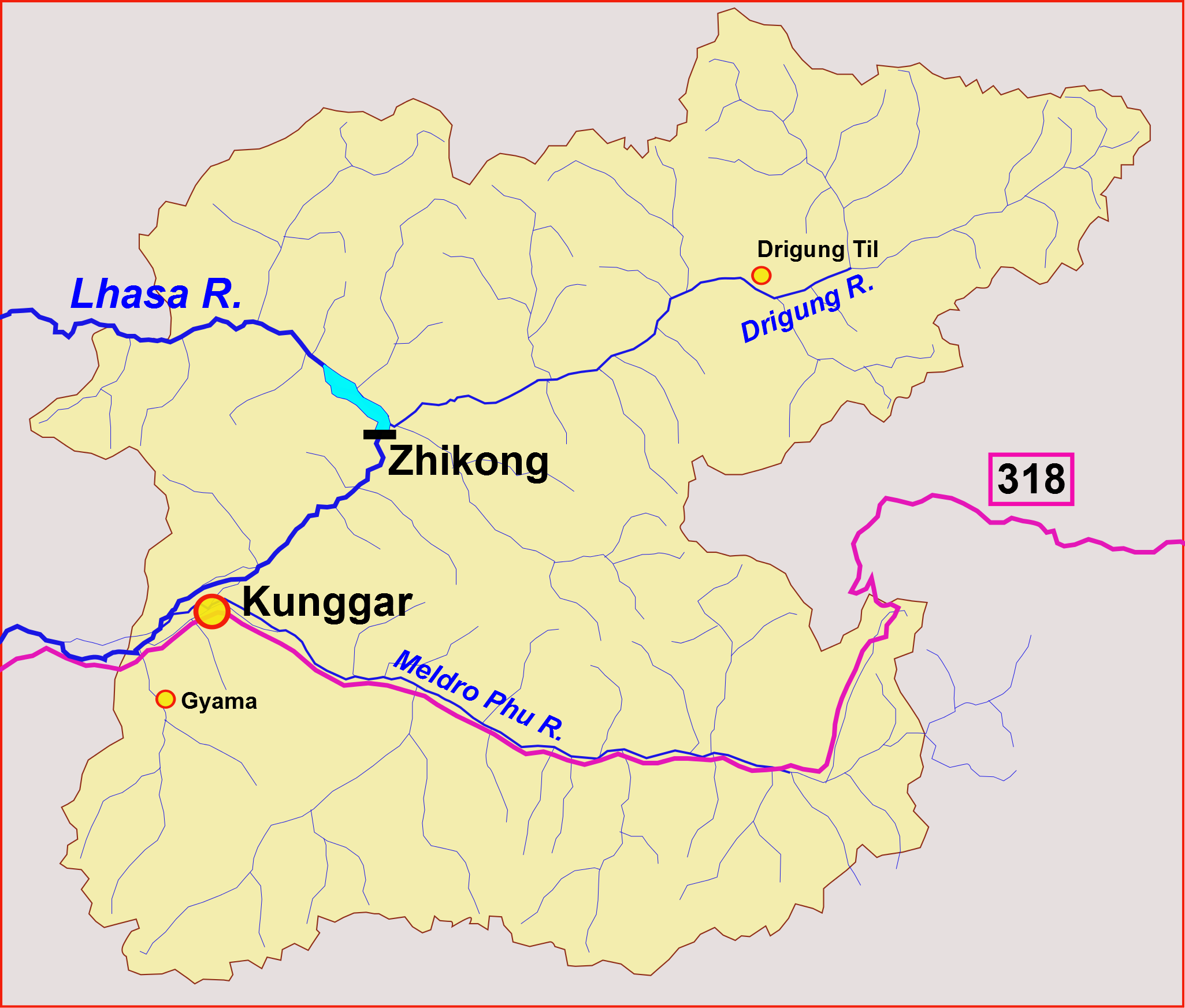
Sketch map showing rivers

Many of the people depend on agriculture, including farming and herding. Development efforts include increased farm animal husbandry, feedstock production, greenhouses for vegetables, and breeding programs. Crops include barley, winter wheat, spring wheat, canola, peas, cabbage, carrots, eggplant, cucumbers, lettuce, spinach, green peppers, pumpkins, potatoes and other greenhouse crops. In 2007 the county produced 23,189,100 kilograms (51,123,200 lb) of food products, and had 235,000 livestock excluding horses. Traditional folk handicrafts include pottery, willow basketwork, wooden objects, mats and gold and silver items. The county is especially noted for its pottery, which does not corrode, retains heat and has an ethnic style. It has a more-than-1000-year-old history.

China National Highway 318 runs through the county from east to west. The section in Mozhugongka County is 80 kilometres (50 mi) long. There are over 70 rural roads in the county, with a total length of 650 kilometres (400 mi). Television is available to 36% of the population and radio to 48%. There is one high school, 14 full primary schools and 74 village schools. Mozhugongka has been selected as a Cooperative Medical System experimental site, which has resulted in a very high percentage of people with health care coverage. Efforts are being made to improve telecommunications and the road system and to attract tourists.

Construction of the Zhikong Hydro Power Station in Maizhokunggar County began in May 2003. The reservoir is at an elevation of 12,660 feet (3,860 m) above sea level. The project cost 1.37 billion yuan. The dam impounds 225,000,000 cubic metres (7.9×10^{9} cu ft) of water. The 100 MW power station came into operation in September 2007. Another 26 small and medium-sized hydropower stations have a total installed capacity of 2,310 kilowatts.

The economy is driven by mineral extraction, which was expected to account for 73.85% of total tax revenue in 2007 while employing 419 people. Extensive mining in the mountainous regions between Gyama and Zibuk have turned areas of what was green pasturage into a grey wasteland. The authorities are reported to have suppressed protests by the local people.

The Gyama mine, located at 29°43′58.9″N 91°41′29.5″E at an elevation of 4,034 meters in the Gyama Valley, is operated by a subsidiary, Tibet Huatailong Mining Development, of a subsidiary, Vancouver based China Gold International Resources Corporation, of China National Gold Group Corporation. It produces gold, molybdenum, and copper. Mining by the state-owned firm replaced small private mines in the area in 2006. About $500 million was invested in construction of the mining facility between 2008 and 2010. The mine, which is upstream of Lhasa, presents water pollution issues and has a history of rocky relations with local residents, many of whom have been displaced and relocated. In March 2013 the 2013 Gyama Mine landslide which killed 83, mostly Han miners, resulted in international attention by the media.

== Landmarks ==
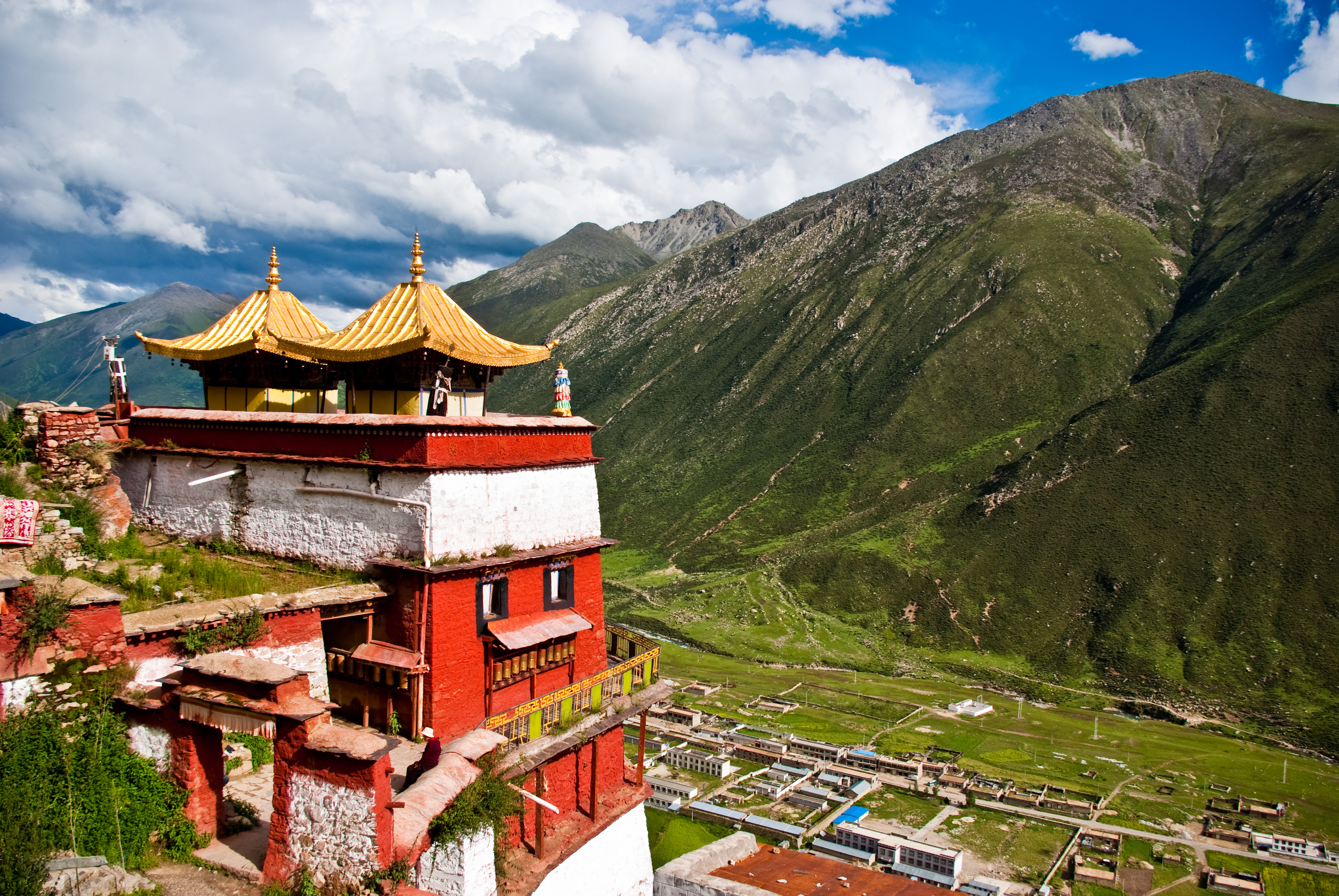
Drigung Monastery in the east of the county

Scenic spots include the Bri-gung (Drigung) Monastery and the Dezhong Hot Spring, as well as the nature reserves. The Drikhung Thil Monastery of the Kagyu Sect was founded in 1179 by Lingchen Repa, a disciple of Phagmo Drupa. The monastery is the home of the Drikhung Kagyu School of the Kagyu sect. The Dezhong Hot Spring has abundant supplies of water, and was historically thought to have magical curative powers. It is popular with both tourists and local people. There are 47 religious sites with 634 Buddhist monks and nuns as of 2010. The 29 monasteries consist of 11 of the Gelug sect, 16 of the Kagyu, 1 of the Nyingma and 1 of the Sakya. Jama wetland in Mozhugongka county is vulnerable to grazing and climate change.

The ruined Gyama Palace, in the Gyama Gully in the south of the county, was built by Namri Songtsen in the 6th century after he had gained control of the area from Supi. Songtsän Gampo, his son, was born in the palace. The traces of the mountainside palace indicate that it was an impressive complex. Three more recent white pagodas mark Songtsen Gampo's birthplace. Later the dynasty moved the capital of Tubo (Tibet) to Lhasa in 633 AD. Gyama was the site of fierce battles against the Mongolian Güshi Khan, who had been invited to Tibet by the Gelug sect. Beside the palace, there are ruins of various fortifications from the Yuan (1271–1368) and Ming (1368–1644) dynasties.

== Sources ==
- An, Caidan (2003). Tibet China: Travel Guide. 五洲传播出版社. ISBN 978-7-5085-0374-5.
- Bai, Wanqi; Shang, Erping; Zhang, Yili (2012). "Application of a New Method of Wetland Vulnerability Assessment to the Lhasa River Basin". Resources Science. 34 (9).
- Barboza, David (March 29, 2013). "China: Landslide Buries Workers at Mine in Tibet". The New York Times.
- Brown, Kerry (2013-08-13). "Mining Tibet, Poisoning China". China Digital Times.
- Buckley, Michael (2014-11-11). Meltdown in Tibet: China's Reckless Destruction of Ecosystems from the Highlands of Tibet to the Deltas of Asia. St. Martin's Press. ISBN 978-1-137-47472-8.
- "Ceramic skill, treasure of herdsmen in Maizhokunggar". China Tibet News. 2015-01-31. Archived from the original on 2015-02-09.
- "Hydroelectric Power Plants in China – Tibet". Platts UDI World Electric Power Plants Data Base. 2012-10-03.;
- Ling, Haicheng (2005). Buddhism in China. 五洲传播出版社. ISBN 978-7-5085-0840-5.
- "Mozhugongka County" (in Chinese). China Intercontinental Communication Center.
- "Mozhugongka county economic and social development highlights" (in Chinese). Tibet Autonomous Region People's Government. 2007-12-27. Archived from the original on 2015-02-09.
- "Mozhugongka County" (in Chinese). Mozhugongka County Information Office. 2014-12-19. Archived from the original on 2015-02-09.
- "Mozhugongka County Overview" (in Chinese). Lhasa Municipal Bureau of Industry and Information. Archived from the original on 2015-02-09.
- "Mozhugongka County". TibetOL (in Chinese).
- "Niyang River". Tibet Vista Travel.
- "Sanpower Group donated RMB300,000 to Mozhugongka County". Sanpower Group. 2011-09-02. Archived from the original on 2015-02-09.
- Shi, P.; Körner, C.; Hoch, G. (April 2008). "A Test of the Growth-Limitation Theory for Alpine Tree Line Formation in Evergreen and Deciduous Taxa of the Eastern Himalayas". Functional Ecology. 22 (2). British Ecological Society: 213–220. Bibcode:2008FuEco..22..213S. doi:10.1111/j.1365-2435.2007.01370.x. JSTOR 20142794.
- "Tibetans rebuked for protesting poisoning by Chinese mines". Tibetan Review. 2014-10-01.
- Wong, Edward (April 2, 2013). "Fatal Landslide Draws Attention to the Toll of Mining on Tibet". The New York Times.
- Yin, Jixiang; Xu, Juntao; Liu, Chengjie (1988-12-12). "The Tibetan Plateau: Regional Stratigraphic Context and Previous Work". Philosophical Transactions of the Royal Society of London. Series A, Mathematical and Physical Sciences. 327 (1594: The Geological Evolution of Tibet: Report of the 1985 Royal Society – Academia Sinica Geotraverse of Qinghai-Xizang Plateau). The Royal Society: 5–52. Bibcode:1988RSPTA.327....5J. doi:10.1098/rsta.1988.0121. JSTOR 38183. S2CID 122447938.
- Zheng, Peng (2007-09-24). "Lhasa River Zhi Kong hydroelectric power station put into operation". China Tibet Information Center. Archived from the original on 2015-02-06.
- Zhongwei, Zhao (September 2006). "Income Inequality, Unequal Health Care Access, and Mortality in China". Population and Development Review. 32 (3). Population Council: 461–483. doi:10.1111/j.1728-4457.2006.00133.x. JSTOR 20058900.
