= The Dance of 17 Lives =

2004 book by Mick Brown

The Dance of 17 Lives is a 2004 book by UK journalist and author Mick Brown. It is the story of an exiled Tibetan teenager, the Karmapa, who has been hailed as one of the greatest spiritual leaders of modern times.

== Karmapa controversy ==
Considerable controversy surrounded the enthronement of the 17th Karmapa, as there was not just one contender for the vacated throne, but two. Both contenders were represented by rival factions who wanted to get their candidate recognised as the true incarnation of the 16th Karmapa. The alternative to Urgyen Trinley Dorje was Thaye Dorje, who enjoyed the authoritative backing of Shamar Rinpoche.

While this book may not appeal to scholars of Tibetan culture, it does demystify this culture for a general readership. Brown shows how spiritual and secular power are closely related in the world of Tibetan Buddhism, with many monks and lamas vying for the power that comes from spiritual authority.

== See also ==
- Karmapa controversy
- Tibetan Buddhism

== Bibliography ==
- Brown, Mick. (2004). The Dance of 17 Lives: The Incredible True Story of Tibet's 17th Karmapa, Bloomsbury Press, ISBN 0-7475-7161-9
