= Diamond Way Buddhism =

Tibetan Buddhist lay organization

Diamond Way Buddhism – Karma Kagyu Lineage
- Abbreviation: Diamond Way
- Formation: 1972
- Founder: Ole Nydahl; Hannah Nydahl
- Type: Tibetan Buddhism; Western Buddhism
- Headquarters: Europe Center, Hochreute 1, 87509 Immenstadt, Germany
- Lama: Ole Nydahl
- Website: diamondway-buddhism.org

Diamond Way Buddhism (Diamond Way Buddhism – Karma Kagyu Lineage) is a lay organization within the Karma Kagyu school of Tibetan Buddhism. The first Diamond Way Buddhist center was founded in 1972 by Hannah Nydahl and Ole Nydahl in Copenhagen under the guidance of Rangjung Rigpe Dorje, 16th Karmapa. Today there are approximately 650 centers worldwide, directed by Ole Nydahl under the guidance of Trinley Thaye Dorje, one of two claimants to the title of the 17th Karmapa (See Karmapa Controversy). Buddhist teachers such as Sherab Gyaltsen Rinpoche, Lama Jigme Rinpoche and Nedo Kuchung Rinpoche visit Diamond Way Buddhism centers and large meditation courses.

== History and development ==
Following the Chinese invasion of Tibet, the head of the Karma Kagyu lineage, The 16th Karmapa, left Tibet in 1959, and established Rumtek monastery in Sikkim, India, as his main seat in exile. The exodus of Tibetans made Tibetan Buddhism more accessible to the rest of the world. Many young Westerners on the hippie trail from Europe to India and Nepal came into contact with Tibetan teachers. Beginning with Freda Bedi, in 1960, Westerners began taking refuge in Tibetan Buddhist masters. When Hannah Nydahl and Ole Nydahl were on their honeymoon in the Himalayas in 1968, they became students of Lopon Tsechu Rinpoche, and in 1969 took refuge with The 16th Karmapa and became his closest Western students. After meditating and studying Buddhism for three years, the 16th Karmapa asked Ole and Hannah to start meditation centers in his name in the West. The first Karma Kagyu center in the West was founded in 1972 in Copenhagen, Denmark.

In 1974 the 16th Karmapa visited Europe with the help of Ole and Hannah Nydahl. Following this visit and at the 16th Karmapa's request, Ole Nydahl began traveling further across Europe in order to teach the basic doctrines of Karma Kagyu Buddhism. As more became interested more centers were founded and their number increased over time, particularly in Germany and Poland. The individual groups grew steadily. He later traveled to the United States and across South America and Russia, founding more centers.

Following the Karmapa Controversy, Karma Kagyu Buddhist centers were obliged to decide whether to accept Orgyen Trinley Dorje, who was recognized by Tai Situ, the Dalai Lama and the Chinese government, or to support Shamar Rinpoche. In the course of the 1990s, while a majority of Kagyu monasteries elected to accept Orgyen Trinley Dorje, most Diamond Way centers under Ole Nydahl accepted Thaye Dorje.

Diamond Way Buddhism was founded as a legally distinct organization within the Karma Kagyu umbrella in 1993. Until then, the Nydahls had transferred all ownership of the centers they founded to the Karma Kagyu administration. However, it is common for Karma Kagyu lamas to each have their own organization for their students, as each teacher has a different style and approach. For example, Shamarpa has the Bodhipath organization, Chogyam Trungpa had the Vajradhatu, etc. The goals of the Diamond Way organization remain "the creation and maintenance of a permanent basis from which to enable both laypeople and achievers to maintain, cultivate and practice Buddhist religion, philosophy and culture in countries that are not originally Buddhist, within the traditional manner of the Diamond Way transmission of the Karma Kagyu lineage", Buddhist art, supporting translations of authentic Buddhist text, and funding retreats etc. The "spiritual counsel" of the organisation is provided by the 17th Karmapa Trinley Thaye Dorje (India), Kunzing Shamar Rinpoche (India) and Jigme Rinpoche (France).

== Ideals ==
Diamond Way describes itself as an adaptation of the Karma Kagyu tradition to Western culture without Tibetan customs and organisational structures.

Ole Nydahl describes Diamond Way as a lay tradition offering methods for people who have jobs, partners, families and responsibilities. He states "...our work is grown on the basis of friendship and trust... since the Diamond Way teachings aim to bring freedom and independence, it is people who already have those qualities who are generally attracted to our centers." He also says he is keen to avoid what were perceived to be the more exotic or ritualistic aspects of Tibetan Buddhism such as pujas sung in Tibetan with Tibetan musical accompaniment. In 1998 Ole Nydahl stated "I simply don’t want gifted and critical people who discover us to step right into the middle of a puja as has happened so often in the past. They then think they have landed with Catholics or some other sect and we won’t get a second chance to benefit them or their like-minded friends." Instead, most meditation texts (except mantras) are translated and used in European languages.

== Practices ==
The most important practice in Diamond Way Buddhism is considered to be identification with the teacher and following that to try to sustain the Mahamudra view and bring what is learned in meditation into daily life.

Diamond Way Buddhism uses a variety of standard Vajrayana meditation methods found within the Karma Kagyu tradition. When the practitioners meet at lectures or for meditation they will typically do the "Guru Yoga meditation", (Skt. Guru yoga, Tib. Lame Naljor) where the practitioner identifies with the enlightened qualities of the teacher in order to develop these qualities. This is then followed by the "Invocation of Black Coat", sung in Tibetan.

Like other Karma Kagyu practitioners, individuals then usually do a preliminary practice called the ngöndro, consisting of 111,111 repetitions each of 4 different meditations, as given by the 9th Karmapa. The ngöndro must be completed before practitioners can move on to other practices. In most cases, following completion of ngöndro, students practice a meditation on the Eighth Karmapa, Mikyö Dorje, called "The Guru Yoga in Four Sessions" (Tibetan Tun Shi Lame Naljor).

Other practices include a variant of the meditation on Chenrezig (Sanskrit Avalokiteśvara) composed by the 12th Century siddha Tang Tong Gyalpo and the phowa (transference of consciousness at the time of death).

They receive an explanation of the meditations from more experienced members who are authorized to teach in the Diamond Way Buddhist Centers.

== Locations ==
Diamond Way Buddhist temples are located in 65 different countries: Argentina, Australia, Austria, Belarus, Belgium, Brazil, Bulgaria, Canada, Chile, Colombia, Costa Rica, Crimea, Cuba, Czech Republic, Denmark, Ecuador, El Salvador, Estonia, Europe Center, Finland, France, Germany, Greece, Guatemala, Hong Kong, Hungary, Iceland, Ireland, Israel, Italy, Japan, Kazakhstan, Latvia, Lithuania, Malta, Mexico, Mongolia, Montenegro, Nepal, Netherlands, New Zealand, Norway, Panama, Peru, Poland, Portugal, Romania, Russia, Serbia, Singapore, Slovakia, Slovenia, South Africa, South Korea, Spain, Sweden, Switzerland, Taiwan, Thailand, Ukraine, United Kingdom, United States, Uruguay, Venezuela, and Vietnam.

== Teachers ==
=== The 16th Karmapa ===
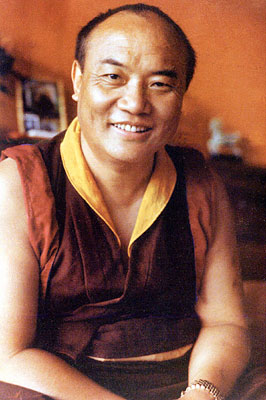
The 16th Karmapa Ranjung Rigpe Dorje

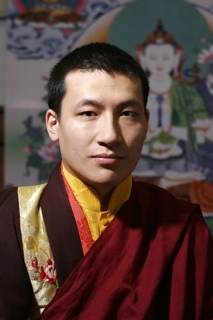
The 17th Karmapa Trinley Thaye Dorje

The 16th Karmapa Ranjung Rigpe Dorje (1924–1981) was born in Derge in eastern Tibet. Karmapa left the People's Republic of China in 1959, deciding that the Dharma would be served better outside Communist China. The Karmapas were the first incarnations to start the tulku-system and they are the heads of the Karma Kagyu lineage.

He was the Lama who told the Nydahls to start Karma Kagyu centres in the West and later visited many Karma Kagyu centres, mainly staying in centres founded by the Nydahls or Kalu Rinpoche. His first visit in the West was in 1974 and he gave numerous teachings and empowerments in the centres.

=== The 17th Karmapa ===
Trinley Thaye Dorje (born 1983) is the current head of the Karma Kagyu School and one of the candidates to the reincarnation of the 16th Karmapa. He is considered the true incarnation of the Karmapa by the Diamond Way Buddhist Centers, as well as by Shamarpa, Shangpa Rinpoche, the Second Beru Khyentse, Gyatrul Rinpoche, Nedo Rinpoche and Sherab Gyaltsen Rinpoche.

Trinley Thaye Dorje was born in Tibet but managed to escape in 1994 and was enthroned by Shamarpa at the Karmapa International Buddhist Institute (KIBI). He has since visited the West several times in order to teach. The first time he visited Europe was in 2000 and the first time he visited the United States was in 2003.

=== Ole Nydahl ===
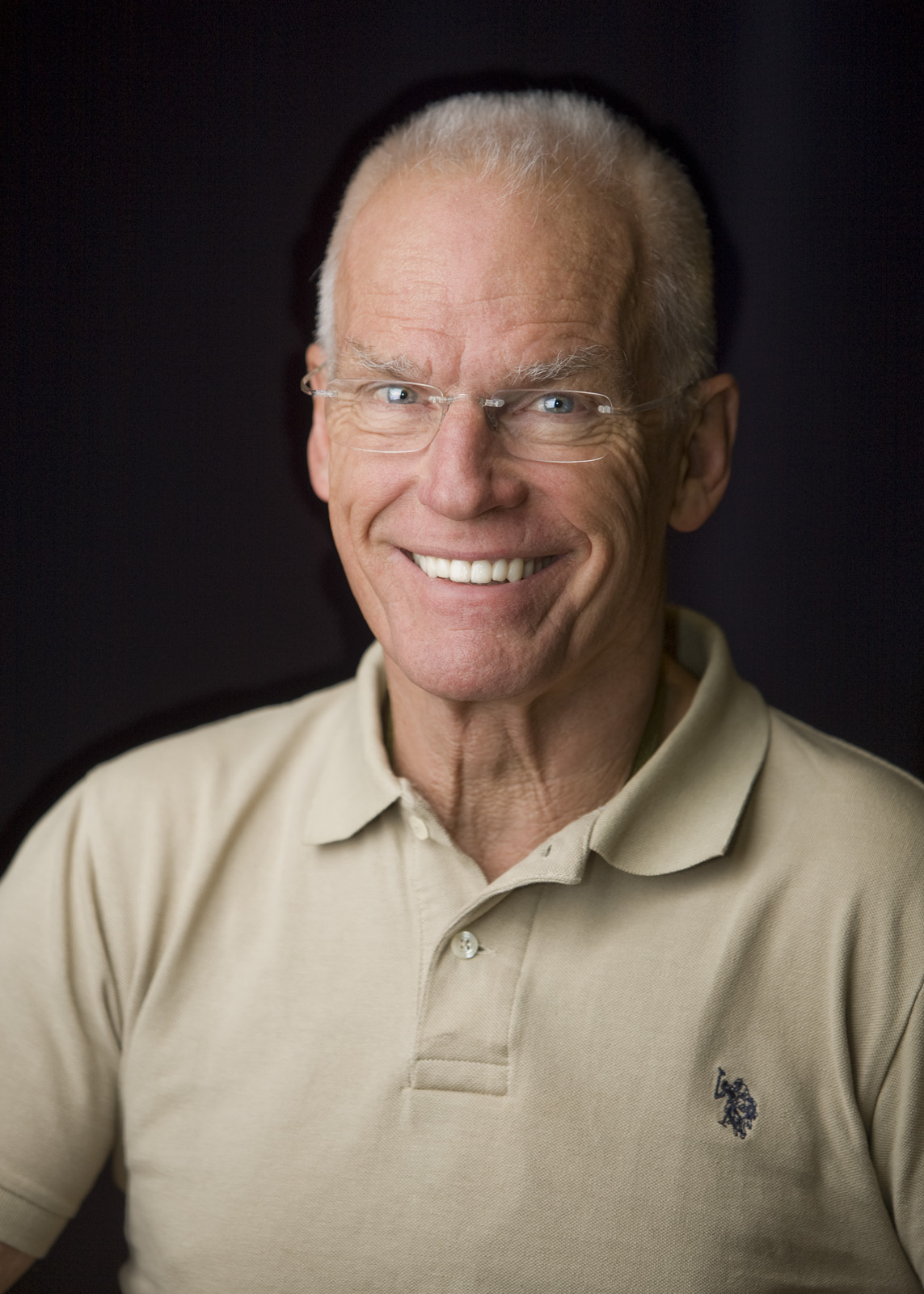
Lama Ole Nydahl in 2010

Ole Nydahl (born 1941 near Copenhagen, Denmark) is a Buddhist Lama and one of the main figures in the spreading of Karma Kagyu Buddhism in the West. Since the early 1970s he has toured the world, giving lectures and meditation courses, and together with his wife Hannah Nydahl (1946–2007) founded Diamond Way Buddhism. He is often referred to as Lama Ole Nydahl or Lama Ole.

=== Hannah Nydahl ===
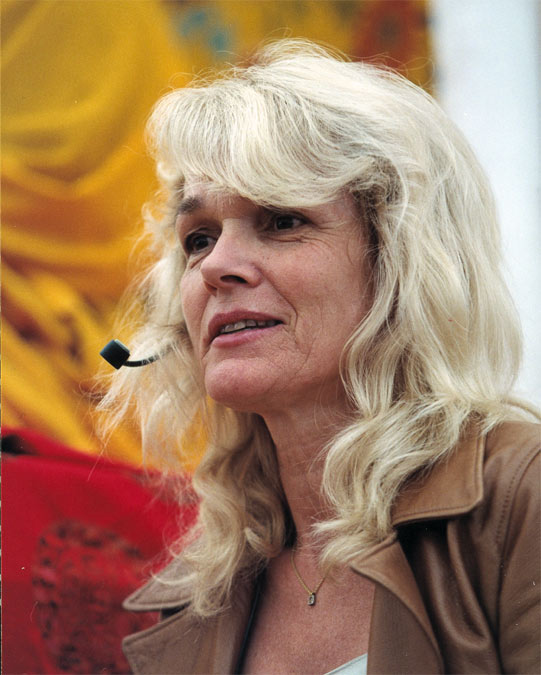
Hannah Nydahl

Hannah Nydahl (1946–2007), wife of Ole Nydahl, was an important Danish teacher and translator in the Karma Kagyu lineage of Tibetan Buddhism. She was born and died in Copenhagen, Denmark. Hannah and Ole Nydahl were introduced to Buddhism on their honeymoon in Nepal in 1968, where they became students in 1969. She was sometimes referred to as Lamini or female Lama, but the main role of Hannah Nydahl was as a translator, which she didn't mind.

=== Shamar Rinpoche ===
Kunzig Shamar Rinpoche, born 1952 in Derge, Tibet, is second to the Gyalwa Karmapa in the spiritual hierarchy of the Karma Kagyu School. He fled Tibet at the age of 9 with the 16th Karmapa. Shamarpa is also known as Red Hat Karmapa, and is, together with the 17th Karmapa, the current holder of the Karma Kagyu lineage. Shamarpa completed the Karmapa International Buddhist Institute (KIBI) in New Delhi, India, after the death of the 16th Karmapa. He has officially recognized Trinlay Thaye Dorje as the 17th Gyalwa Karmapa.

He is the founder of Bodhi Path, another Karma Kagyu Buddhist group.

=== Lopon Tsechu Rinpoche ===
Lopon Tsechu Rinpoche (1918–2003) was the first teacher of Hannah and Ole Nydahl. He was born in Bhutan, but left the country when he was 13 in order to study and practice Buddhism in Nepal. He met the 16th Karmapa in 1944 and the Karmapa became his most important teacher. He visited Europe for the first time in 1987 at the invitation of the Nydahls, who were his first Western students. He traveled extensively throughout Europe, the Americas, and Australia giving teachings and initiations. He completed 17 stupas (Buddhist monuments) in Europe and Asia, including two important stupas in Spain: A Kalachakra stupa and the Benalmádena Stupa, the biggest stupa outside Asia.

=== Sherab Gyaltsen Rinpoche ===
Maniwa Sherab Gyaltsen Rinpoche, born 1950 in Nepal. He was ordained in Rumtek by the 16th Karmapa. The title "Maniwa" is a title given to a master of the Chenrezig practice, who have accomplished a billion Om mani padme hum mantras.

=== Other lamas ===
Other teachers mentioned as teachers by DiamondWay-Buddhism.org:

- Jigme Rinpoche
- Shangpa Rinpoche
- Nedo Rinpoche

== See also ==
- Buddhism in Europe
- Buddhism in the West
- Buddhism in Denmark
- Buddhism in Poland
- Buddhism in the United States
