= Buddhism in Denmark =

Buddhism is a minority religion in Denmark with approximately 64,000 members (1.1%) in 2018.

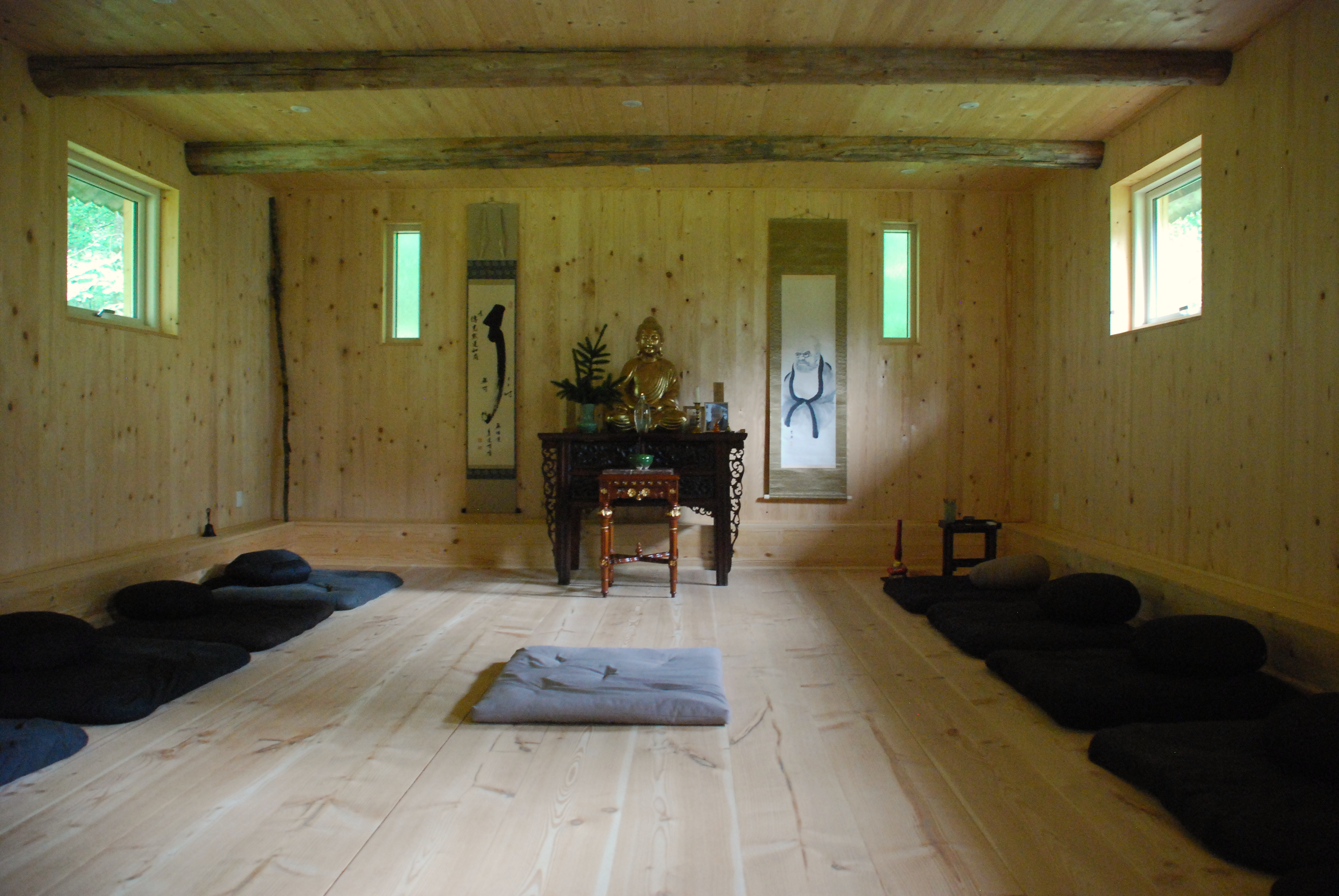
Havredal Zendo temple in Denmark

== History ==
In the 19th century, knowledge about Buddhism was brought back from expeditions that explored the Far East but interest was mainly from authors, Buddhologists and philologists. In 1921, Christian F. Melbye founded the first Buddhist Society in Denmark, but it was later dissolved in 1950 before his death in 1953. In the 1950s, there was a revival in interest towards Buddhism, especially Tibetan Buddhism. Hannah and Ole Nydahl founded the first Karma Kagyu Buddhist centers in Copenhagen. The third wave of Buddhism came in the 1980s, when refugees from Vietnam, Sri Lanka and China came to Denmark. Some Buddhist women, especially those from Thailand, came to Denmark seeking Danish husbands.

== Demographics ==
Accurate figures for the number of Buddhists in Denmark is not known, as it is illegal to record people's faiths in Denmark. However, according to Jørn Borup (Department of the Study of Religion, Aarhus University), there are approximately 30,000 Buddhists in Denmark today, of which 80% are Asian immigrants. Of these, 9,000 are from Vietnam and 10,000 are from Thailand. Despite Buddhism being a minority religion, the Dalai Lama is the Danes' preferred religious role model.

According to the latest Eurobarometer estimates, as of December 2018, 1.1% of Danish people are Buddhists. After Christianity and non-religious, Buddhism is the third largest religion in Denmark.

== Schools ==
There are 43 Buddhist groups in Denmark, 15 of which have official status as 'recognized congregations'. While the number of members and users of the groups are typically small, the 'convert groups' mainly oriented towards Tibetan and Zen Buddhism outnumber the few Asian Buddhist groups, whose number of 'adherents' nevertheless are much higher.

=== Theravada ===
Theravada Buddhism in Denmark is practised primarily by Thais and Sri Lankans and between 90 and 95% of the 10,000 Danish Thais are Buddhists. Thai Buddhist temples include the Watpa (Thai Language = วัดป่าโคเปนฮาเกน) in Copenhagen, Wat Thai Denmark Brahmavihara Buddhist Monastery (Thai Language = วัดไทยเดนมาร์กพรหมวิหาร) and the Wat Phra Dhammakaya Denmark (Thai Language = วัดพระธรรมกายเดนมาร์ก). These Buddhist émigrés seem almost invisible in Denmark, partly because Buddhism is generally not an evangelical religion, and they rarely take part in the larger social debate, partly because they have low unemployment and crime rates and are therefore not particularly newsworthy subjects for the media. Especially the Vietnamese have attracted such positive views which might be related to their generally positive, cultural integration. Although not directly related to Buddhism as a practiced religion, Buddhism's contribution to popular culture, media and marketing should not be underestimated.

=== Vajrayana ===
The first Tibetan Buddhist group was founded in Denmark by Hannah and Ole Nydahl. It belongs to the Karma Kagyu lineage, one of the major Tibetan schools. The very first center was opened in Copenhagen in 1972 and relocated in 1975 to its current location. To this day Diamond Way Buddhism has increased to nearly 600 centers worldwide. Although members of this group has not been growing for the last ten years, it is still the largest Vajrayana school in Denmark, with 500 Danish affiliates.

=== Soka Gakkai International ===
The Soka Gakkai International (SGI-DK) organization was established in Denmark in 1983 and had approximately 1,100 members in 75 local groups in 2015.

=== Zen ===
Zen is amongst the smallest schools of Buddhism in Denmark. It has five groups (both Soto and Rinzai) and no more than 100 practitioners.

=== Attempts at unity ===
In 1991, the Tibetan-born Lakha Lama tried to establish a trans-sectarian Buddhist umbrella organization called the Buddhist Forum and since 1993 it has been a member of the European Buddhist Union despite having only two hundred paying members. Another Lakha Lama project called Phendeling has subsequently taken over its role and now includes some non-Vajrayana Buddhist groups. Two groups, the Diamond Way Buddhism and Soka Gakkai International, have reportedly not been invited to join the umbrella organizations. In the early 1990s, there was a split between Ole Nydahl and the rest of the groups during the Karmapa controversy. One of two candidates was about to be chosen as the one new reincarnation of the 16th Karmapa. Ole Nydahl supported Trinley Thaye Dorje whilst Urgyen Trinley Dorje was supported by most other Buddhist groups and the Dalai Lama.

== Visits by the Dalai Lama ==
The exiled Tibetan leader, the Dalai Lama has visited Denmark several times. He first visited in 1973 to help inaugurate the first Karma Kagyu center founded by the Nydahls. He came back in 1996 for an official visit, but was not met by the Danish prime minister at that time, Poul Nyrup Rasmussen, who said that he was too busy, which he said again the next time the Dalai Lama visited in 2000. However, he did meet him at the airport just before he left.

In 2003, the Dalai Lama returned and was officially welcomed by Rasmussen's successor, Anders Fogh Rasmussen, with the backing of the entire government, despite protests from China.

== Notable Danish Buddhists ==
- Hannah Nydahl
- Ole Nydahl
- Anne Louise Hassing
- Tom McEwan

== Bibliography ==
- Borup, Jørn (2005). Dansk dharma. Buddhisme og buddhister i Danmark. Højbjerg: Forlaget Univers.
- Borup, Jørn (2008). Buddhism in Denmark, Journal of Global Buddhism 9, 27-37
- Borup, Jørn (2016) "Who are these Buddhists and How Many of Them are There?: Theoretical and Methodological Challenges in Counting Immigrant Buddhists: A Danish Case Study", in Journal of Contemporary Religion 31, 1: 85-100.
- Borup, Jørn and Lars Ahlin (2011) "Religion and cultural integration. Vietnamese Catholics and Buddhists in Denmark" in Nordic Journal of Migration Research 1, 3.
- Borup, Jørn (2016). Branding Buddha – Mediatized and Commodified Buddhism as Cultural Narrative, Journal of Global Buddhism 17: 41-55
