= Mipham Chokyi Lodro =

14th Shamarpa of the Karma Kagyu lineage

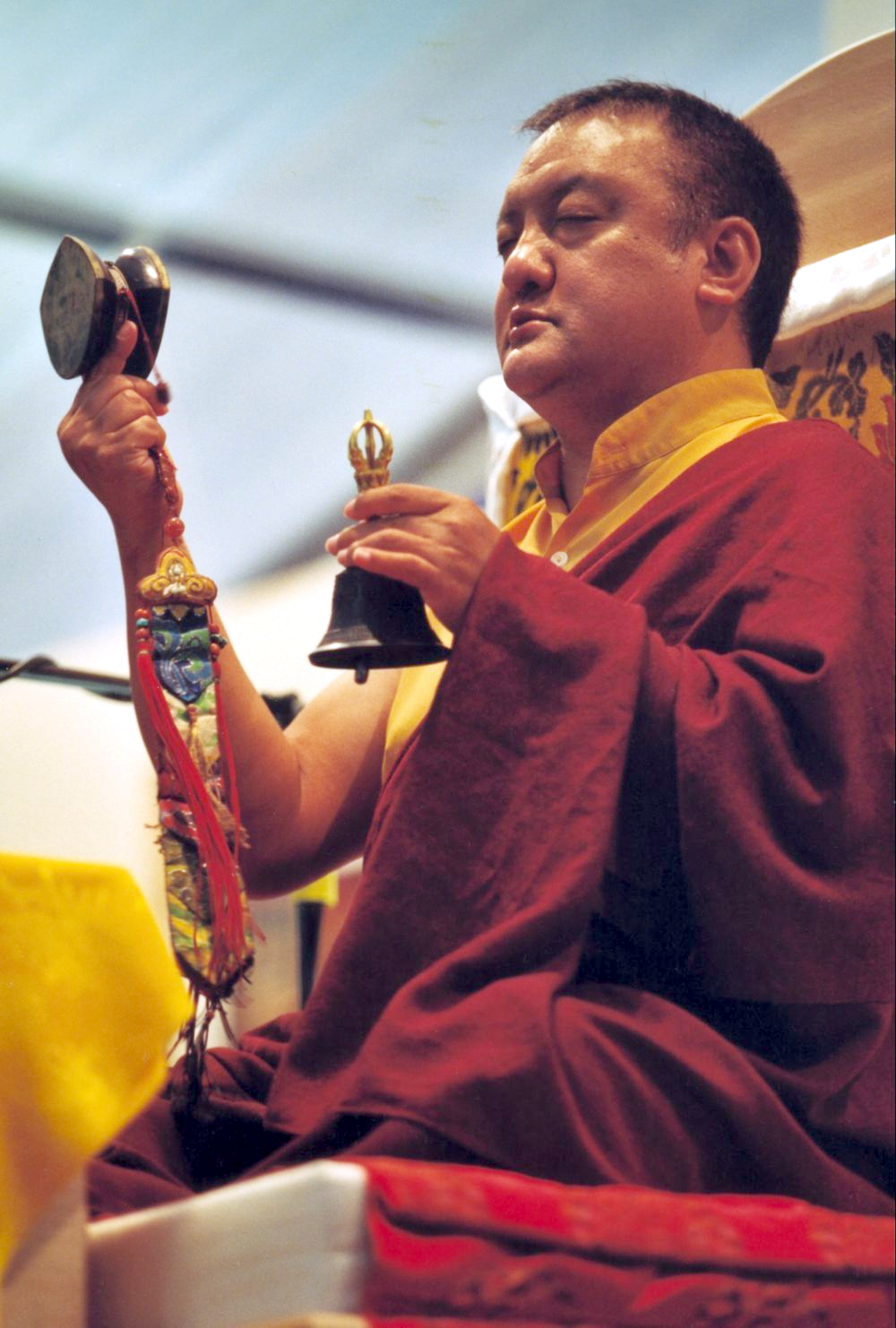
- Title: Shamarpa, Lama, Rinpoche

Personal life
- Born: October 27, 1952; Derge, Tibet
- Died: June 11, 2014 (aged 61); Renchen, Germany

Religious life
- Religion: Buddhism
- School: Vajrayana
- Lineage: Karma Kagyu

- Mipham Chokyi Lodro

Tibetan name
- Tibetan: མི་ཕམ་ཆོས་ཀྱི་བློ་གྲོས་་
Transcriptions
- Wylie: Mi-pham Chos-kyi Blo-gros

Chinese name
- Traditional Chinese: 米龐確吉羅佐
- Simplified Chinese: 米庞确吉罗佐
Transcriptions
Standard Mandarin
- Hanyu Pinyin: Mǐpáng Quèjí Luōzuǒ

Mipham Chokyi Lodro (27 October 1952 – 11 June 2014), also known as Kunzig Shamar Rinpoche, was the fourteenth Shamarpa of the Karma Kagyu school of Tibetan Buddhism. The Shamarpa is the second-most important teacher of the Karma Kagyu school, after the Karmapa.

The Karmapas are sometimes referred to as the Black Hat Lamas, referring to their distinctive, black crown. Karma Pakshi, the second Karmapa, prophesied that "future Karmapas shall manifest in two nirmāṇakāya forms." Later, the third Karmapa, Rangjung Dorje, presented to his principal student, Khedrup Drakpa Senge, a ruby-red crown (Standard Tibetan: ཞྭ་དམར།, Tibetan: [ɕàmáː], Wylie: zhwa dmar, 'red hat') that was—apart from its color—an exact replica of his own crown; the Karmapa explained that the red crown symbolised their identical nature, and so the lineage of the Shamarpas began. The fourteenth Shamarpa was recognised by the sixteenth Karmapa, Rangjung Rigpe Dorje.

== Early life ==
In 1956, Shamar Rinpoche and his brother, Lama Jigme Rinpoche, went to Tsurphu, the seat of the Karmapas in Lhasa. The four-year-old Shamarpa showed special abilities, including recognizing a few monks from a previous life at Yangpachen monastery. In light of these special signs, the sixteenth Karmapa asked the fourteenth Dalai Lama to revoke the prohibition of the Sharmapa incarnations. Consent was given, and a private enthronement of Shamar Rinpoche took place in 1958. His formal education took place at Rumtek, and he received transmissions and initiations from the Karmapa and other Kagyu and Nyingma masters. In 1964, the Tibetan Government-in-Exile formally lifted the one-hundred-seventy-year ban on the Shamarpa institution, and Shamar Rinpoche was officially enthroned. After completing his studies in 1979, the Shamarpa began his extensive teaching activity.

== Activity ==
In the 1980s, the fourteenth Shamar Rinpoche established an education center for Tibetan exiles in Rumtek, the Nalanda Institute. He also founded an education center in Kalimpong, and a retreat center in Parphing. He also oversaw the construction of the Karmapa International Buddhist Institute (KIBI), and personally ran the institute in its first years. Shamar Rinpoche took over the project—conceived by Lopön Tsechu Rinpoche—of building the tallest stūpa in Europe; constructed in Benalmadena, Spain, in cooperation with the local government, it is thirty-three metres tall, and was inaugurated in 2003, with Lama Ole Nydahl, representatives of the Bhutanese Royal Family and government, and local Spanish authorities in attendance.

The Shamarpa looked after eight hundred traditional monasteries throughout Tibet and the Himalayas; in the West, the Shamarpa founded a retreat center in Virginia in 1996, as well as other Bodhi Path centers, nonsectarian and secular meditation groups.

Shamar Rinpoche wrote a book about reforming government corruption, and cared deeply about animals. In the book, he proposes a government structure in which decentralized power moves from small, democratic village units up to state and federal structures, where lawmakers protect the natural environment, humans and animals alike. He also founded the Infinite Compassion Foundation with the purpose of promoting the humane treatment of animals raised for consumption of meat and other products.

== Karmapa controversy ==
In the latter part of his life, the Shamarpa was a central figure in the ongoing Karmapa controversy within the Karma Kagyu lineage; he recognised Trinley Thaye Dorje as the current (seventeenth) Karmapa, as opposed to Ogyen Trinley Dorje.

== Death ==
After having completed several days of teachings at Renchen in Baden-Württemberg, the fourteenth Shamarpa died, due to a sudden heart attack, on the morning of 11 June 2014, at the age of sixty-one. "All beings, even the Buddha himself, must pass", he told his followers just before his death. The government of Nepal granted a "no objection" letter to perform the traditional cremation of Rinpoche’s body at the new Shar Minub monastery in Kathmandu, but the government then reversed its decision. As a result of not being allowed into Nepal, the body was greeted by tens of thousands of people, first in Renchen-Ulm, Germany (where the majority were Diamond Way students), then in New Delhi and Kalimpong, India, and finally at the Royal Palace in Bhutan, where Shamar Rinpoche had a close relationship with the royal family. The Nepalese government reversed its decision again, and the cremation took place in Kathmandu.

Relics of Shamar Rinpoche were placed in stūpas at Dhagpo Kagyu Ling in France, and at Renchen-Ulm in Germany. Other reliquaries are found in Natural Bridge, Virginia; KIBI, New Delhi; as well as at Shar Minub Institute in Nepal.

== Bibliography ==
Most popular English titles:

- Creating a Transparent Democracy: A New Model. Bird of Paradise Press (2006). ISBN 978-0996505918.
- The Path to Awakening: How Buddhism’s Seven Points of Mind Training Can Lead You to a Life of Enlightenment and Happiness. Delphinium Books (2014). ISBN 978-1883285593.
- A Golden Swan in Turbulent Waters: The Life and Times of the Tenth Karmapa Chöying Dorje. Bird of Paradise Press (2012). ISBN 978-09881762019782360170258
- Boundless Awakening: The Heart of Buddhist Meditation. Bird of Paradise Press (2013). ISBN 978-0988176218.

== Notes ==
Religious titles
Preceded by Tinlay Kunchap	14th Shamarpa; 1952 – 2014	Vacant
