= Ole Nydahl =

Danish teacher in Tibetan Buddhism (1941–2026)

Lama Ole Nydahl
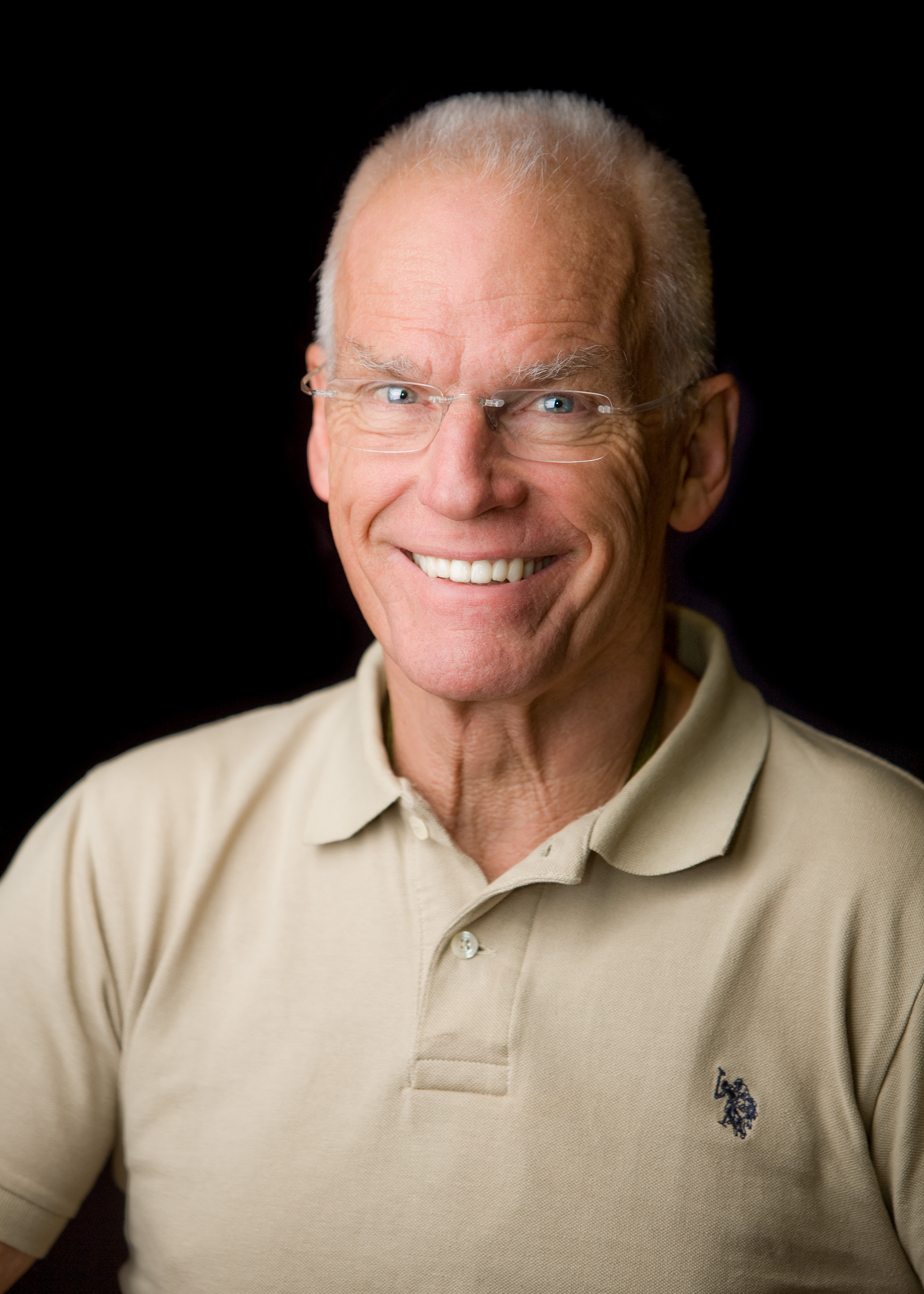
- Nydahl 2010
- Born: 19 March 1941; Copenhagen, Denmark
- Died: 18 May 2026 (aged 85); Immenstadt im Allgäu, Bavaria, Germany
- Organization: Diamond Way Buddhism
- Title: Lama
- Spouses: Hannah Nydahl (m. 1968; died 2007) Alexandra Munoz Barboza (m. 2014; div. 2017) Anne Behrend (m. 2019)
- Partner(s): Caty Hartung (1990-2004)
- Children: 3
- Website: lama-ole-nydahl.org

Ole Nydahl (19 March 1941 – 18 May 2026), also known as Lama Ole, was a lama providing Mahamudra teachings in the Karma Kagyu school of Tibetan Buddhism. From the early 1970s, Nydahl toured the world giving lectures and meditation courses. With his wife, Hannah Nydahl (1946-2007), he founded Diamond Way Buddhism, a worldwide Karma Kagyu Buddhist organization with over 600 centers for lay practitioners.

Nydahl was the author of more than 20 books (in German and English) about Diamond Way Vajrayana Buddhism, with translations into multiple languages. Titles include The Great Seal: Mahamudra View of Diamond Way Buddhism,The Way Things Are, Entering the Diamond Way, Buddha and Love and Fearless Death.

== Early life and education ==
Ole Nydahl was born north of Copenhagen into an academic family. Growing up in Denmark during the second world war, Nydahl witnessed his parents working in the Danish resistance movement, helping transport Jews to neutral Sweden. In the early 1960s, he served briefly in the Danish Army, then studied philosophy, English, and German at the University of Copenhagen, where he completed the examen philosophicum with the best possible grade. He began but did not finish a doctoral thesis on Aldous Huxley's The Doors of Perception. As a young man, Nydahl was involved in boxing, motorcycles, race car driving and also travelled overland from Denmark to Nepal several times. As described in his autobiography Entering the Diamond Way, his travels were financed through smuggling, for which he was once arrested and detained in Denmark. He used this time in pre-trial detention for meditation and read "Tibetan Yoga and Secret Doctrine" by Walter Evans-Wentz.

== Involvement with Buddhism ==
=== Buddhist education ===
In 1968, Ole Nydahl and his wife Hannah travelled to Nepal on their honeymoon. In Nepal they met their first Buddhist teacher, the Drukpa Kagyu master Lopon Tsechu Rinpoche. In December 1969, the Nydahls met Rangjung Rigpe Dorje, the 16th Karmapa, head of the Karma Kagyu lineage. Nine years after the British woman Freda Bedi became the first Western student of the 16th Karmapa, the Nydahls took refuge and became students of the Karmapa. They studied and meditated in the Himalayas, where they completed the Ngöndro or preliminary practices in six months, and had explanations and empowerments for 8th Karmapa guru yoga meditation practice and other methods. During this time the Nydahls also became students of Mipham Chokyi Lodro, the fourteenth Shamarpa, the 3rd Jamgon Kongtrul, and Kalu Rinpoche in Sonada. From the Karmapa, the Nydahls learned about Vajrayana Buddhism and mahamudra, and received the Kagyu Ngagdzo transmission. From the Shamarpa, they took the Bodhisattva vows and learned about Gampopa's Jewel Ornament of Liberation. They learned phowa from Ayang Rinpoche in 1972. In addition, the Nydahls received teachings and empowerments from various Tibetan lamas, including Dilgo Khyentse, Bokar Rinpoche, Gyaltrul Rinpoche and the Dalai Lama.

=== Teaching ===
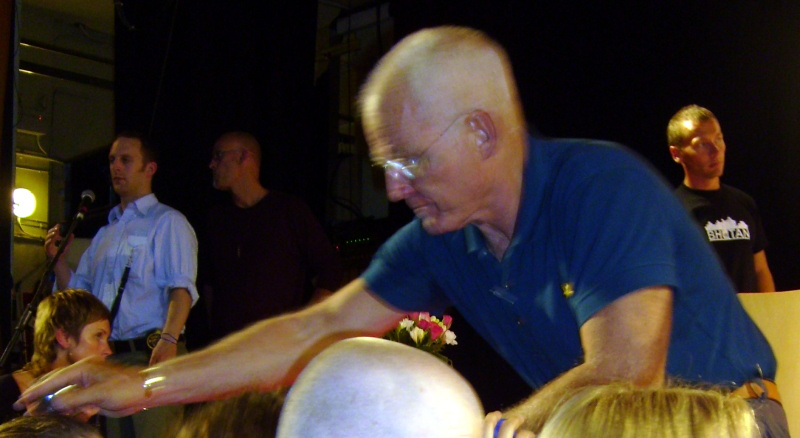
Nydahl in 2007

Upon returning to Europe in 1972, the 16th Karmapa asked Hannah and Ole Nydahl to begin teaching Buddhism and organize meditation centers, first in their native Denmark, then in Germany and other countries. The centers belong to the Karma Kagyu lineage and operate under Ole Nydahl's practical guidance. In the early 90s, Diamond Way Buddhism was founded as a way to protect established centers during the Karmapa controversy.

As of 2019, there were 635 Diamond Way centers throughout the world. Most are in Europe, Russia, or the United States.

Ole Nydahl regularly traveled between them during the year giving lectures and meditation courses. Until 2013, Nydahl taught conscious dying or phowa, as well as other Buddhist meditation practices, but more recently he has been focused on giving Mahamudra; teachings on the nature of mind. He traveled almost constantly for over 40 years, teaching in a new city nearly every day, until 2017 when his health necessitated reducing his travel schedule.

Together with his students, Nydahl has created Buddhist centers that provide access to Vajrayana meditation methods without requiring an understanding of Tibetan language or culture. In the Diamond Way centers, the meditations and names of the various Buddha forms have been translated into Western languages. Ole Nydahl believed it essential for people to understand and read the meditations in their own language in order for Buddhism to become truly rooted in the West, as noted in the preface to the meditation booklet titled Refuge and the Enlightened Attitude, used in Diamond Way Buddhist Centers, in which Nydahl states, "This practice used to have an exotic edge because the repetition was in Tibetan. It has now been brought into a Western context, enabling us to understand it on a much deeper level."

Diamond Way centers are run entirely by volunteers; the organization does not maintain any paid staff. The organizational structure is intended to be democratic and to function on the basis of idealism and friendship. According to Buddhism Today, the Diamond Way Buddhist magazine, "hierarchical systems will not sell with independent people in the West. Nobody wants a distant teacher on a pedestal or a big organization standing on their shoulders and telling them what to think."

Students in Diamond Way Centers practice the Ngöndro given by Wangchuk Dorje, 9th Karmapa Lama, which are a set of four foundational practices that are intended to prepare the mind for enlightenment, and several forms of guru yoga or meditation on the lama, such as the 16th Karmapa meditation, and the 8th Karmapa meditation (as given by the 16th Karmapa). In a newsletter dated 9 July 2010, Nydahl responded to questions about the types of practices taught in Diamond Way Centers by stating "I never taught anything I was not asked to pass on by the great Sixteenth Karmapa and that its basis was always the Guru Yogas of the Karmapas. Nothing else is practiced in our now 650 Diamond Way centers world-wide where my students meditate side by side." According to Bee Scherer, "This trajectory is a deliberate yet restrictive selection from the vast richness of Kagyu practices", providing an introductory course into Karma Kagyu practices.

== Influence ==
Jørn Borup, a professor of religion at Aarhus University, says that Ole Nydahl is "the most lasting influence on the Buddhist practice scene in Denmark" and "has in many ways been the icon of living Buddhism in Denmark". The total number of Nydahl's adherents is unknown, but can be estimated conservatively to include 15,000 to 70,000 students and casual sympathizers worldwide. In Germany alone, the German Buddhist Union, (Deutsche Buddhistische Union) estimates that about 20,000 persons regularly visit the Diamond Way centers and groups.

The 14th Shamar Rinpoche, Shamarpa, stated in his biography of the 16th Karmapa that "it was Lama Ole who made the Karmapa's name be renowned and through this, he established some 600 dharma centers," noting that Nydahl's work "is also the result of Gyalwa Karmapa's activity."

As well as co-founder of Diamond Way with his wife Hannah Nydahl, Ole Nydahl was co-founder and chairman of the board of The Diamond Way Buddhism Foundation. A non-profit international foundation under German law, it supports projects worldwide, such as a library in Karma Guen (Malaga, Spain), which translates and preserves Buddhist texts; organizes cultural events such as Tibetan art exhibitions; and is responsible for building retreat centers and stupas in Europe and Russia.

== Controversy ==
=== Lama and lay siddhi-yogi ===
In 1972, in a letter to Queen Margarethe of Denmark, the 16th Karmapa called Ole and Hannah Nydahl "trusted pupils", entrusting them to establish "a Centre and meditation centre" in Denmark. According to Bee Scherer, a professor of gender studies and religious studies at Canterbury Christ Church University, "Nydahl was not sent back in 1972 already as a "lama" in the sense of a traditionally trained and fully qualified Buddhist teacher." (Note: The 16th Karmapa later authorised them "to continue to be instructors to the people who are first entering into the understanding and practice of the Buddha Dharma," according to Scherer a qualification not equal to "qualified lama," since the Karmapa in a document from 1979 states that he appoints Ole and Hannah Nydahl as "teachers of the fundamentals [of Buddhism]," empowering them "to give refuge and the bodhisattva vows in the absence of qualified lamas.") (Note: According to Borup, Nydahl received the title of Lama from the Sixteenth Karmapa of the Kagyu lineage, before he established, in 1972, the Buddhist Centre Copenhagen: "After he had been given the title of lama by the Sixteenth Karmapa of the Kagyu lineage, he established together with Hannah Nydahl (died 2007) the Buddhist Centre Copenhagen in 1972.") According to Scherer, Nydahl "gained recognition as a Lama (bla ma, traditionally acknowledged teacher)" in the period after the death of the Sixteenth Karmapa in 1981. In August 1983, he was "finally acknowledged as a "Buddhist Master" by the lineage holder Shamar Rinpoche", the 14th Shamarpa, who certified that Nydahl is "appointed Buddhist Master". Scherer notes that since 1995 "the usage of "Lama" by higher Lamas in reference to Nydahl has been documented." (Note: In 1995, Khenpo Chödrak Thenpel stated that Nydahl is a "qualified teacher or Lama in the Tibetan language," further stating that "we hereby recognize Ole Nydahl as a qualified Buddhist layman-teacher, as a Lama." In response to criticism on the internet, Kunzig Shamar Rinpoche, the 14th Shamarpa, reiterated in 2006 that "it is [...] absolutely appropriate for Lama Ole Nydahl to hold the title of Lama," noting that "lama means Buddhist teacher is [sic] Tibetan Buddhism," and can be applied to both monks and lay persons who "teach Buddhism to their students.") (Note: Scherer calls Nydahl an "introductory Tibetan Buddhist teacher," quoting a "high Karma Kagyu master" who "called the Diamond Way a Buddhist ‘primary school, from which you can graduate to more substantial teachings’.")

Nydahl's "self-identification and legitimization as a Western Karma bKa' brgyud lay teacher" is an important part of a "continual hagiographical tradition he and his inner circle are writing and rewriting". These hagiographies contribute to the cohesion of the Diamond Way, and "this claim of normative transmission is emphasized in almost every public lecture given by Nydahl himself." According to Scherer, Nydahl presents himself as a lay-siddhi yogi, with a "polarizing style". The yogi-lay element is presented by Nydahl as a legitimization of his position as a teacher within the Karma Kagyu, and "addresses Nydahl's unconventional spiritual formation and education outside the prescribed curriculum of three-year retreats." (Note: Nydahl's story of his conversion to Buddhism and his stay in the Himalayas is often presented as his "three years in the Himalayas," and his "'three years of training' is narratively often constructed such that it invites the comparison (or even implicit identification) with the traditional three-year retreats," though the time he spent there was shorter. Jamgon Kongtrul (1813-1899), who established the three year retreat program on the basis of the Kalachakra Tantra and earlier models, explained that the purpose of the retreat is to use a solitary environment for spiritual development and does not suffice to produce graduates who would act as lamas; those who wish to do so must fulfill additional requirements. The Dalai Lama notes that "Nowadays the title lama is used in a variety of ways - in some cases it indicates a Dharma teacher, in others it indicates someone who has completed a three-year retreat.)

Scherer further notes that Nydahl's unconventional role as a siddhi-yogi, and his presentation of Mahamudra-teachings outside "the gradual Tantric trajectory", has historical precedents in the crazy yogis who established Tibetan Buddhism. These precedents are relevant in understanding Nydahl's role as a yogic/lay teacher. (Note: Scherer: "Lay practitioners, both patrons and tantric adepts, played a decisive role in the process of assimilation that formed Tibetan Buddhism(s). In the same way, lay people are now playing a key role during the westernization of Tibetan Buddhism(s). The Mahāsiddha / crazy yogi heritage and the medieval Tibetan doctrinal debate about teaching the Great Seal outside of the Tantra prove to be highly relevant historical precedents in the interpretation of unconventional modern/contemporary yogic/lay teachers such as the late Chogyam Trungpa and Ole Nydahl.") Lama Ole's first teacher, Lopon Tsechu Rinpoche, interpreted Nydahl's activity within the context of the Mahāsiddha tradition and the yogi/accomplisher way, stating, "Almost all of the 84 Mahasiddhas followed the lay way, only a few of them were monks and nuns. Nowadays, the lay way is natural and beneficial for many people."

=== Westernization and neo-orthopraxy ===
According to Borup, "[Nydahl] and his Diamond Way Buddhism is in no way representative of Buddhism, Tibetan Buddhism or the teachings of the Karma Kagyu lineage." Martin Baumann, a professor of religion at the University of Lucerne, remarked in a newspaper interview "when I listen to his [Nydahl's] alarmingly superficial formulations in his talks I can understand his critics who say that he is presenting a watered-down 'instant Buddhism', a sort of 'Buddhism light' for the West." (Note: Scherer: "[Baumann] criticizes the Diamond Way and its "Westernization" of Buddhist transmission and warns of diluting the teachings "into a form of 'instant-Buddhism'" (Baumann 2005: 377)." Scherer refers to: Baumann, Martin. "Shangri-La, Diaspora und Globalisierung: Tibetischer Buddhismus weltweit." In: "Die Welt des tibetischen Buddhismus," 357-388. Hamburg: Museum für Völkerkunde, (Mitteilungen aus dem Museum für Völkerkunde Hamburg, Neue Folge Band 36), 2005.)

In a 2009 article, Bee Scherer, a professor of gender studies and religious studies at Canterbury Christ Church University and a student of Thaye Dorje, as well as a former student of Ole Nydahl, examined if these criticisms apply to the core rituals and practices performed in the Diamond Way. Scherer describes a number of practices, some of which have been partly adapted to the west, while others are fully in line with traditional Karma Kagyu practices, concluding that Baumann's critique applies only partly. (Note: Scherer notes that the "core practice" is "the guru yoga on the Sixteenth Karma pa," composed in 1959 and adapted for the west. Scherer further notes that "every meditation and lecture ends with the traditional sung invocation of the Karma bKa' brgyud protector Mahākāla Ber nag can," keeping in line with traditional Karma Kagyu practices. Scherer further mentions Nydahl's teaching of the phowa practice and his "meticulous adherence to the traditional form and content of this Tantric practice," and his teaching of ngondro (preliminary) practices, about which Scherer states, "Nydahl's emphasis on the traditional lengthy Tantric gradual training, called the special preliminary practices or sngon 'gro, is not easily compatible with his alleged propagation of an "Instant-Buddhism"." Scherer also notes that "the translations [of the meditation texts] have been meticulously checked by Hannah Nydahl and Western Tibetan Studies scholars in collaboration with Tibetan scholar-monks." But Scherer also observes that only a small number of students partake in post-sngon 'gro practices, and that even some of the people appointed by Nydahl as teachers have not finished these practices, stating that Baumann's criticism of Nydahl applies here.) According to Scherer, Nydahl's Diamond Way practices can best be described as a "neo-orthopraxy", a new, westernized form of traditional practices. He regrets that Nydahl's ideas are not discussed by Tibet scholars, and opines that they have a duty to counterbalance the prevailing negative criticism by sociologists and students of New Religious Movements. (Note: According to Scherer, "the little recent academic attention Nydahl has drawn so far come, interestingly, from European sociologists of religions who specialize in New Religious Movements and Contemporary Religions/Buddhism(s). The neglect of Modern Tibetan Buddhist movements by classically trained Tibetologists is deplorable; the historical-critical methodology of Tibetan Studies can complement sociology and anthropology and add greatly to the discourses about authenticity and legitimization of movements such as Nydahl's Diamond Way")

=== Role in the Karmapa controversy ===
When a great Tibetan lama dies, it is tradition in Tibetan Buddhism to find the next reincarnation to continue the work. When Rangjung Rigpe Dorje, the Sixteenth Karmapa (head of the Karma Kagyu) died in 1981, two potential successors were found, Ogyen Trinley Dorje and Trinley Thaye Dorje, causing a major split in the Karma Kagyu. Because Shamar Rinpoche was one of Hannah and Ole Nydahl's main teachers, they supported his recognition of Trinley Thaye Dorje as the 17th Karmapa.

Geoffrey Samuel, an academic expert in the field testified in court, while the recognition of Ogyen Trinley "appears to have been accepted by a majority of Karma Kagyu monasteries and lamas, there remains a substantial minority of monasteries and lamas who have not accepted Ogyen Trinley as Karmapa. In particular, these include the Shamar Rinpoche, who historically has been the person most directly involved in the process of recognition."

It was largely because of the work of Hannah and Ole Nydahl that most European Karma Kagyu centers chose to support Trinley Thaye Dorje. As a result, Trinley Thaye Dorje is the "patron" of the centers of the Diamond Way Buddhism.

Due to his role in the Karmapa controversy, Nydahl has been heavily criticized by the supporters of Ogyen Trinley Dorje, such as the authors Mick Brown and Lea Terhune, a student of Tai Situpa. In connection to this, some blame Nydahl for causing the 1992 split of the Karma Kagyu, and accuse him of breaking the samayas to his teachers, which is deprecated in Vajrayana.

=== Political views ===
Some members of the press have criticized Nydahl's version of Diamond Way Buddhism, describing it as featuring "prevalent militaristic appearances, right-wing political views and fierce anti-Islam rhetoric". Others have more positive views of Nydahl's work, describing his dedication to his work and patriotism. Scherer describes Nydahl's representation of himself as "a Buddhist teacher and protector of Western freedom". This addresses his legitimization narrative of himself as emanation of a Buddhist protector and his Kālacakra-linked fierce interpretation of Islam in particular as a key threat to Western freedom and human, especially women's rights. Nydahl has referred to the Islamic religion as "criminal", has called Allah a "terrible god", and has characterized Muslim beliefs as antithetical to freedom of speech and women's rights:

I seriously hope, you know, that we're not losing the freedom of expression right now, that we're not losing the ability to say what we think even if we step on the toes of some gentlemen from the Near East … who like to beat their wives or stone them or whatever else they do, right?

Nydahl said that he did not make political comments in his capacity as a lama, but as a "responsible, thinking human being", and that no one can make such statements from a Buddhist perspective because Buddha Shakyamuni did not comment on religious ideas founded centuries after his death.

An online interview with Nydahl also featured the following statement: "Judaism and Christianity are fine. Islam, I warn against. I know the Koran, I know the life story of Mohammad and I think we cannot use that in our society today."

=== Dispute with German Buddhist Union ===
Between late 1999 and April 2000 there was a public dispute between the German Buddhist Union and the German branch of Diamond Way, which was a member organisation of the Union. Due to Nydahl's disparaging attitude towards Islam, his political statements, his manner of expressing and presenting himself, and his relationships with women, (Note: Scherer: "Nydahl propagates a selfproclaimed ‘non-neurotic approach’ to sexuality: while celibacy pertains to monks, it is not for a lay person like himself. Nydahl was happily married to his wife Hannah until her death in 2007. Nydahl was also openly promiscuous, sleeping with many female students during his earlier teaching tours in the 1970s and 1980s. In 1990 he committed himself to a steady second intimate partner, Caty Hartung, a relation which lasted for fourteen years.) there were calls for the expulsion of Nydahl's organisation from the Union. The dispute was resolved at a meeting between the two organizations on 4 October 2000; although differences were clear, they agreed to learn from the past and cooperate in the future. The conversation was described as "a first step" that "should eliminate misunderstandings, and lead to clarity and cooperation". The German branch of Diamond Way (Buddhistischer Dachverband Diamantweg) remained a member of the German Buddhist Union. In 2019 there were discussions and an application to exclude the Diamond Way from the German Buddhist Union (DBU), based on Nydahl's statements about Islam. DBU members were worried about possible damage to reputation and the German section of Diamond Way decided to leave the DBU.

== Personal life and death ==
Ole Nydahl met his future wife Hannah when he was 10 and she was five. They met again just after Nydahl came out of the army. Hannah Nydahl died of lung cancer in 2007.

In 2014 Nydahl married Alexandra Munoz Barbosa at the Copenhagen Diamond Way Buddhist center. In 2017 they were divorced.

In an interview in 2017, Nydahl mentioned he had fathered two children.

On 31 August 2019, Nydahl and Anne Behrend were married at the Diamond Way Buddhist center in Těnovice, Czech Republic. On 18 December 2020, they welcomed the birth of their daughter Freya.

Nydahl died on 18 May 2026, at the age of 85.

== Bibliography ==
Ole Nydahl has written several books in English, German and Danish, which have been translated into several other European languages.

Selected English titles:

- Entering the Diamond Way: My Path Among the Lamas. Blue Dolphin Publishing (1985). ISBN 978-0-931892-03-5
- Ngondro: The Four Foundational Practices of Tibetan Buddhism. Blue Dolphin Publishing (1990). ISBN 978-0-931892-23-3
- Mahamudra: Boundless Joy and Freedom. Blue Dolphin Publishing (1991). ISBN 978-0-931892-69-1
- Riding the Tiger: Twenty Years on the Road - Risks and Joys of Bringing Tibetan Buddhism to the West. Blue Dolphin Publishing (1992). ISBN 978-0-931892-67-7
- The Way Things Are: A living Approach to Buddhism for today's world. Blue Dolphin Publishing (2008) ISBN 978-0-931892-38-7
- The Great Seal: Limitless Space and Joy - The Mahamudra View of Diamond Way Buddhism. Fire Wheel Publishing (2004). ISBN 0-9752954-0-3
- The Way Things Are: A living Approach to Buddhism. O Books (2008) 2nd Extended edition. ISBN 978-1-84694-042-2
- Buddha and Love: Timeless Wisdom for Modern Relationships. Brio Books (2012). ISBN 978-1937061845
- Fearless Death: Buddhist Wisdom on the Art of Dying. Brio Books (2012). ISBN 978-1937061098
