= Nydahl =

Nydahl is a surname. Notable people with the surname are as follows:

- Hannah Nydahl (1946–2007), Danish teacher of Tibetan Buddhism
- Ole Nydahl (1941–2026), Danish teacher of Tibetan Buddhism
- Tomas Nydahl (born 1968), Swedish tennis player
