= Mick Brown (journalist) =

British journalist (born 1950)

Mick Brown (born 1950 in London), educated at Reigate Grammar School, is a British journalist who has written for several British newspapers, including The Guardian and The Sunday Times, and for international publications. For many years he has contributed regularly to The Daily Telegraph. He is also a broadcaster and the author of several books.

Brown has written many articles about rock music and in 2007 wrote Tearing Down the Wall of Sound, a biography of record producer Phil Spector. Brown's biography of entrepreneur Richard Branson was first published in 1989. A revised edition appeared in 1998.

Brown's book, The Dance of 17 Lives (2004), told the story of the 17th Karmapa, one of the most important figures in Tibetan Buddhism. This book covers the life of Urgyen Trinley Dorje and clarifies the politics surrounding his recognition.

His book, The Spiritual Tourist, catalogued contemporary spiritual quests around the globe, particularly in India. Brown also compiled a companion album to the book, Music for the Spiritual Tourist.

== Publications ==
- Richard Branson: The Inside Story. London: Headline. 1988. ISBN 0-7472-3216-4.
- American Heartbeat: Travels from Woodstock to San Jose by Song Title. London: Penguin Group. 1994. ISBN 0-14-017165-7.
- The Spiritual Tourist: A Personal Odyssey through the Outer Reaches of Belief. London: Bloomsbury Publishing. 1999. ISBN 0-7475-4282-1.
- The Dance of 17 Lives: The Incredible True Story of Tibet's 17th Karmapa. London: Bloomsbury. 2004. ISBN 0-7475-7161-9.
- Mick Brown on Performance (Bloomsbury Movie Guide). London: Bloomsbury. ISBN 1-58234-043-9.
- Tearing Down the Wall of Sound: The Rise and Fall of Phil Spector. London: Bloomsbury. 2007. ISBN 1-58234-043-9.
- The Nirvana Express: How the Search for Enlightenment Went West. London: Hurst. 2023. ISBN 9781805260196.
