= Hannah Nydahl =

Danish Buddhist teacher (1946-2007)

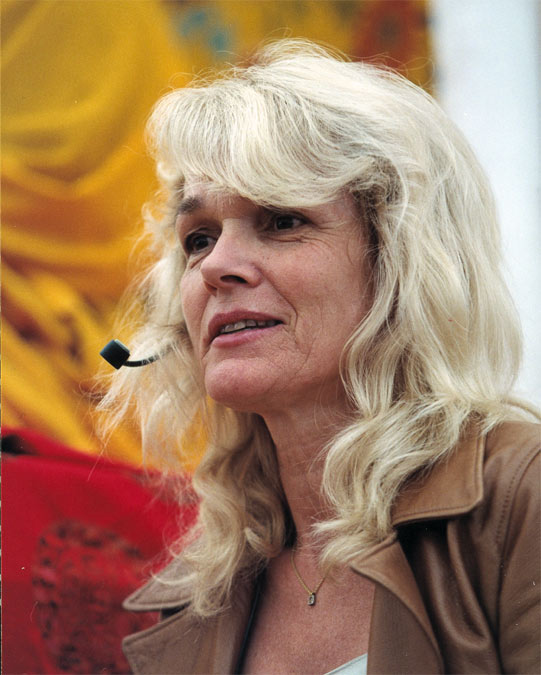
- Born: 17 April 1946; Copenhagen, Denmark
- Died: 1 April 2007 (aged 60); Copenhagen, Denmark
- Spouse: Lama Ole Nydahl

Hannah Nydahl (17 April 1946 – 1 April 2007) was a Danish teacher and translator in the Karma Kagyu lineage of Tibetan Buddhism. She was the wife of Lama Ole Nydahl.

== Early life ==
She was born and died in Copenhagen, Denmark. Hannah and her husband Ole Nydahl, who assisted her work, were childhood friends, meeting for the first time when Hannah was 5 and Ole 10.

== Involvement with Buddhism ==
Under the spiritual direction of The 16th Gyalwa Karmapa, Rangjung Rigpe Dorje Hannah Nydahl and Ole Nydahl Founded Diamond Way Buddhism, a Buddhist organization for lay practitioners within the Karma Kagyu school of Tibetan Buddhism.

Hannah and Ole Nydahl were introduced to Buddhism on their honeymoon in Nepal in 1968, and were among the first Westerners to become students of the 16th Karmapa in 1969. (British nun Freda Bedi took refuge in 1960). After a three-year period of study they were sent back to Europe by the 16th Karmapa to found centers in his name.

She was a Buddhist teacher like her husband (sometimes referred to as Lamini or female Lama), but the main role of Hannah Nydahl was as a translator for Lamas like the 16th Karmapa, Lopon Tsechu Rinpoche, Kalu Rinpoche etc. In an interview she explained, "I do not mind teaching but when I am together with Ole it is more natural that he teaches. When I am not with him I mainly translate and organize for the Tibetan lamas."

In the magazine Kagyu Life International she was described in this way: "Hannah Nydahl is a much sought after translator and interpreter of Tibetan Buddhist philosophy. She divides her time between translating for the lamas at the Karmapa International Buddhist Institute in New Delhi, India, participating in various Buddhist text translation projects, organizing schedules and visits of high Rinpoches in the lineage, and traveling around the world with Lama Ole."

She spoke Danish, German, English, and Tibetan fluently. As few Tibetan teachers spoke English, she learned Tibetan, from Tarab Tulku at Copenhagen University. Since all texts were in Tibetan, her work included translating texts, and spoken translation for the teaching Lamas at the Karmapa International Buddhist Institute in New Delhi, India, participation in various Buddhist text translation projects, as well as organizing and translating lectures for Tibetan Lamas.

== Death and legacy ==
In 2006 Hannah Nydahl was diagnosed with terminal lung cancer and died three months later. Just a few days before Hannah died, the Diamond Way Buddhism Foundation purchased a 50 hectare property with historic structures in the German Alps. The Europe Center is the site of a yearly international meditation summer course where up to 4000 Buddhists from 50 countries participate in empowerments, teachings and meditations.

She was widely respected for her work, devotion and accomplishments as a Buddhist practitioner. A Danish newspaper even referred to her as the "Mother of Buddhism". Jørn Borup, Department of Study of Religion at University of Aarhus said: "The most lasting influence on the Buddhist practice scene in Denmark was triggered by Ole and Hannah Nydahl backpacking in the spiritual East during their honeymoon in Nepal in 1968."

A documentary about Hannah Nydahl, titled Hannah: Buddhism's Untold Story, was screened for the first time at the ARPA International Film Festival (held at the Egyptian Theatre in Los Angeles) on 15 September 2014 where it won the audience award for Best Documentary. The film was later screened around the world, including at various festivals where it won further awards, and has received positive reviews from film critics. It is now available on Netflix and Amazon in North America.
