= Rumtek Monastery =

Tibetan Buddhist gompa near Gangtok, Sikkim, India

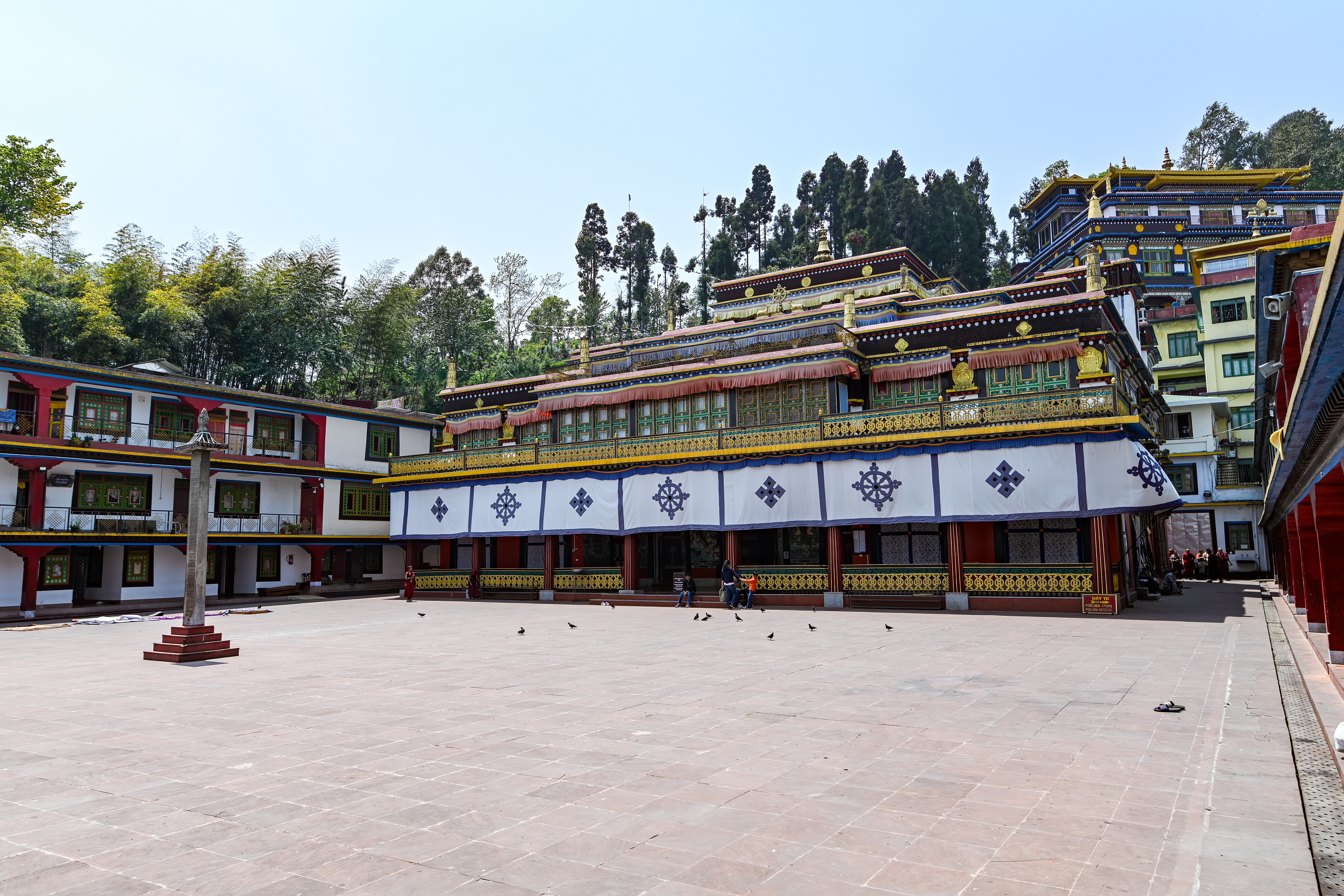
- Rumtek Monastery

- Location within Sikkim

Religion
- Affiliation: Tibetan Buddhism
- Sect: Karma Kagyu

Location
- Location: Near Gangtok, Sikkim, India
- Country: India
- Coordinates: 27°17′19″N 88°33′41″E

Architecture
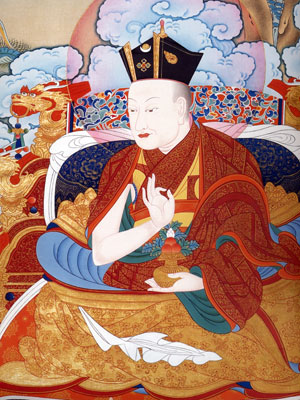
- Founder: Wangchuk Dorje, 9th Karmapa Lama
- Established: 1966; 60 years ago
- Completed: 16th century

Rumtek Monastery (Tibetan: རུམ་ཐེག་དགོན་པ་, Wylie: rum theg dgon pa), also called the Dharma Chakra Centre, is a gompa located in the Indian state of Sikkim near the capital Gangtok. It is the seat in exile of the Gyalwang Karmapa, inaugurated in 1966 by the 16th Karmapa. It is also a focal point for the sectarian tensions within the Karma Kagyu school of Tibetan Buddhism that characterize the 17th Karmapa controversy.

== History ==
Originally built under the direction of Changchub Dorje, 12th Karmapa Lama in the mid-18th century, Rumtek served as the main seat of the Karma Kagyu lineage in Sikkim for some time. But when Rangjung Rigpe Dorje, 16th Karmapa, arrived in Sikkim in 1959 after fleeing Tibet, the monastery was in ruins. Despite being offered other sites, the Karmapa decided to rebuild Rumtek. To him, the site possessed many auspicious qualities and was surrounded by the most favorable attributes. For example, flowing streams, mountains behind, a snow range in front, and a river below. With the generosity and help of the Sikkim royal family and the local folks of Sikkim, it was built by the 16th Karmapa as his main seat in exile.

After four years, construction of the monastery was completed. The sacred items and relics brought out from Tsurphu Monastery, the Karmapa's seat in Tibet, were installed. On Losar in 1966, the 16th Karmapa officially inaugurated the new seat, called "The Dharmachakra Centre", a place of erudition and spiritual accomplishment, the seat of the glorious Karmapa.

The monastery is currently the largest in Sikkim. It is home to the community of monks and where they perform the rituals and practices of the Karma Kagyu lineage. A golden stupa contains the relics of the 16th Karmapa. Opposite that building is a college, Karma Shri Nalanda Institute for Higher Buddhist Studies.

Rumtek is located 24 kilometres (15 mi) from Gangtok, the capital of Sikkim, at an altitude of about 1,500 metres (4,900 ft).

== Controversy ==
Rumtek was in the centre of the Karmapa controversy, with a lengthy battle which played out in the Indian courts. Two rival organisations, each supporting a different candidate for the 17th Karmapa, claimed stewardship of the monastery and its contents. The two organisations are the Tsurphu Labrang (supporting Ogyen Trinley Dorje) and the Karmapa Charitable Trust (supporting Trinley Thaye Dorje). Neither candidate resides, nor has been enthroned, at Rumtek. Ogyen Trinley Dorje was enthroned at Tsurphu Monastery. Ogyen Trinley Dorje's followers maintain that the trust was established solely for the sake of seeing to the welfare of the Karmapa's followers, providing funds for the maintenance of the monastery, and for the monks' medical fees. The administration of the monastery was the responsibility of the Tsurphu Labrang, which was organized as a legal entity for a related case:

In 1982, Shamar Rinpoche and his cousin, Topga Yugyal, gained control of the estate at Rumtek monastery a month after the 16th Karmapa's passing. Three monasteries in Bhutan were sold, and control was gained over the Karmapa Charitable Trust, organized in 1961 by the 16th Karmapa. Disagreements over the Shamarpa's and Topga's financial dealings began in 1988. Beginning in 1992, the monastery became the site of pitched battles between monks supporting one candidate or the other.

Control of Rumtek Monastery became the subject of a legal contest filed in 1998 "by the Karmapa Charitable Trust, [and the plaintiffs] Shri T.S. Gyaltshen, Kunzig Shamar Rinpoche, and Shri Gyan Jyoti Kansakar against the State of Sikkim, the Secretary of Ecclessiastical Affairs and Goshir Gyaltsab Rinpoche. The plaintiffs seek to evict the monks and other occupants of Dhama Chakra Centre, Rumtek and to possess and administer the monastery for their own purposes."

In 2003, monks supporting Trinley Thaye Dorje were thrown out of Rumtek by Indian security forces in order to quell violence between the two factions, and armed Indian soldiers patrol the monastery to prevent further sectarian violence.

== Gallery ==
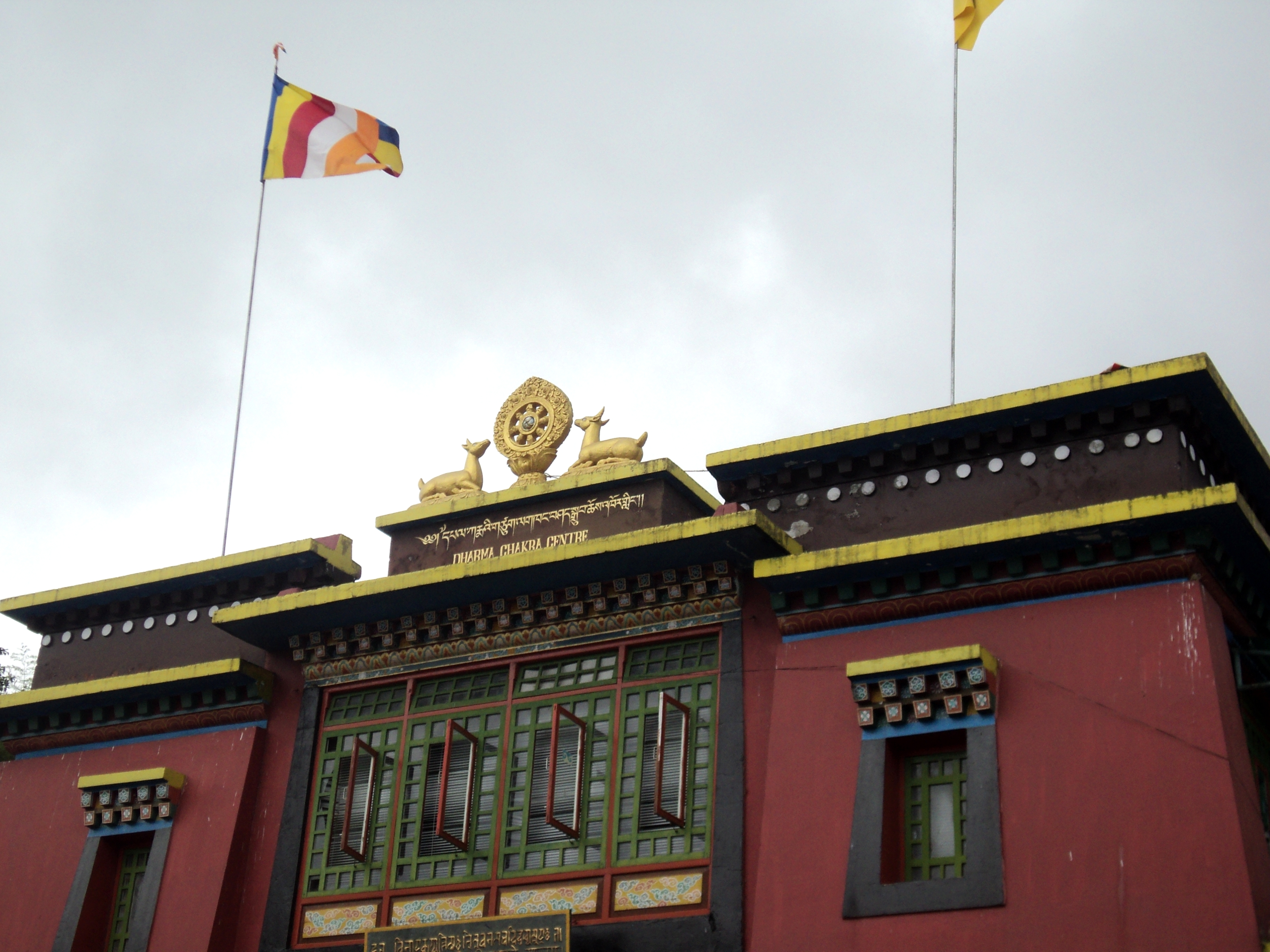
Dharma Chakra Centre

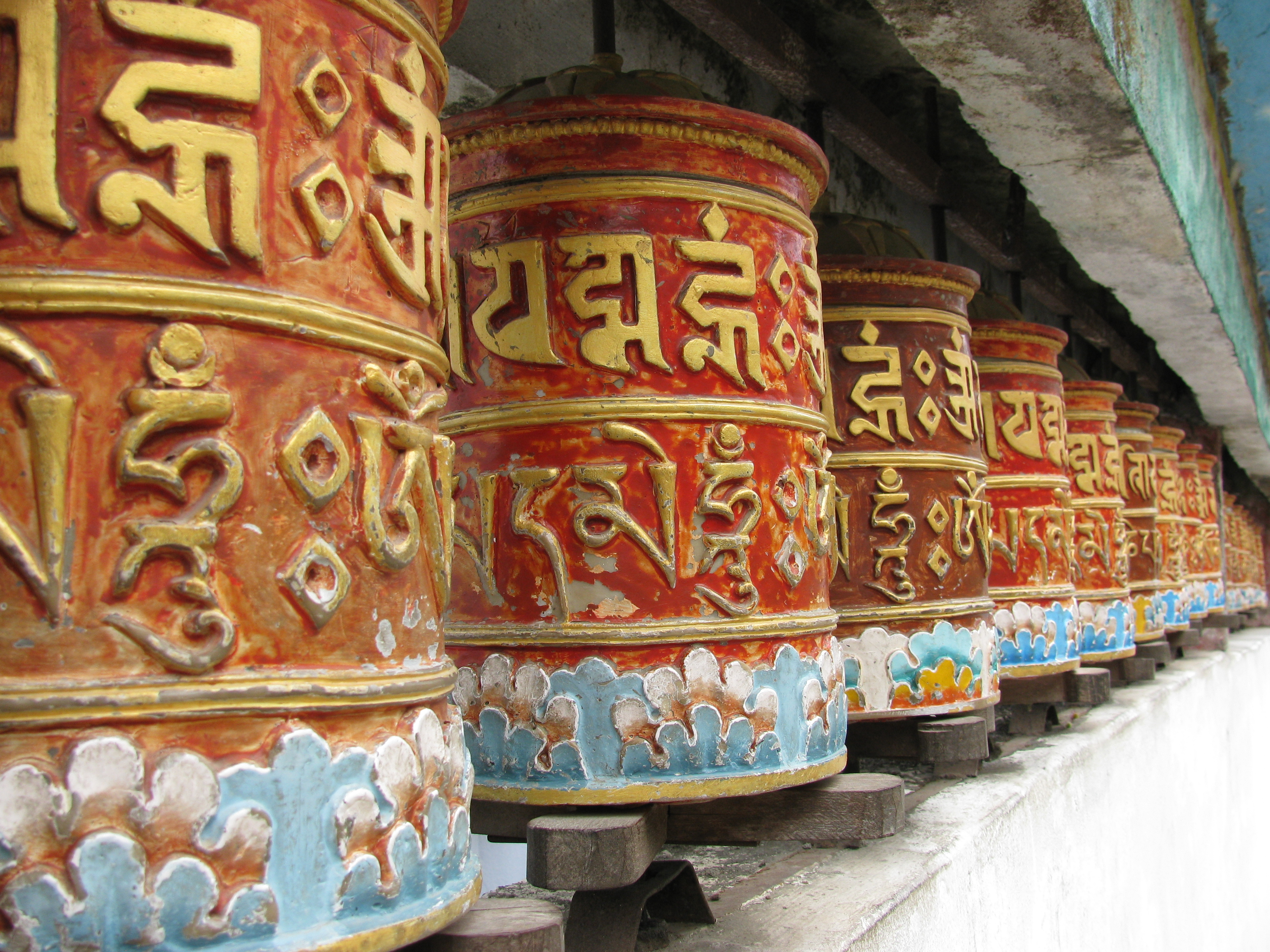
Prayer Wheels in the Monastery

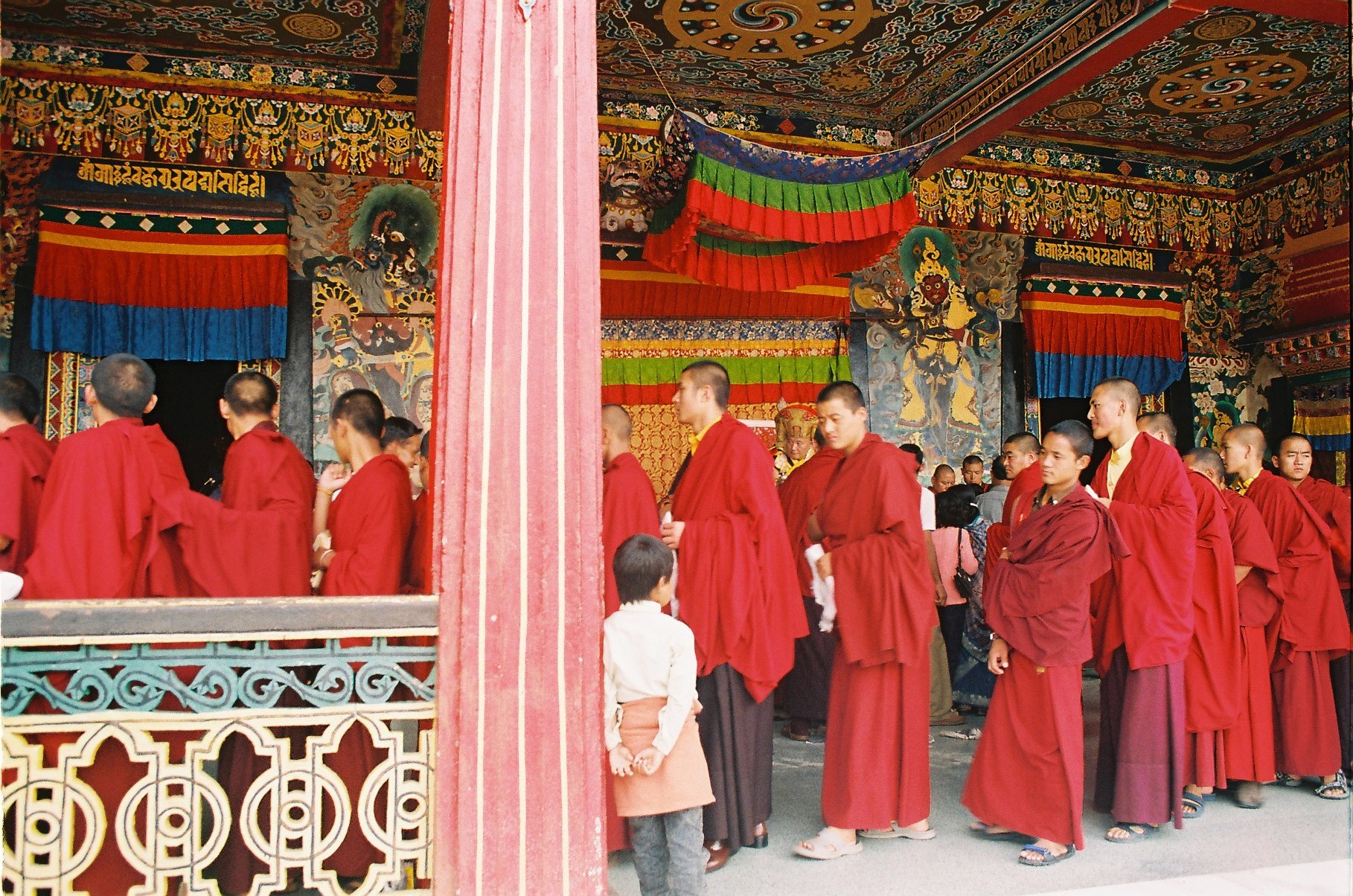
Students of Rumtek Monastery

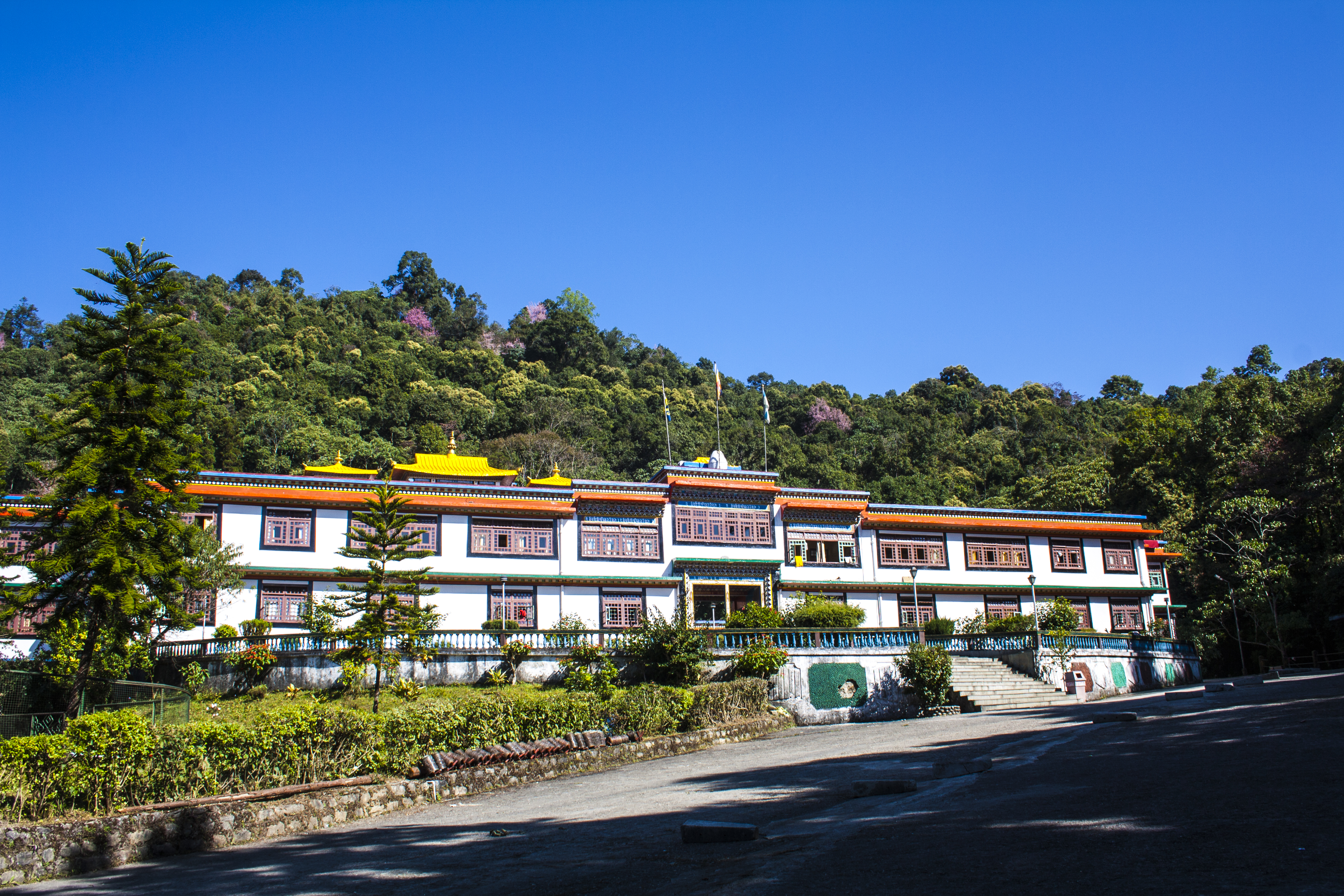
Rumtek Monastery

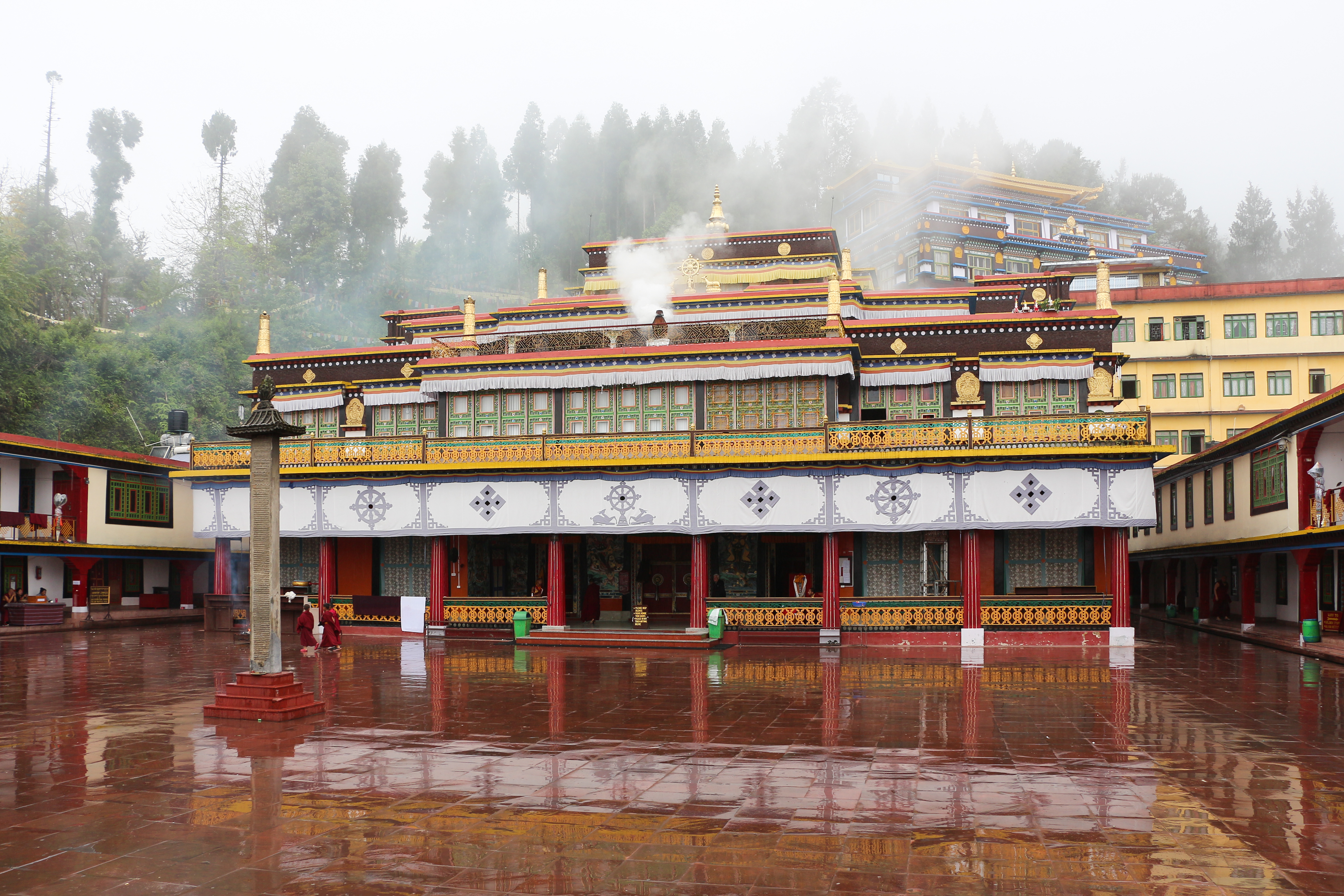
Rumtek Monastery

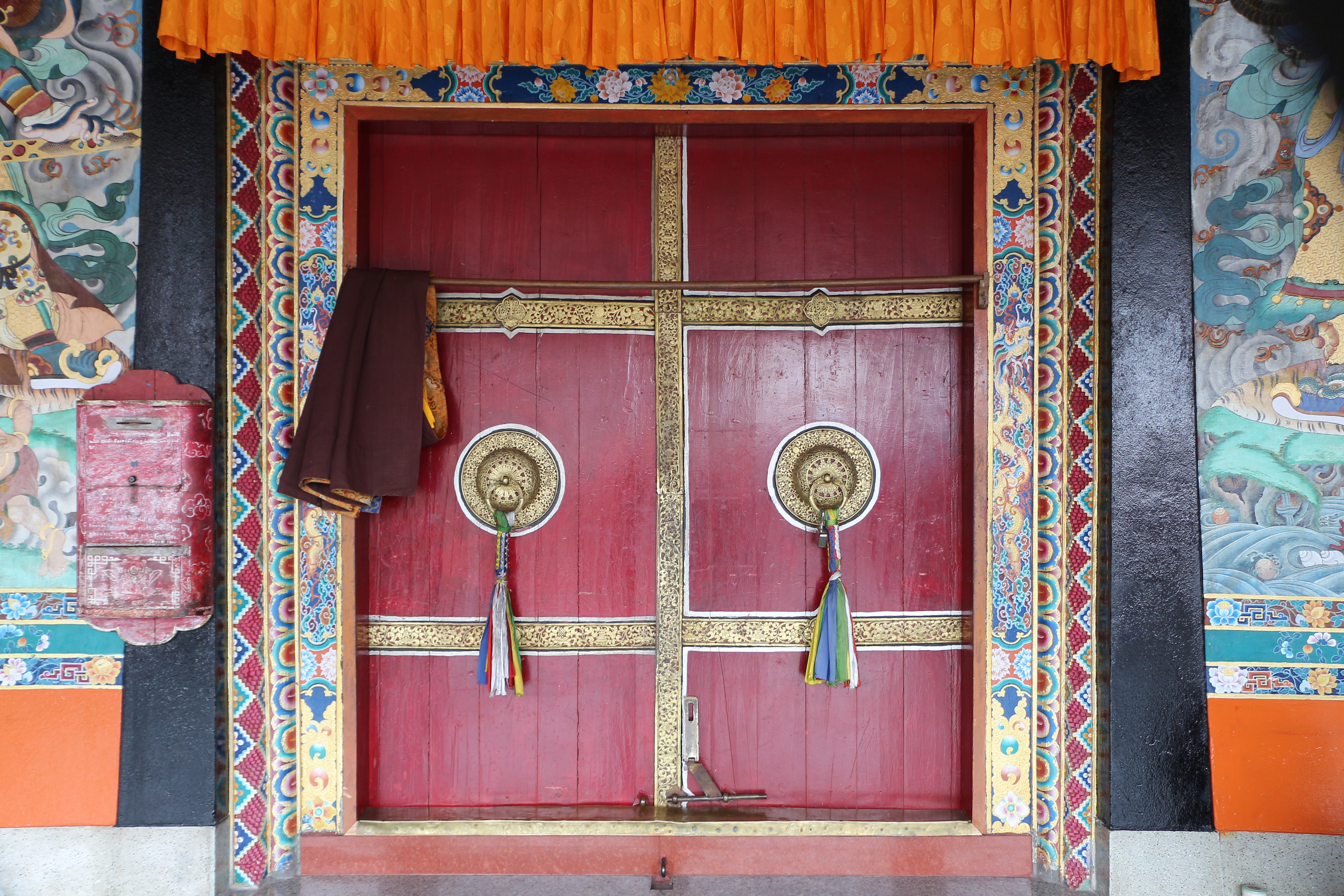
Doors in Rumtek Monastery

== See also ==
- Tourism in North East India
