= Shamarpa =

Title in Tibetan Buddhism

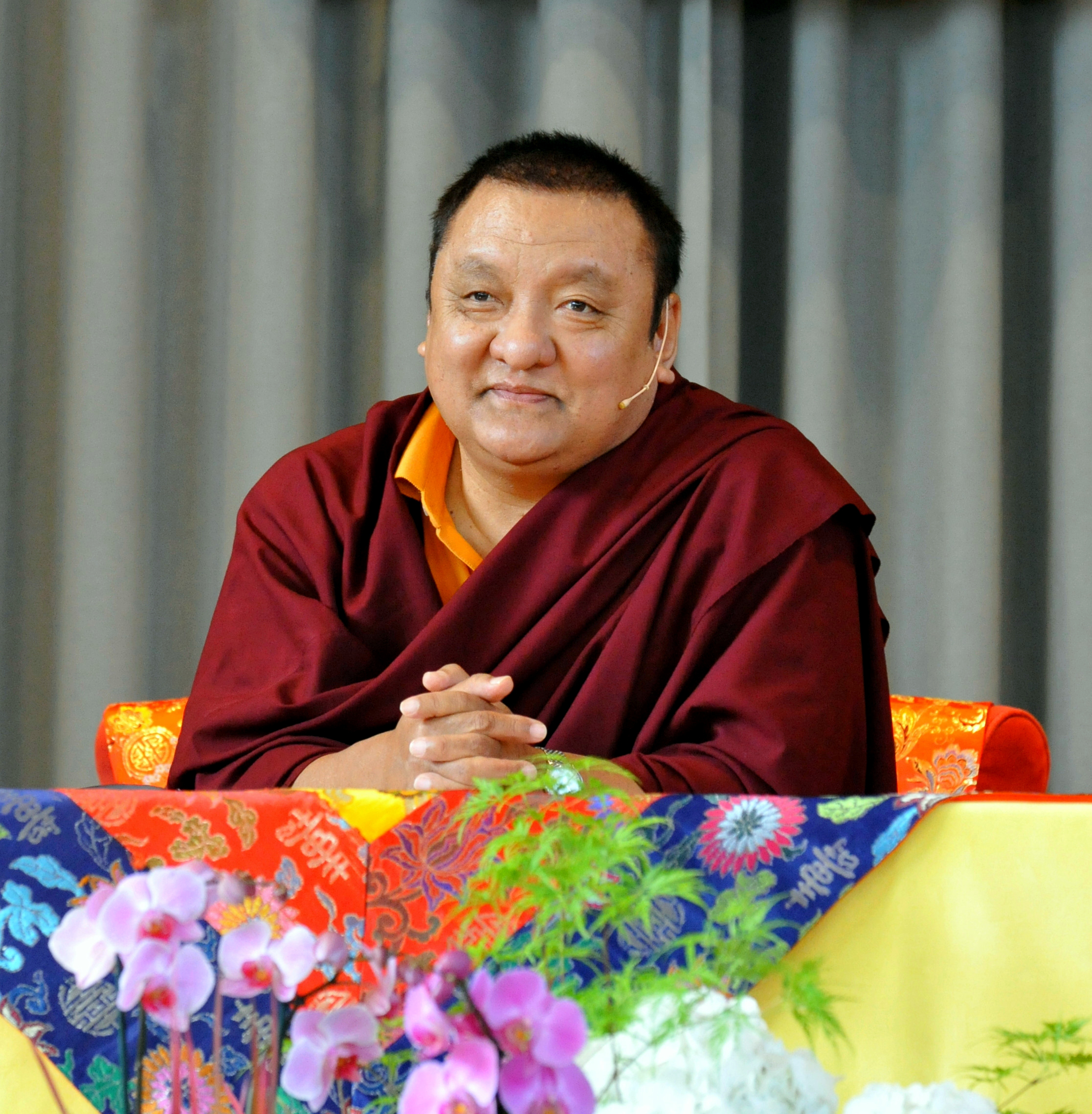
The 14th Shamarpa teaching

The Shamarpa (Tibetan: ཞྭ་དམར་པ་, Wylie: zhwa dmar pa; literally, "Person (i.e. Holder) of the Red Crown"), also known as Shamar Rinpoche, or more formally Künzig Shamar Rinpoche, is the second-oldest lineage of tulkus (reincarnated lamas). He is one of the highest lineage holders of the Karma Kagyu school of Tibetan Buddhism and is regarded as the mind manifestation of Amitābha. He is traditionally associated with Yangpachen Monastery near Lhasa.

The first Shamarpa, Drakpa Senggé (Wylie: grags pa seng+ge, 1283–1349), received the title "Shamarpa", and a red crown, an exact replica of Karmapa’s black crown from Rangjung Dorje, 3rd Karmapa, establishing the second line of reincarnate lamas in Tibetan Buddhism. The Karmapa was the first.

The Shamarpa is often referred to as the "Red Hat Karmapa", especially in early Kagyu texts.

The 5th Dalai Lama saw the Shamarpa as equal to the Karmapa:

Since Je Chen-nga Thamchad Khyenpa Chokyi Dragpa (the Fourth Shamarpa) ascended the throne of the Phagdrupa dynasty, there was no longer any difference between the Red Hat and the Black Hat Karmapas. This was the reason why I afforded them both equal status.

== The Shamarpa lineage ==
Shamarpa considered to be successive reincarnations are listed in "The Garland of Moon Water Crystal" by the 8th Tai Situpa Chökyi Jungne and Belo Tsewang Künkhyab.

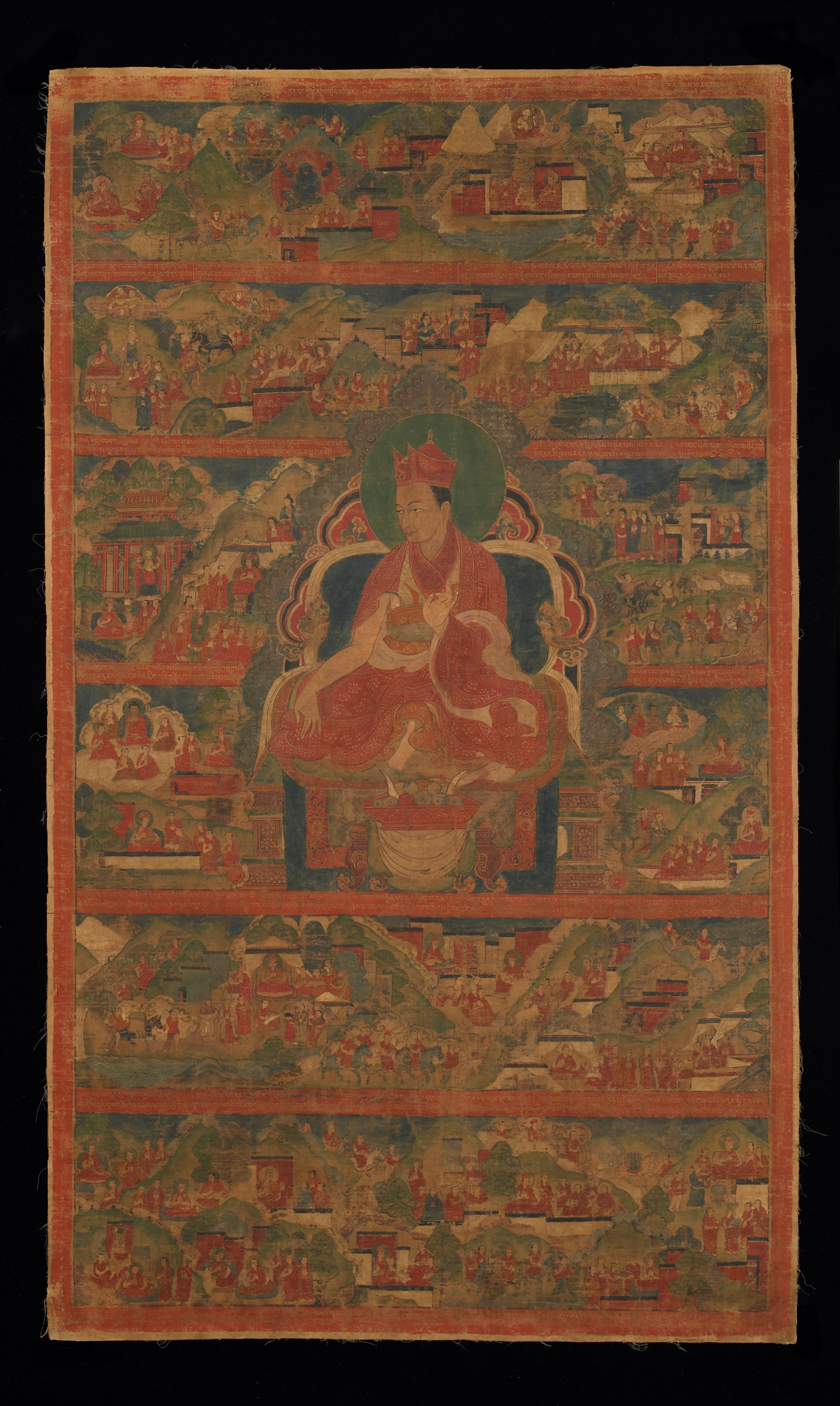
Chodag Yeshe Palzang, the 4th Shamar Rinpoche, 16th-century painting from the Rubin Museum of Art

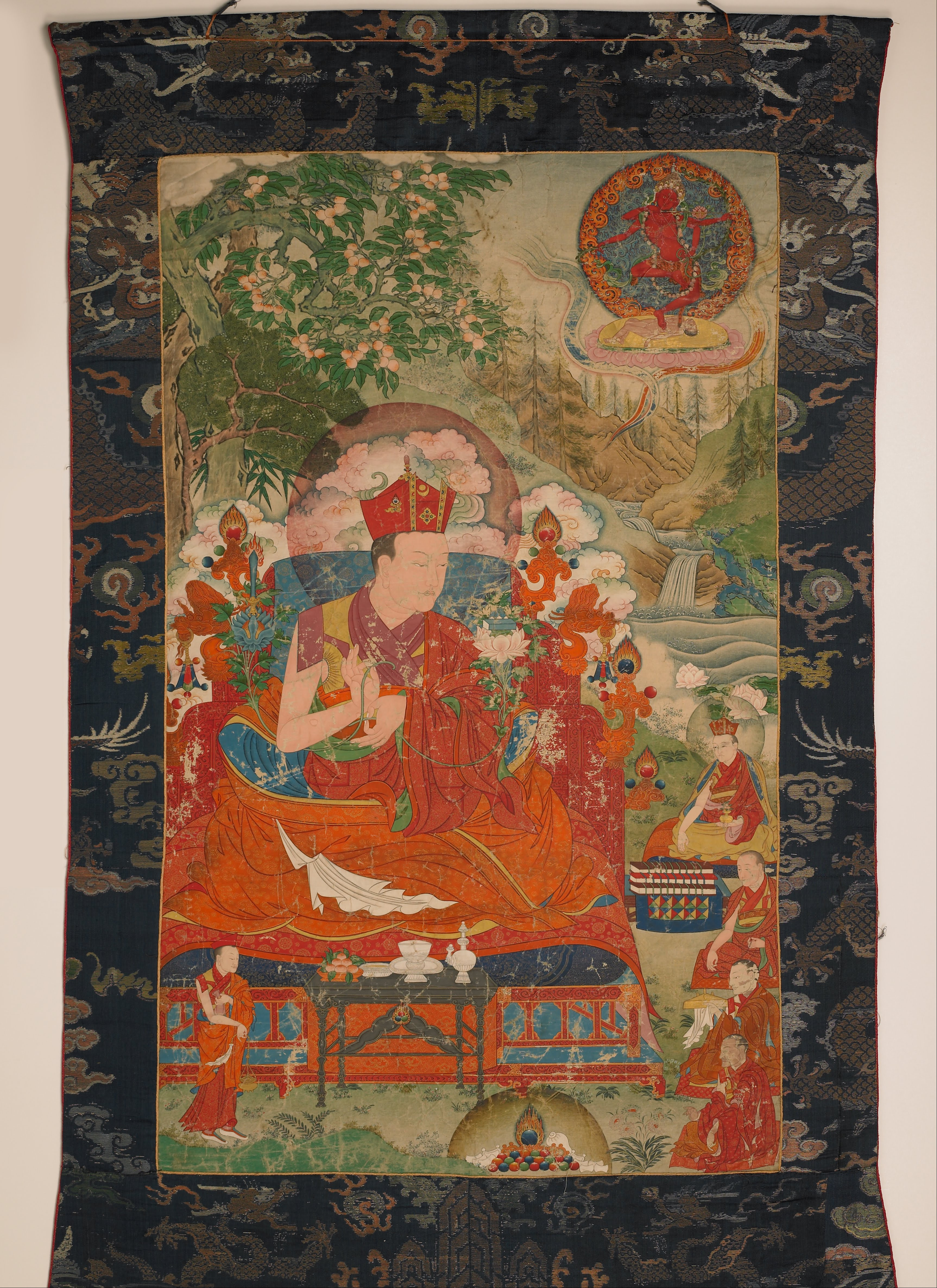
Mipam Chokyi Wangchug (1584–1630), the 6th Shamar Rinpoche, 16th-century painting from the Rubin Museum of Art

1. Khedrup Drakpa Senge (1284–1349) was the principal disciple of the 3rd Karmapa. The Good Kalpa Sutra predicted that, "in the future, a maha-bodhisattva with a ruby-red crown shall come to the suffering multitude, leading them out of their cyclic bewilderment and misery." It is a common belief among Karma Kagyus that Buddha Shakyamuni’s prediction was fulfilled in the appearance of the Shamarpa, whose ruby red crown was presented by the 3rd Karmapa to the first Shamarpa, Khedrup Drakpa Senge. In addition the 2nd Karmapa, Karma Pakshi, predicted that "future Karmapas shall manifest in two Nirmanakaya forms." The ruby-red crown is an exact replica of Karmapa’s black crown (apart from the color). In this manner it was meant to symbolize the identicalness of the Shamarpas and the Karmapas. The first Shamarpa spent the last 20 years of his life in retreat at Tsurphu and Nenang Monasteries teaching students dedicated to attaining enlightenment.
2. Shamar Khachö Wangpo (1350–1405) was recognized by the 4th Karmapa. Having been the student and main lineage holder of the Fourth Karmapa, he passed on the esoteric instructions of the Karma Kagyu tradition to the 5th Karmapa. His collected works comprise eight volumes and are considered to have given specific meaning to many Kagyu teachings.
3. Shamar Chöpal Yeshe (1406–1452). Chöpal Yeshe is renowned for having constructed several monasteries and retreat-centers. He was also able to abolish the practice of animal sacrifice in the regions of Tibet where that custom had continued as a part of animist rituals. The 3rd Shamarpa was given the Kagyu transmission and full authorization to teach by the 5th Karmapa. The Yongle Emperor of China, who was also a student of the 5th Karmapa, was intrigued by Shamarpa’s ability to recall past lives in vivid detail. Out of devotion, he gave precious gifts to the Shamarpa. In a letter of thanks Shamarpa reminded the emperor of the basic principle of benevolence in Buddhism, that he might be ever mindful of the well-being of his people. The 3rd Shamarpa also enthroned the 6th Karmapa and gave him his first traditional teachings.
4. Shamar Chokyi Drakpa Yeshe Pal Zangpo (1453–1526) was recognized by the 7th Karmapa, who became his Lama. The famous Tibetan monastery Ga Mamo Tashi Rabten was founded by him. He also established many smaller monasteries. During his travels outside Tibet, Chökyi Tragpa built many monasteries, among others there are four monasteries in Bhutan and he was the first of the Shamar reincarnates to visit Nepal where he built a small monastery in Swayambhunath, one of the country's most sacred places. Upon returning to his homeland, he acted as the king of Tibet for a period of twelve years and he ruled the country on the basis of strict adherence to Buddhist principles.
5. Shamar Köncho Yenlak (1526–1583) was identified by the 8th Karmapa at the age of 2 and became one of his most outstanding students. Shamarpa stayed with the Karmapa until the age of twelve, receiving the Six Yogas of Naropa, Mahamudra, and other teachings of the Kagyu lineage. The 8th Karmapa entrusted the 5th Shamarpa with the letters containing the prediction of his next rebirth. The 5th Shamarpa also recognized and became the Lama of the 9th Karmapa, giving him refuge and the Bodhisattva promise, ordination, as well as transmissions on various texts and meditations—including the texts and tantric meditations of the Kagyu lineage.
6. Shamar Mipan Chökyi Wangchuk (1584–1629) was recognized by the 9th Karmapa who was his main Lama.
7. Shamar Yeshe Nyinpo (1631–1694) was recognized by the 10th Karmapa, and he became the Karmapa's disciple.
8. Palchen Chökyi Döndrup (1695–1732) was born in Yilmo, Nepal and was taken to Tibet at age 7. He received teachings and instructions from the 11th Karmapa before his death. The Shamarpa in turn, recognized and enthroned 12th Karmapa as the 12th Karmapa and acted as his Root-guru.
9. Könchog Geway Jungnay (1733–1741) was born in Paro in Bhutan, and was discovered by the 13th Karmapa, but lived only until age nine.
10. Mipam Chödrup Gyamtso (1742–1793) was the stepbrother of the 6th Panchen Lama, Lobsang Palden Yeshe (1738–1780). He was taught primarily by the eight Tai Situ Rinpoche, and also recognized the ninth Tai Situ Rinpoche. Shamar Tulku spent many years reviving the Dharma in Tibet. In particular, Shamar Tulku attempted to bring the Kagyu teachings to central Tibet, which was a stronghold of Gelugpa-allied political elements at the time, with the help of his brother the 6th Panchen Lama of the Gelugpa lineage. After carrying out this activity Shamarpa went on pilgrimage to Nepal. According to some sources, a dispute over his claim to his stepbrother's material inheritance led to an armed conflict in which the Shamarpa conspired with the Nepalese Gurkha army in 1788. According to other sources, while Shamarpa was on a pilgrimage to Nepal, fighting broke out between the Nepalese Gurkhas and Tibet. Shamarpa attempted to make peace and mediate in the conflict. In Tibet the influential Gelugpa minister Tagtsag Tenpai Gonpo saw an opportunity to remove a perceived political threat and acquire property. He spread rumors that Shamarpa was instigating the fighting and seized Yang Chen monastery from Shamarpa. The monks were forcibly converted to the Gelug school. Subsequently an order was passed by the government that all of Shamarpa’s monasteries must convert to the Gelug school. This, and other disputes between the Gelug and Kagyu schools led to the exile from Tibet of the Shamarpa and a legal ban by the Tibetan government on further Shamarpa incarnations This ban remained in place until after the Dalai Lama lost power in Tibet during the 1950s, although it was later revealed that the Karmapa had recognized reincarnations of the Shamarpa secretly during the intervening period.
11. Unknown, presumed forced into hiding by the Tibetan government.
12. Tugsay Jamyang (1895–1947) was the son of the 15th Karmapa. However, it is recorded that he taught and practiced Buddhism as a layman.
13. Tinlay Kunchap (1948–1950), an infant who survived only a little over a year
14. Mipham Chokyi Lodro (1952–2014) was born in Derge, Tibet and at the age of four he was recognized by the 16th Karmapa. He died on 11 June 2014 in Germany.

== Namling Shamar ==
Following the death of the 9th Shamarpa, two different children were identified as possible candidates to be the reincarnation: one was Mipam Chödrup Gyamtso, the stepbrother of the 6th Panchen Lama; the other was Könchok Garwang Gyatso (དཀོན་མཆོག་གར་དབང་རྒྱ་མཚོ) of the Namseling (རྣམ་སྲས་གླིང) family. The dispute was resolved by lot: Mipam Chödrup Gyamtso's name was drawn and he was enthroned as the 10th Shamarpa. Könchok Garwang Gyatso was referred to as the Shamar Trisur or "former Shamarpa"; according to some accounts, he "abdicated" following the lottery, implying that he had originally been enthroned. In any event, the Shamar Trisur took up residence on his family's estate at Namseling Manor, near Samye Monastery, and became a lama. Following his death c. 1792, a reincarnation was identified, establishing a lineage known as Namling Shamar. The most recent Namling Shamar was the 5th, who was identified by the 15th Karmapa (1871–1922) and lived until 1982.

== Controversy ==
In 1792 the Tibetan government accused the 10th Shamarpa of inciting a war between Tibet and Nepal. He was exiled from Tibet and a ban placed on his future incarnations from being officially recognized. A modern Tibetologist, Sam Van Schaik, has suggested this interpretation of history to be wrong and has claimed that the Shamarpa mediated in the conflict.

The comment of the Sixteenth Gyalwa Karmapa on this period was: "Merit was becoming smaller and smaller. There was much political interference. Black was becoming white. The real was becoming unreal. At that time it was not practicable to have any Shamarpa recognised or enthroned. Everything was kept secret. The incarnations appeared, but were not revealed." In 1963, following a request from the 16th Karmapa, the Tibetan Government in Exile lifted the ban. The 14th Shamar Rinpoche was officially enthroned, and after completing his studies in 1979 began his extensive teaching activity.

Another controversy began in 1992, during the search for and recognition of the 17th Gyalwa Karmapa. A division formed within the Karma Kagyu sangha over the selection of two Karmapa candidates. The Karmapa controversy has its roots in feudalistic Tibetan history, and is connected with politics of China and India as well. The Karmapa candidates Ogyen Trinley Dorje and Thaye Dorje have met each other, and issued joint statements calling for cooperation, and the wish to find the 15th Shamar Rinpoche together.

== 14th Shamarpa ==
The 14th Shamarpa was Mipham Chokyi Lodro, born in Derge, Tibet in 1952. At age four, he revealed his identity as the Shamarpa by recognizing old monks from Yangpochen monastery, the ancestral seat of the Shamarpas. His uncle, the 16th Karmapa, recognized him as the reincarnation of the previous Shamarpa. In 1964, the 14th Shamar Rinpoche was officially enthroned in Karmapa's Rumtek monastery. At this occasion, the Karmapa wrote a poem:

The most exalted, the lord of the lands of snow is Avalokiteśvara.
The coalescence of his essence is the glorious Karmapa.
Inseparable from his three mysteries, in the manner of the three lords,
Is his manifestation, the great emanation; the majestic sun,
Whom I invest now sovereign of the practice lineage's order.
By the power of scattering auspicious flowers of excellent virtue,
Combined with the true words of the ṛiṣhi's truthfulness,
May he successfully and everlastingly be the sovereign of the order.

Shamar Rinpoche received the entire cycle of Kagyu teachings from the 16th Karmapa. He stayed close with the 16th Karmapa until his death in 1981.

Shamar Rinpoche was interested in the topic of Buddhism and democracy. His book "Creating a Transparent Democracy" lays out a framework for establishing a genuine democratic system of governance that promotes welfare and prosperity. He also founded the "Infinite Compassion Foundation" with the cause to promote the humane treatment of animals raised for consumption of meat and other products.

Shamar Rinpoche died on 11 June 2014 in Germany.

== See also ==
- Drikungpa
- Karmapa
