= Karmapa controversy =

Tibetan Buddhism tulku lineage dispute

Co-claimants to the title of 17th Karmapa

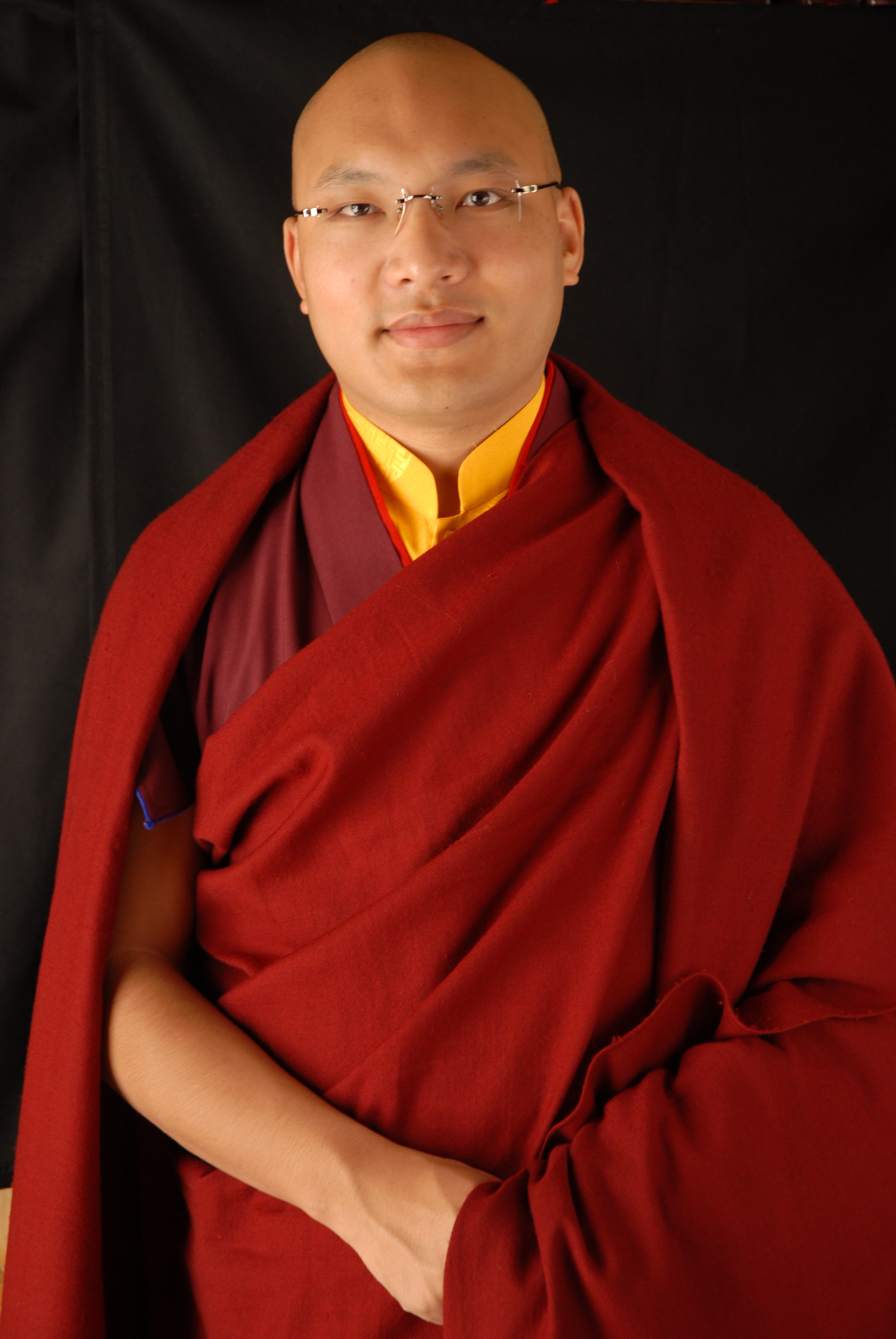
Ogyen Trinley Dorje

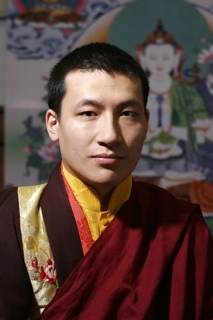
Trinley Thaye Dorje

There are currently two, separately enthroned 17th Gyalwang Karmapas: Ogyen Trinley Dorje and Trinley Thaye Dorje. The Karmapa is the spiritual leader of the nine-hundred-year-old Karma Kagyu lineage of the Kagyu school of Tibetan Buddhism.

Divisiveness started in the early and mid 1990s, with semi-public accusations of impropriety from those closely involved, and continued for several years thereafter. The recognition of the 17th Karmapa created a split within the Karma Kagyu lineage. Tai Situ Rinpoche recognized Ogyen Trinley Dorje as the 17th Karmapa, and the 14th Shamar Rinpoche disagreed and chose Trinley Thaye Dorje as the rightful claimant to the title of the 17th Karmapa. As the years passed, separate sets of organizations and highly recognized lamas, or teachers, supported one Karmapa or the other. Despite an intriguing history, the high lamas involved met on good terms and issued statements that they are confident there will be an amicable solution.

In 2018, Ogyen Trinley Dorje and Trinley Thaye Dorje met for the first time to begin creating a personal relationship with one another, and to encourage their spiritual communities to heal the divisions and join in efforts to help preserve the Karma Kagyu tradition. In 2020, Ogyen Trinley Dorje and Trinley Thaye Dorje jointly announced they would work together to find the next incarnation of the Shamar Rinpoche, historically considered second in importance to the Karma Kagyu lineage after the Gyalwang Karmapa, similar to the Panchen Lama's role as second in importance in the Gelug school after the Dalai Lama.

On December 4, 2023, Thaye Dorje and Ogyen Trinley Dorje released a statement that they would recognize the 15th Shamar Rinpoche together, as well as oversee his education, empowerments, and instructions. The two Karmapas asked all students of the Karma Kagyu to regret their past actions, and have the firm resolve to never split into factions again.

== Background ==
This is not the first controversy around a Karmapa incarnation. The recognitions of the Karmapa incarnations are of central importance in the Karma Kagyu lineage. The 8th, 10th, and 12th incarnations, as well as the widely renowned 16th Karmapa, experienced minor conflicts during their recognitions, each of which was ultimately resolved.

The 14th Shamar Rinpoche, nephew of the 16th Karmapa, traveled alongside him during his escape to Bhutan from Tibet. In 1964, the eight year old was granted permission by the Dalai Lama and the Tibetan Government-in-Exile to be officially recognized. With the 172-year ban on recognizing Shamarpa reincarnations lifted, Shamar Rinpoche reclaimed his place as senior student and deputy of the Karmapa. The ban had begun after the 10th Shamarpa was accused by members of the Karma Kagyu lineage of being a traitor, and of instigating the Sino-Nepalese War between Tibet and Nepal. The ban affected Shamar Rinpoche's lineage and supporting administration, but his enthronement in 1964 at the Rumtek Monastery allowed him back into his historical position as the second-ranking lama of the Karma Kagyu lineage, following the 16th Karmapa.

Incarnations like the 12th Shamarpa, son of the 15th Karmapa, enjoyed more leniency—but not official recognition—from the government thanks to the close personal relationship of that Karmapa and the 13th Dalai Lama.

The Karmapas traditionally predict their deliberately chosen rebirths, and prepare their predictions for their closest students so as to be located after birth. Although not strictly defined, the usual process to locate, recognize and enthrone a Karmapa incarnation was facilitated quietly by those previously close students, collaboratively and behind closed doors. Multiple judgements ensured harmony and continuity of the lineage. Among the collaborative participants, the Shamar Rinpoches have played an important role in confirming the identity of the Karmapas for several centuries. The Tai Situ Rinpoches and Goshir Gyaltsab Rinpoches have played similar roles, as the circumstances dictated.

The Shamar Rinpoches have had a hand in recognizing seven of the Karmapas and were often successors and teachers of the Karmapas—the relationship between the two has been characterized as being like father and son, or as brothers. The 5th Dalai Lama, for instance, affirmed the Karmapa and Shamarpa incarnations as having equal status, and in early texts the Shamarpa (Tibetan: ཞྭ་དམར་པ། Wylie: zhwa dmar pa, "red-hatted one") is referred to as the "Red Hat Karmapa". Upon his enthronement in 1964, the 14th Shamarpa was named by 16th Karmapa as his spiritual heir and was the senior-most lama of the lineage during the controversy. The Tai Situ Rinpoches and Gyaltsap Rinpoches have also had a close historical relationship with the Karmapas. The Tai Situ Rinpoches have identified — either independently or in conjunction with the Shamar or Gyaltsap Rinpoches — three of the Karmapa incarnations, and similarly, the Gyaltsap Rinpoches have helped identify four incarnations.

A prophecy was made by the 19th century Nyingma master, Chokgyur Lingpa, based a vision he had whereby Guru Rinpoche manifests as past and future Karmapas, and the minds of the 17th Karmapa and Tai Situ Rinpoche are "inseparably one" as they sit together under a "verdant tree on a rocky mountain". While disputing the interpretation of the prophecy, the Shamarpa, while supporting his selection of Trinley Thaye Dorje, maintained it could be reinterpreted to correspond to the 16th Karmapa and the 11th Tai Situ Rinpoche.

In Tibet, the 14th Dalai Lama's Gelug school historically had a strong political and spiritual-leadership role, which was tempered by the autonomy of the three other schools of Tibetan Buddhism—the Kagyu school, the Nyingma school and the Sakya school. The Nyingma school has always been non-political. In 1992, after Ogyen Trinley Dorje was located and recognized, the search committee, then led by Tai Situ Rinpoche, requested that the Dalai Lama bestow the Buktham Rinpoche seal, or the Buktham Letter, on the recognized 17th Gyalwang Karmapa. The seal was made official on 30 June 1992. Supporters of Ogyen Trinley Dorje maintain that the 14th Dalai Lama has the spiritual authority to recognize an incarnation of the Karmapa. The Karmapa lineage is the oldest tulku lineage in Tibetan Buddhism, predating the Dalai Lama lineage by more than two centuries. Followers of the Karma Kagyu lineage historically have considered themselves independent of the Dalai Lama's authority, and see the Karmapas as spiritually equal to the historical Buddha. Supporters of Trinley Thaye Dorje claim any previous involvement of the Dalai Lama and Tibetan government was merely a final stamp of approval following an individual monastery's (or lama's administration) independent decision.

Within the antireligious campaigns of the Chinese Communist Party is an ongoing directive to halt the recognition of high tulkus and control the naming of Dalai Lamas, Panchen Lamas, Karmapas, and Shamarpas, in order to gain spiritual and temporal control of Tibet and of Tibetan Buddhism. Official Beijing decrees were initiated in 1991, then revised as the State Religious Affairs Bureau Order No. 5, to outlaw the recognition of tulkus and lamas without China's state approvals. An ineffective lottery system was reported following the ban of the Shamarpas. In 1992, China tried another tactic which approved the 17th Karmapa's enthronement and posited its plan to eventually replace the 14th Dalai Lama with the 17th Karmapa.

In the centuries following the inception of the system used to identify reincarnate lamas (beginning in the 13th century with the second Karmapa), the process became increasingly corrupted and politicized by those living outside monastic-ordination systems, as the process also led indirectly to sources of material wealth and power in Tibet. Highly respected teachers like the 14th Dalai Lama and Shamar Rinpoche have bemoaned the practice as belonging to feudal times, and have advocated revamping the system in way that divorces the reincarnate teacher from administrative politics and allows them to distinguish themselves.

== History ==
Soon after the parinirvāṇa of the 16th Karmapa in 1981, a disagreement began brewing when head students of the Karmapa recounted opposing stories on what direction, and at whose feet, relics landed from the 16th Karmapa's funeral pyre. Years passed with no obvious clues of where to find the next incarnation, and the controversy came to the forefront when Shamar Rinpoche broke from the group of regents, claiming Tai Situ Rinpoche was not following protocol.

=== Initial search committee ===
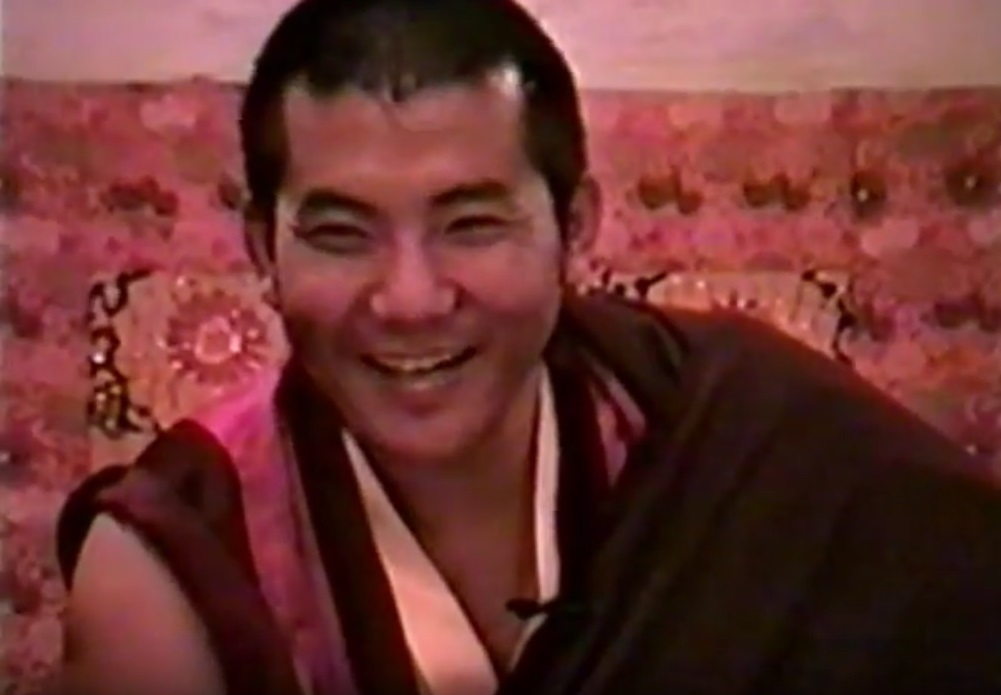
3rd Jamgon Kongtrul

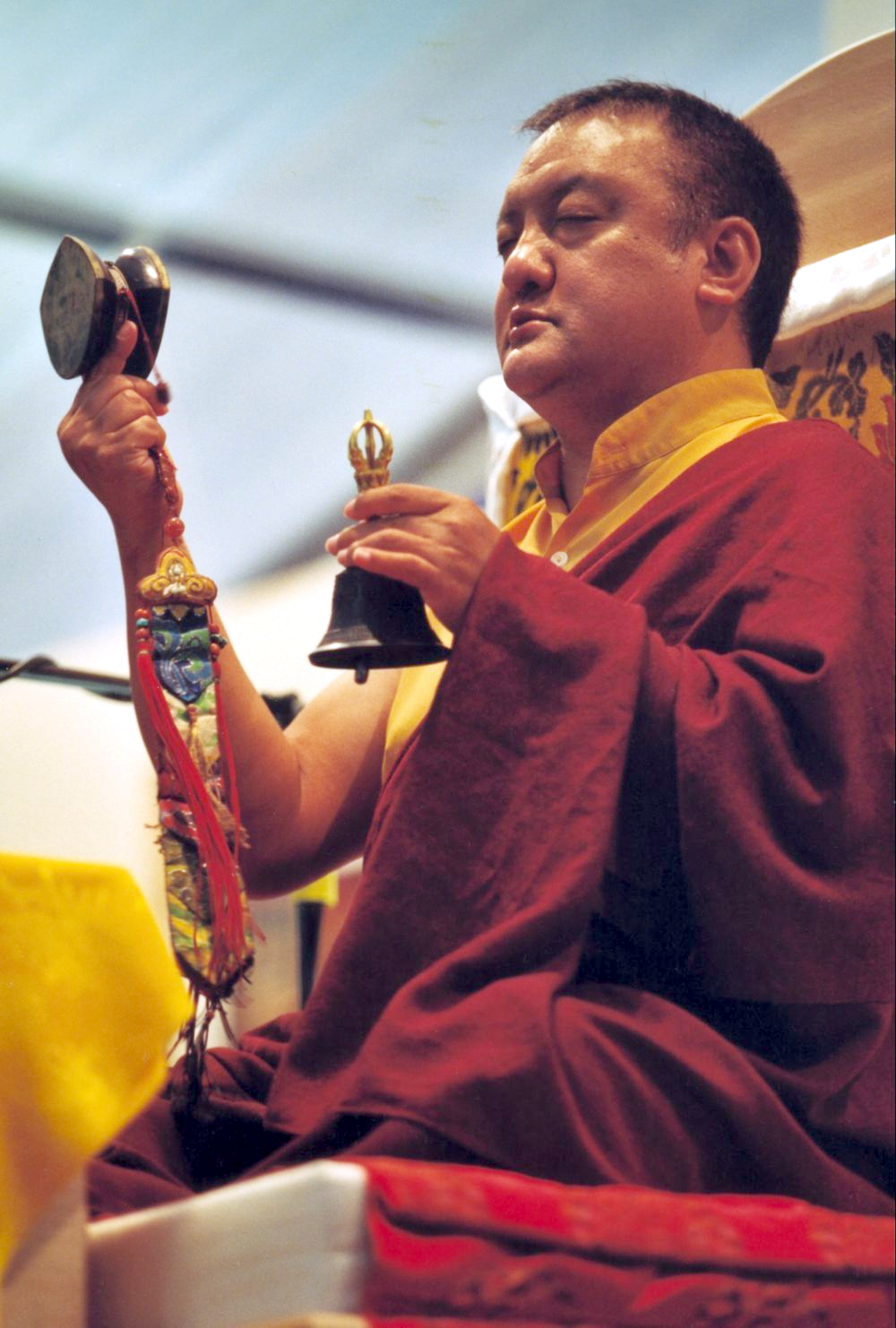
14th Kunzig Shamarpa

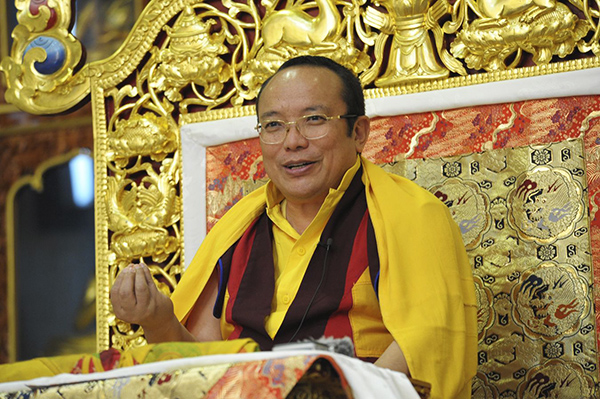
12th Tai Situpa

Following the parinirvāṇa of the 16th Karmapa in 1981, a regency of the four highest remaining members of the Karma Kagyu lineage at that time was formed to locate his rebirth:

- The 3rd Jamgon Kongtrul: lead regent, third-ranking spiritual leader
- The 14th Kunzig Shamar Rinpoche: second-ranking spiritual leader
- The 12th Tai Situpa: fourth-ranking spiritual leader
- The 12th Goshir Gyaltsap Rinpoche: fifth-ranking spiritual leader

This regency was officially dissolved by 1984, but the four rinpoches still referred to themselves as "regents" when the prediction letter was interpreted in 1992. As the collaborative group, they had the authority to recognize the next Karmapa. As years went by, the pressure to find the next incarnation of the Karmapa mounted.

=== Discovery of prediction letter ===
One central issue in the recognition of the 17th Karmapa was a prediction letter Tai Situ claimed was written by the 16th Karmapa. It indicated the parents, location, and year of the 17th Karmapa's rebirth.

In December 1980, ten months before the 16th Karmapa's parinirvāṇa, the 12th Tai Situpa maintained that the Karmapa gave him an amulet with a yellow-brocade cover, telling him, "This is your protection amulet. In the future, it will confer great benefit." Although Tai Situpa wore the locket on a gold chain for about a year after the Karmapa's death, he moved it to a side pocket, not realizing its significance or that it contained a message. Tai Situpa states that he followed an intuition to open the amulet and found in late 1990 the third prediction letter, inside an envelope marked "Open in the Metal Horse Year".

=== Shamar Rinpoche questions the letter's authenticity ===
Shamar Rinpoche questioned the authenticity of Tai Situ's prediction letter presented in 1992. He requested a forensic examination to prove or disprove its age and authorship. Shamar Rinpoche stated the inner letter appeared to be older than its outer envelope, and claimed the handwriting and grammar did not match that of the 16th Karmapa. Tai Situ rejected the idea of a scientific evaluation.

=== Recognizing the current Karmapa ===
Among tulkus of the Karma Kagyu lineage, the 7th Dzogchen Ponlop Rinpoche, the 9th Thrangu Rinpoche, Khenpo Tsultrim Gyamtso Rinpoche, the 7th Mingyur Rinpoche, and the 9th Traleg Kyabgon Rinpoche hold Ogyen Trinley Dorje to be the 17th Karmapa. Trinley Thaye Dorje has been recognized by Shamar Rinpoche, Lama Jigme Rinpoche, Topga Yulgyal Rinpoche, Lopon Tsechu Rinpoche, Sherab Gyaltsen Rinpoche, Khenchen Rinpoche Drupon Trinley Paljor, and the Fourth Trungram Gyaltrul Rinpoche.

The government of the People's Republic of China officially recognized Ogyen Trinley Dorje as the 17th Karmapa in 1992. The PRC has continued to recognize Ogyen Trinley Dorje as the Karmapa even after he departed Tibet and arrived in India in January 2000. Ogyen Trinley has been referred to as the 'Beijing Karmapa', due to the backing he receives from the government of the PRC. Trinley Thaye, meanwhile, is referred to as the 'Delhi Karmapa', due to his having the support of the government of India.

Chökyi Nyima Rinpoche said of his father, Tulku Urgyen Rinpoche, that "As far as my father was concerned, they were both to be respected and perceived with pure appreciation."

=== Court battle over Rumtek Monastery ===
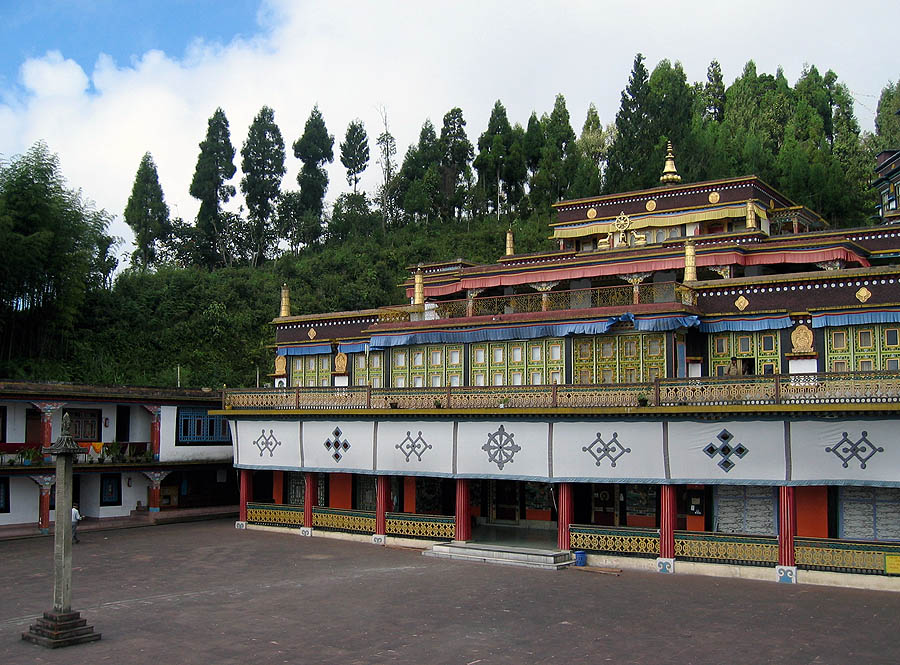
Rumtek Monastery

In 1982, Shamar Rinpoche and his cousin, Topga Yugyal, gained control of the estate at Rumtek Monastery a month after the 16th Karmapa's passing. Three monasteries in Bhutan were sold and control was gained over the Karmapa Charitable Trust, organized in 1961 by the 16th Karmapa. Disagreements over the Shamarpa's and Topga's financial dealings began in 1988.

Ogyen Trinley Dorje's followers maintain that the trust was established solely for the sake of seeing to the welfare of the Karmapa's followers, providing funds for the maintenance of the monastery, and for the monks' medical fees. The administration of the monastery was the responsibility of the Tsurphu Labrang, which was organized as a legal entity for a related case.

=== Ogyen Trinley escapes Tibet in 1999 ===
In late 1999, fourteen-year-old Ogyen Trinley Dorje decided that the restrictions placed on him by the PRC government at Tsurphu limited his ability to teach his disciples and receive teachings from lineage masters. He escaped over the Himalayas in the middle of winter, evading Chinese authorities and making his way through Nepal and on to Dharamsala, India, arriving on January 5, 2000.

=== Ogyen Trinley Dorje meeting with Shamar Rinpoche in 2007 ===
Ogyen Trinley Dorje requested to meet Shamar Rinpoche, and asked to arrange a personal meeting with him. The two met in the Oberoi International Hotel in New Delhi on 9 January 2007.

Shamar Rinpoche had declined the first invitation in 2005, which was received by telephone call from Drikung Chetsang Rinpoche, due to obstacles from some politicians based in Sikkim. According to Dawa Tsering, spokesperson for the administration of Shamar Rinpoche, "He (Urgyen Trinley Dorje) was confident that this meeting would bring peace in the Kagyu School in general and thus help in flourishing Buddha Dharma. This meeting has created a basis to re-unite all in the Dharma Sangha. Therefore, such an initiative should be appreciated by all."

To underscore his willingness to be supportive, Shamar Rinpoche even provided the necessary help for Ogyen Trinley Dorje to obtain Indian government approval for a visit to the US, though at the same time maintained the stance that Trinley Thaye Dorje is the authentic Karmapa."

=== Dalai Lama and Shamar Rinpoche meet in 2010 ===
The Dalai Lama and Shamar Rinpoche met on 13 August 2010 at the Dalai Lama's residence to discuss ways of ending the controversy. The Shamarpa wrote, "Although this matter is not easily resolved, since it is connected to the politics of China and India as well, with His Holiness Dalai Lama's blessing and support I am confident that there will be an amicable solution, which will be beneficial for the Karma Kagyü lineage, as well as for Tibetan Buddhism in general."

=== India accuses Ogyen Trinley Dorje of being a Chinese spy in 2011 ===
In February 2011, Ogyen Trinley Dorje was accused of being a Chinese spy by government officials of the Indian state of Himachal Pradesh, allegations which the Karmapa denied. India's intelligence report is said to have been lacking sufficient evidence. Money in the amount of one million dollars cash—some of the money in Chinese yuan—found in his monastery was later deemed to be legitimate donations.

=== Ogyen Trinley Dorje's travel restrictions lifted in 2011 ===
Ogyen Trinley Dorje's ability to travel had been restricted since 2000. Narendra Modi's government coming into power changed dynamics towards the Karmapa case. In March 2011, the Indian central government lifted some of the travel restrictions on Ogyen Trinley Dorje, allowing him to travel out of Dharamsala.

In May 2015, Karmapa travelled to the United Kingdom from India. By then, the Modi government lifted all travel restrictions placed by the previous government, except to Rumtek Monastery in Sikkim.

=== Trinley Thaye Dorje weds in 2017 ===
On 29 March 2017, Trinley Thaye Dorje announced his plans to marry his friend, thirty-six-year-old Rinchen Yangzom, born in Bhutan. The announcement also mentioned he would no longer be performing ordination ceremonies, which are limited to holders of certain vows.

Trinley Thaye Dorje is not the first Karmapa to marry and have children. The 10th Karmapa fathered several sons and daughters. One of his sons, Norbu Zangpo, was recognized as the Sixth Tsurpu Gyeltsap. For his part, the 15th Karmapa composed a text on how to "return one's vows" (cease to be a monk) properly. As a Tertön, he had numerous consorts; his children included Khyentsé Özer, who was recognised as the Second Jamgon Kongtrul, and Jamyang Rinpoché, an unrecognised Shamarpa.

== Reconciliation ==
=== Ogyen Trinley Dorje announces break from Dharma activities in 2018 ===
In March 2018, Ogyen Trinley Dorje published a video on his official YouTube channel. It was translated by official translator David Karma Choephel. In the video he sets the course for a temporary break from his activities. He proclaims his personal doubt of being as skilled as the previous Karmapas and asks the community to reconcile the division of the Karma Kagyu Lineage.

=== The two Karmapas meet in 2018 ===
In early October 2018, Ogyen Trinley Dorje and Trinley Thaye Dorje met for a few days at a rural location in France. On October 11, they issued a joint statement that the two Karmapa candidates would work together to heal the divisions that split the Karma Kagyu lineage.

This undertaking is critically important for the future of the Karma Kagyu lineage as well as for the future of Tibetan Buddhism and the benefit of all sentient beings. We therefore ask everyone within the Karma Kagyu community to join us in our efforts to strengthen and preserve our lineage. We view it as our collective responsibility to restore harmony to our tradition which is a lineage of wisdom and compassion.

=== Joint prayers and statements ===
On 20 October 2019, Thinley Thaye Dorje and Orgyen Thinley Dorje announced that they had together composed a long-life prayer for the 15th Shamarpa, and published its text in both Tibetan and an English translation.

On December 4, 2023, Thaye Dorje and Ogyen Trinley Dorje wrote a joint statement, that they would recognize the 15th Shamar Rinpoche together, as well as oversee his education, empowerments and instructions. They said the responsibility had fallen on both of them, that they had met several times over this issue, and they will not accept interference from any uninvolved parties.
