= Karma Kagyu =

School of Tibetan Buddhism

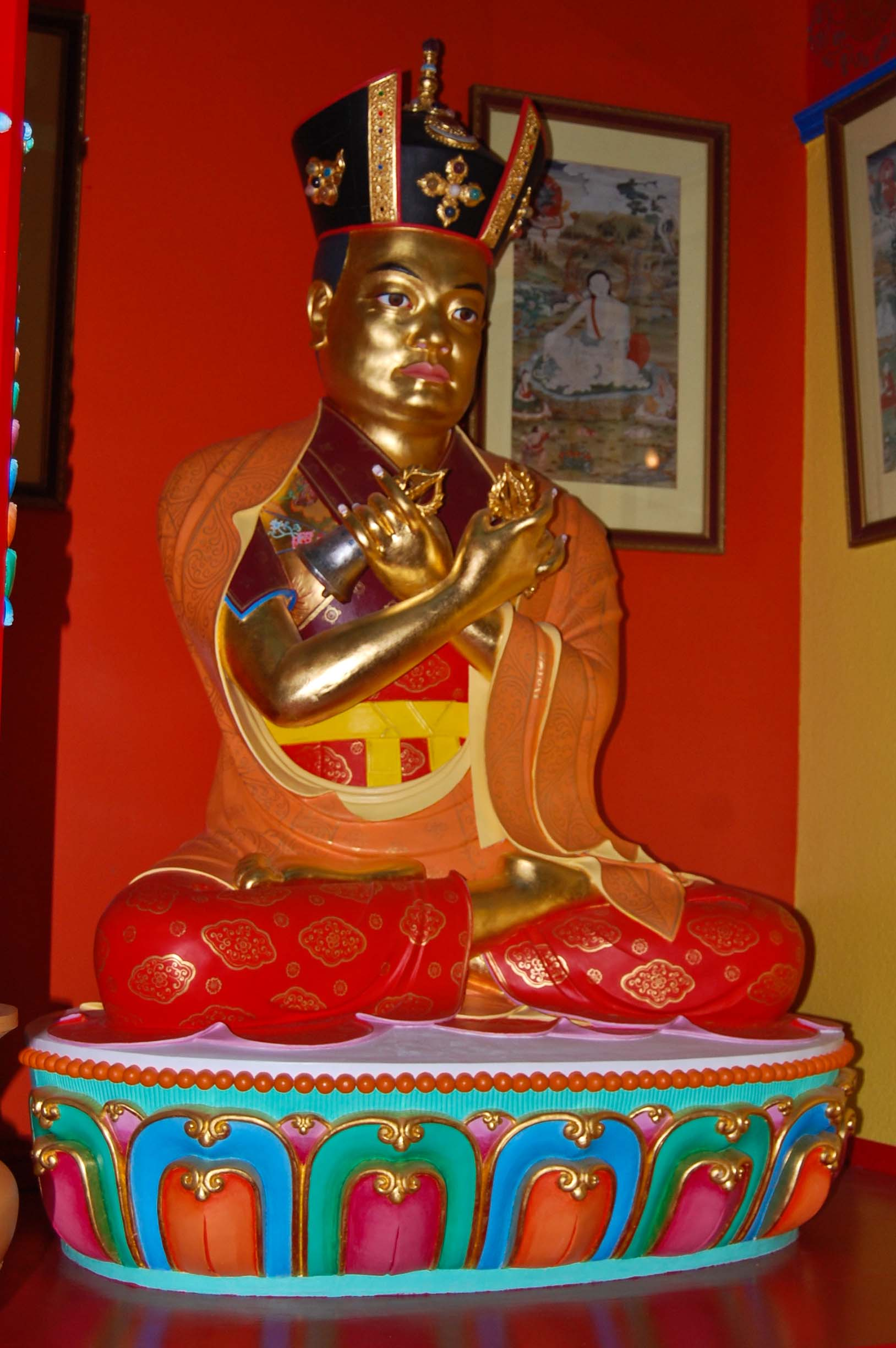
Statue of the 16th Karmapa at Samye Ling, Scotland, wearing the famed "black crown" of the Karmapas, the traditional heads of the Karma Kagyu lineage

Karma Kagyu (Tibetan: ཀརྨ་བཀའ་བརྒྱུད, Wylie: karma bka'-brgyud), or Kamtsang Kagyu (Tibetan: ཀརྨ་ཀཾ་ཚང་, Wylie: kar+ma kaM tshang), is a widely practiced and probably the second-largest lineage within the Kagyu school, one of the four major schools of Tibetan Buddhism. The lineage has long-standing monasteries in Tibet, China, Russia, Mongolia, India, Nepal and Bhutan, with current centres in over 60 countries. The spiritual head of the Karma Kagyu is the Gyalwa Karmapa; the 2nd among the 10 Karmapas had been the principal spiritual advisors to successive emperors of China. The Karma Kagyu are sometimes called the "Black Hat" lamas, in reference to the Black Crown worn by the Karmapa.

The Kagyu lineage claims a continuity of oral instructions transmitted from master to disciple. This emphasis is reflected in the literal meaning of Kagyu. The first syllable, ka, is said to refer to the texts of Buddha's teachings and to the master's verbal instructions. Ka has the double meaning of the enlightened meaning imparted by a teacher's words, as well as the strength that such words of insight may bear. The second syllable, gyu, means lineage or tradition. The combination of these syllables thus means "the line of orally transmitted instructions." The elders in the Kagyu lineage, representing the theoretically uninterrupted line of masters and disciples reaching back to Buddha (Vajradhara), are jointly known as the "Golden Rosary".

== Origins ==
The Karma Kagyu was founded by Düsum Khyenpa, 1st Karmapa Lama. It is headed by the Karmapa; followers believe that the Karmapa's appearance as the first historical consciously reincarnate lama (tulku) was predicted by Gautama Buddha in the Samadhiraja Sutra.

== Teaching and practice ==
The Karma Kagyu school belongs to the Vajrayana branch of Mahayana Buddhism. It conceives itself as a member of the third turning of the dharmacakra and participates in the Rimé movement. Important teachings of the Kagyu school include the Buddhist philosophical traditions of Yogacara and Madhyamaka, as well as the tantric tradition of Chakrasamvara, among others.

The view known as Shentong (empty of other) has become popular in Karma Kagyu, due to its promotion by the influential Rimé philosopher Jamgön Kongtrül Lodrö Thayé (1813–1899). This Shentong view has been upheld by various modern Kagyu masters such as Kalu Rinpoche and Khenpo Tsultrim Gyamtso Rinpoche. However, as noted by Karl Brunnhölzl, several important Kagyu figures have disagreed with the view of "Shentong Madhyamaka", such as Mikyö Dorje the 8th Karmapa Lama (1507–1554) and Pawo Tsuglag Threngwa, the second Pawo Rinpoche, both of whom see "Shentong" as another name for Yogacara and as a separate system to Madhyamaka. Both of these figures, as well as the Ninth Karmapa, Wangchuk Dorje, criticized the Shentong view and held that the teachings on Buddha nature were of expedient meaning.

The central yogic practice of the Karma Kagyu is the doctrine of Mahamudra, also known as the "Great Seal". This doctrine focuses on four principal stages of meditative practice (the Four Yogas of Mahamudra):

- The development of single-pointedness of mind,
- The transcendence of all conceptual elaboration,
- The cultivation of the perspective that all phenomena are of a "single taste", and
- The fruition of the path, which is beyond any contrived acts of meditation.

It is through these four stages of development that the practitioner is said to attain the perfect realization of mahamudra. Mahamudra is practiced both independently and as the completion stage of Vajrayana practice.

Within the Karma Kagyu, meditative practice is almost invariably presented in a progressive manner. Early practice includes samatha, introduction to Buddhist history and philosophy and initiation into the lower tantras - classically across the iṣṭadevatās (Wylie: yi dam) Avalokiteśvara, Tārā and Amitābha. This is followed by ngöndro and vipassanā. During the traditional three-year retreat, retreatants usually focus their practice on the Six Yogas of Naropa. At the Anuttarayoga Tantra level of practice, the principal iṣṭadevatās of the lineage are Dorje Pakmo, Hevajra and Cakrasaṃvara.

== Lamas ==
The supreme lama of the Karma Kagyu is the Karmapa, who always presides as lineage holder once he has reached his majority and received all the necessary training and dharma transmissions. From the death of one Karmapa until the next takes his seat as lineage holder, one (or more) of the previous Karmapa's principal disciples holds the lineage. Rangjung Rigpe Dorje, 16th Karmapa left the lineage in the hands of four eminent lamas: the 14th Shamarpa, the 12th Tai Situpa, the 3rd Jamgon Kongtrul and the 12th Goshir Gyaltsab. There is controversy over who is the 17th Karmapa, with two major candidates both having been recognized and enthroned by their supporters. Neither candidate has been enthroned at Rumtek Monastery. But the Ogyen Trinley Dorje, 17th Karmapa, having been recognized by Tai Situ Rinpoche and Goshir Gyaltsab Rinpoche, was formally enthroned at Tsurphu Monastery, the traditional seat of the successive Karmapas.

The direct master-disciple transmission of the lineage holders of the Karma Kagyu is known as the Golden Rosary of Kagyu Fathers. They are:

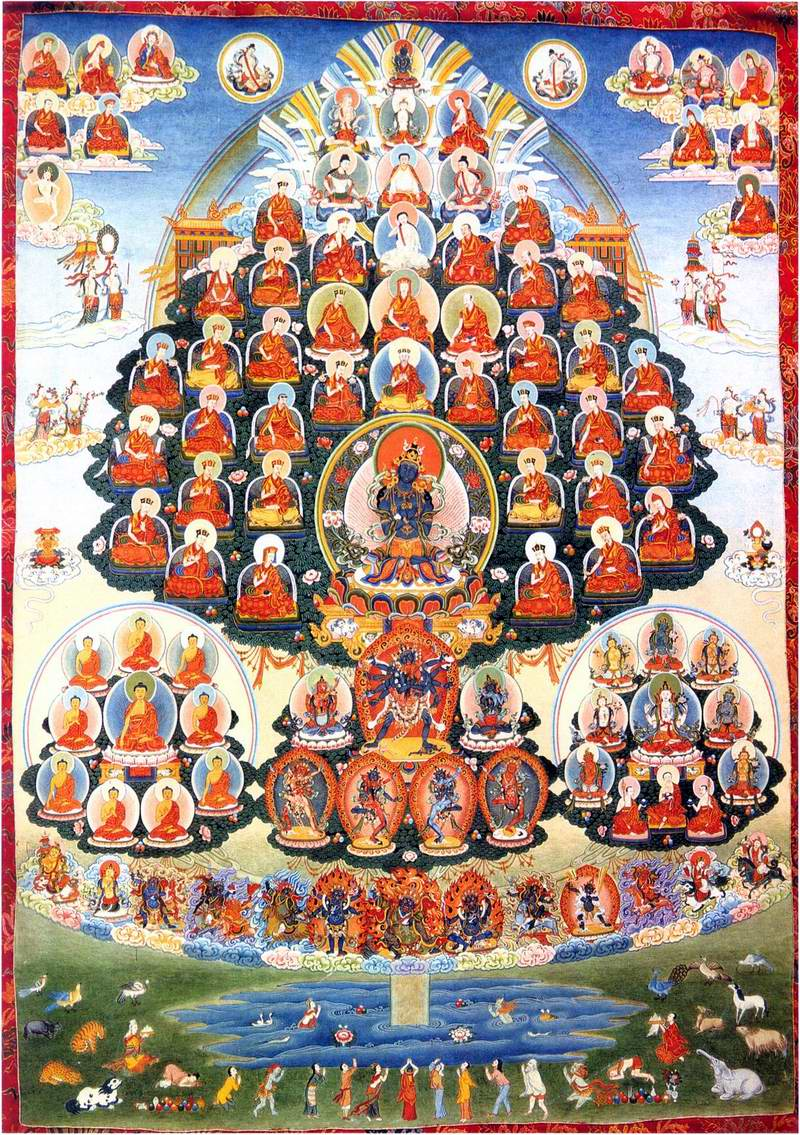
Painted thangka of the Karma Kagyu Refuge Tree, showing lineage holders. Source website has clickable links identifying each figure.

1. Vajradhara (Tib. Dorje Chang)
2. Tilopa, 989–1069 CE
3. Naropa, 1016–1100 CE
4. Marpa, 1012–1097 CE
5. Milarepa, 1040–1123 CE
6. Gampopa, 1079–1153 CE
7. Düsum Khyenpa, 1st Karmapa Lama, 1110–1193 CE
8. Drogon Rechen, 1148–1219 CE
9. Pomdrakpa, 1170–1249 CE
10. Karma Pakshi, 2nd Karmapa Lama, 1204–1283 CE
11. Orgyenpa, 1230–1312 CE
12. Rangjung Dorje, 3rd Karmapa Lama, 1284–1339 CE
13. Yungtön Dorjepel, 1296–1376 CE
14. Rolpe Dorje, 4th Karmapa Lama, 1340–1383
15. 2nd Shamarpa, Khacho Wangpo, 1350–1405 CE
16. Deshin Shekpa, 5th Karmapa Lama, 1384–1415 CE
17. Ratnabhadra (dates unknown)
18. Thongwa Dönden, 6th Karmapa Lama, 1416–1453 CE
19. Jampal Zangpo, 1427–1489 CE
20. Paljor Dondrup, 1st Goshir Gyaltsab, 1427–1489 CE
21. Chödrak Gyatso, 7th Karmapa Lama, 1454–1506 CE
22. 1st Sangye Nyenpa Rinpoche, Tashi Paljor, 1457–1525 CE
23. Mikyö Dorje, 8th Karmapa Lama, 1507–1554 CE
24. 5th Shamarpa, Kongchok Yanglak, 1526–1583 CE
25. Wangchuk Dorje, 9th Karmapa Lama, 1555–1603 CE
26. 6th Shamarpa, Chokyi Wangchuk, 1584–1629 CE
27. Chöying Dorje, 10th Karmapa, 1604–1674 CE
28. 7th Shamarpa, Yeshe Nyingpo, 1631–1694 CE
29. Yeshe Dorje, 11th Karmapa, 1676–1702 CE
30. 8th Shamarpa, Chokyi Dondrup, 1695–1732 CE
31. Changchub Dorje, 12th Karmapa Lama, 1703–1732 CE
32. 8th Tai Situpa, Chokyi Jungney, 1699–1774 CE
33. Dudul Dorje, 13th Karmapa Lama, 1733–1797 CE
34. 10th Shamarpa, Mipham Chodrub Gyatso, 1742–1793 CE
35. 9th Situpa, Pema Nyinche Wangpo, 1774–1853 CE
36. Thekchok Dorje, 14th Karmapa Lama, 1798–1868 CE
37. Jamgon Kongtrul, 1813–1899 CE
38. Khakyab Dorje, 15th Karmapa Lama, 1871–1922 CE
39. 11th Situpa, Pema Wangchuk Gyalpo, 1886–1953 CE
40. 2nd Jamgon Rinpoche, Palden Khyentse Oser, 1904–1953 CE
41. Rangjung Rigpe Dorje, 16th Karmapa, 1924–1981 CE

Because of the Karmapa controversy, the identities of the next lineage holders have not been definitively identified. In all likelihood, they are either:

42. 12th Situpa, Pema Tönyö Nyinje, 1954–present CE
43. 17th Karmapa, Ogyen Trinley Dorje, 1985–present CE

or

42. 14th Shamarpa, Mipham Chokyi Lodro, 1952–2014 CE
43. 17th Karmapa, Trinley Thaye Dorje, 1983–present CE

At the next level of precedence, all Kagyu Lamas who have been accorded the title Rinpoche (Lit: precious one) are highly regarded as trustworthy teachers. Those who hold the Khenpo degree have completed the equivalent of a doctorate in Buddhist studies.

There are (both currently and historically) many female Kagyu Lamas. For example, in the Refuge Tree pictured above, two of the figures floating in the sky above the tree (dakini Sukhasiddhi and Machig Labdrön) are great historical female Lamas of the lineage. Mindrolling Jetsün Khandro Rinpoche is a living female tulku of the Karma Kagyu. Probably the most well-known active female Kagyu Lamas in the West are Ani Pema Chödrön and Tsultrim Allione.
