= Katok Tsewang Norbu =

Teacher of the Nyingma school of Tibetan Buddhism

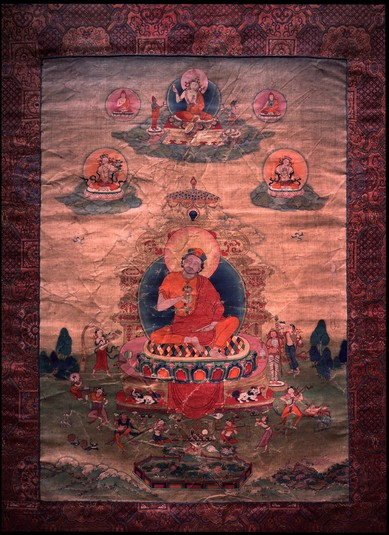
- Katok Tsewang Norbu
- Title: Tertön

Personal life
- Born: 1698
- Died: 1755 (aged 56–57)
- Other name: Katok Rigdzin Tsewang Norbu

Religious life
- Religion: Tibetan Buddhism
- School: Nyingma

Senior posting
- Teacher: the 12th Karmapa
- Students: Situ Panchen, the 12th Karmapa and the 13th Karmapa

Katok Rigdzin Tsewang Norbu (Tibetan: ཀཿ་ཐོག་ཚེ་དབང་ནོར་བུ, Wylie: ka' thog tshe dbang nor bu, 1698–1755) was a teacher of the Nyingma school of Tibetan Buddhism who notably championed the shentong (Wylie: gzhan stong) or "empty of other" view first popularised by the Jonang school. He also examined the Chan Buddhist teachings of Hashang Mahayana, known as Moheyan. Despite the shentong view being banned as heretical, he successfully taught and cultivated its teachings as a legitimate view of the Nyingma school.

Sonam Deutsen offered to enthrone Rigdzin Tsewang Norbu, when he was 24 years of age, as the Rinpoche of Katok Monastery, but he declined and said he preferred his life as a "vagabond". His seat remained at the Katok Monastery of Tibet.

== Scholarly impact ==
Katok Tsewang Norbu's interests spanned many of the important Nyingma and Kagyu teachings of Tibetan Buddhism, and Bon, including several not associated with the Nyingma schools:

Katog Tsewang Norbu (1698-1755) was the head of Katog monastery, and ranks as one of the most impressive scholars of eighteenth-century Tibet. His studies took in both the texts of the Nyingma and those of the new schools; he exchanged Nyingma for Kagyü teachings with the Twelfth Karmapa, Jangchub Dorjé (1703-1732), and wrote a history of the transmission of Mahāmudrā. Tsewang Norbu studied and championed the forbidden Jonang doctrines, writing several works on the "empty of other" (gzhan stong) theory and on the Kālacakra tantra, the source of "empty of other" in the tantric corpus. He also wrote some non-religious works on history and geography and travelled widely, making several journeys to Nepal.

His interest in Chan followed its "defeat" as a teaching in Tibet at the famous 8th century Samye Monastery debate, after which there was even a Cham dance ridiculing Chan, Hashang Mahayana. His interest may have been spurred, according to van Schaik, by Gelug criticism of Nyingma teachings such as Dzogchen as well as against other "simultaneist" teachings of the Sarma schools.

== Shentong ==
After the suppression of the Jonang school, its scholars and its texts and the work of the Sakya scholar Serdok Penchen Sakya Chokden (Wylie: gser mdog pan chen sa kya mchog ldan, 1428–1507) by the 5th Dalai Lama and the Gelug religio-political establishment in the 17th century, shentong views were propagated mainly by Karma Kagyu and Nyingma teachers. In particular, Situ Panchen, the 8th Tai Situpa (1700–1774), and Katok Tsewang Norbu were very instrumental in reviving Shentong among their sects. Katok Tsewang Norbu was the Situ Panchen's teacher, but it was the latter who had a lasting effect on the larger Tibetan Buddhist community. "In the end it would be Situ more than anyone who would create the environment for the widespread acceptance of the Zhentong theories in the next century." This revival was continued by Jamgon Kongtrul, a 19th-century Rimé movement scholar and a teacher of shentong. More recently, the Kagyu Rinpoches Kalu Rinpoche and Khenpo Tsultrim Gyamtso Rinpoche also taught the shentong view.
