= Rangtong and shentong =

Doctrine within Tibetan Buddhism

Rangtong and shentong are two distinctive views on emptiness (sunyata) and the two truths doctrine within Tibetan Buddhism.

'Rangtong' (Wylie: rang stong; "empty of self-nature") is a philosophical term in Tibetan Buddhism which is used by Tibetan defenders of shentong, like Dölpopa, to distinguish the majority Madhyamaka teaching on the nature of śūnyatā or "emptiness", namely that all phenomenon are empty of an enduring and/or unchanging essence or "self," and that this emptiness is not an absolute reality, but a mere nominal characterisation of phenomena. It is related to the prasangika approach, which argues that no positive statements should be made to deconstruct the notion of inherent existence, but only arguments which show the logical implications and absurdity of statements. This position is the mainstream Gelugpa interpretation of Madhyamaka, one of the main Mahayana schools, which dominates Vajrayana Buddhism.

Shentong (Wylie: gzhan stong, "emptiness of other") refers to a range of views held by different Tibetan Buddhist figures. Classic Jonang shentong holds that while all relative phenomena are empty of inherent existence (svabhava), ultimate reality (paramartha-satya) is not empty of its own inherent existence. In this view, ultimate reality, the buddha-wisdom (buddha-jñana) or buddha-nature (buddhadhātu), is only empty of relative and defiled phenomena, but it is not empty of its countless awakened qualities. The classic shentong view was developed and defended by the Jonang school of Tibetan Buddhism, especially by the great scholar Dölpopa Shérap Gyeltsen (1292–1361). The view also has precursors in some Indian Buddhist works, such as the Ratnagotravibhāga and the writings of Indian figures like Ratnākaraśānti and Sajjana.

Jonang shentong later influenced the views of various figures in the other schools of Tibetan Buddhism, like Sakya Chokden and Situ Panchen, becoming popular in various lineages. The shentong view was officially banned by Gelug authorities in the 17th century, due to political and doctrinal conflicts with the Jonang school, and shentong texts were sometimes destroyed in this period. After this period of suppression, various shentong views were propagated mainly by Jonang, Kagyu and Nyingma lamas. The 19th century saw a revival of shentong, particularly within the non-sectarian Rimé movement. Nowadays, classic shentong remains the main philosophical theory of the Jonang school, and various other forms of shentong are also taught by some lamas of the Kagyu, Sakya, and Nyingma schools.

== Etymology ==
Shentong (Tibetan: གཞན་སྟོང་, Wylie: gzhan stong, Lhasa dialect: [ɕɛ̃̀tṍŋ], also transliterated zhäntong or zhentong; literally "other-emptiness") is a Tibetan Buddhist philosophical view. It applies the Mahayana theory of emptiness in a specific way. While shentong sees relative reality as empty of self-nature, it argues that absolute reality (paramarthasatya) (Note: According to Hookham, non-dual experience is Ultimate Reality.) is a positive "non-dual buddhajñana" (Note: According to Hookham, "The Chinese Tathagarba schools describe Buddhajnana as the totality of all that is, which pervades every part of all that is in its totality." According to Hookham, for Shentong Buddhajnana is "the non-dual nature of Mind completely unobscured and endowed with its countless Buddha Qualities (Buddhagunas).) which is only "empty" (Wylie: stong) of "other," (Wylie: gzhan) relative phenomena (dharmas). This positive ultimate reality (the buddha-nature, tathagatagarbha, or Dharmadhatu) is not empty of its own nature, and is thus "truly existing."

Another English translation of shentong is "extrinsic emptiness." Shentong was also called "Great Mādhyamaka" (dbu ma chen po), a term which has also been used by other figures to refer to their Madhyamaka views, like Longchenpa and Mipham.

The term rangtong (Tibetan: རང་སྟོང་, Wylie: rang stong; "empty of self-nature") was coined by shentong theorist Dolpopa Sherab Gyaltsen, who used the term "shentong" to characterise his own teachings and "rangtong" to refer to the teachings he saw as lesser to shentong. Rangtong generally refers to the Madhyamaka view which holds that all phenomena are empty of self (Atman), i.e., no-self (Anattā), and inherent nature (Svabhava) and that this emptiness is not an absolute reality, but a mere nominal designation.

== Rangtong ==
Rangtong is the majority Tibetan teaching on the nature of śūnyatā or "emptiness", namely that all phenomena are empty of a self-nature in both the relative and absolute sense, without positing anything beyond that. This position is the mainstream Tibetan interpretation of Madhyamaka, especially by the followers of Prasaṅgika Mādhyamaka

Tsongkhapa (1357–1419), who also wrote in response to shentong, is the most outspoken defendant of rangtong. He saw emptiness as a consequence of pratītyasamutpāda (dependent arising), the teaching that no dharma ("thing") has an existence of its own, but always comes into existence in dependence on other dharmas.

Tsongkhapa's view on "ultimate reality" is condensed in the sort text In Praise of Dependent Arising c.q. In Praise of Relativity c.q. The Essence of Eloquency. It states that "things" do exist conventionally, but ultimately everything is dependently arisen, and therefore void of inherent existence:

Whatever depends on causes and conditions
Is empty of intrinsic reality
What excellent instruction could there be
More marvellous than this discovery?

This means that conventionally things do exist, and that there is no use in denying that. But it also means that ultimately those things have no 'existence of their own', and that cognizing then as such results from cognitive operations, not from some unchangeable essence. Tsongkhapa:

Since objects do not exist through their own nature, they are established as existing through the force of convention.

It also means that there is no "transcendental ground," and that "ultimate reality" has no existence of its own, but is the negation of such a transcendental reality, and the impossibility of any statement on such an ultimately existing transcendental reality: it is no more than a fabrication of the mind. Susan Kahn further explains:

Ultimate truth does not point to a transcendent reality, but to the transcendence of deception. It is critical to emphasize that the ultimate truth of emptiness is a negational truth. In looking for inherently existent phenomena it is revealed that it cannot be found. This absence is not findable because it is not an entity, just as a room without an elephant in it does not contain an elephantless substance. Even conventionally, elephantlessness does not exist. Ultimate truth or emptiness does not point to an essence or nature, however subtle, that everything is made of.

== History of shentong ==
=== Indian origin and sources ===
The notion of shentong grew out of various Indian and Tibetan doctrinal discussions on the topics of Madhyamaka, Yogacara, and the theory of Buddha-nature.

Shentong adherents generally trace the shentong view back to India, pointing to numerous Indian sources, ranging from early suttas like the Cula-suññata Sutta to the tathagatagarbha sutras, a group of treatises variously attributed jointly to Asanga and Maitreya (especially the Ratnagotravibhāga), and a body of praises attributed to Nāgārjuna (the "Four Hymns" and the Dharmadhātustava). The Ratnagotravibhāga's statement that "the true end is void of conditioned phenomena in all aspects" is a key source for shentong reasoning. The same text also contains a key passage which states: "the basic element is empty of what is adventitious, which has the characteristic of being separable. It is not empty of the unsurpassable attributes, which have the characteristic of being inseparable."

In developing the shentong view, Dolpopa draws on several Indian Mahayana sutras which he considered to be of definitive meaning (Sanskrit: nītārtha) including: Tathāgatagarbha sūtra, Avikalpapraveśa dhāraṇī (Dharani for Entering the Nonconceptual), Śrīmālādevī Siṃhanāda Sūtra, Mahābherīsūtra (Sutra of the Great Drum), Aṅgulimālīya Sūtra, Tathāgatamahākaruṇānirdeśasūtra (Sutra Presenting the Great Compassion of the Tathagata, also known as the Dhāraṇīśvararāja), Mahāmegha sūtra (Sutra of the Great Cloud), the Mahāyāna Mahāparinirvāṇa Sūtra, the "Maitreya Chapter" (found in two versions of the Tibetan Large Prajñaparamita), the Pañcaśatikāprajñāpāramitā (Perfection of Wisdom in 500 Lines), the Saṃdhinirmocanasūtra, the Laṅkāvatāra Sūtra, and the Buddhāvataṃsakasūtra.

Karl Brunnhölzl notes that several Indian sources contain a view similar to shentong. This view is an alternate interpretation of the yogacara model of the three natures which states that the perfected nature is empty of both the imaginary nature and the dependent nature. This view is found in the Bṛhaṭṭīkā (a Prajñāpāramitā commentary which comments on the 'Maitreya Chapter' in the Large Prajñāpāramitāsūtra), the Bhagavatyāmnāyānusāriṇī (a commentary on the Aṣṭasāhasrikā), as well as in some texts by Ratnākaraśānti, which also state that the perfected nature is the buddha-nature.

The Bṛhaṭṭīkā states that the perfected nature (here called dharmata-form) is empty of the dependent nature (here called "what is conceived") and the imaginary nature:

Here, what is the perfect [nature] - dharmata-form - [is empty of] characteristics such as existing as imaginary form and is empty of the form that appears as the aspect of an object that is conceived as form. It is therefore that it is called "empty."

Furthermore, the Bṛhaṭṭīkā states that "being empty means being devoid of what is other" (*pararahita; gzhan bral). The Prajñāpāramitā commentaries like the Bṛhaṭṭīkā also state that the perfected nature is a naturally luminous mind which is unchanging, and free of adventitious stains. Brunnhölzl also writes that Jñānaśrīmitra's Sākārasiddhiśāstra also promotes similar ideas.

Another Indian source, Sajjana's Mahāyānottaratantraśāstropadeśa, a commentary on the Ratnagotravibhāga, states:

[Beings are endowed with] the heart of a tathāgata, because the disposition for the [tathāgata] exists [in them]. The suchness of the dhātu is devoid of what is afflicted—the dependent (paratantra).

According to Jamgon Kongtrul's Treasury of Knowledge, shentong is associated with the "third wheel" of Dharma, the highest intention of the Buddha, which can be found in various Indian sources like the treatises of Maitreya (Dharmadharmatāvibhāga and Ratnagotravibhāga) and some of Nāgārjuna's hymns. Kongtrul traces the lineage of the third wheel of Dharma through Indian figures like Asaṅga, Vasubandhu, Dharmapāla (530-561), Candragomī, Ratnākaraśānti, Maitrīpa and his student Vajrapāṇi, who wrote a commentary on Maitrīpa's Tattvadaśaka (Ten Stanzas on True Reality). This lineage was transmitted to Tibet by Ānandakīrti and Sajjana, through Ngog Lotsāwa (1059–1109), Su Gawé Dorje, Dsen Kawoché, and entered the Kagyu tradition through Gampopa and Padampa Sangyé.

=== Development in Tibet ===
In the Jonang tradition of Kālacakra, Yumo Mikyö Dorje is considered the key founder of shentong in Tibet. Jonang histories state he was a Kashmiri pandit and a student of a siddha named Candranātha. The only surviving texts of this figure are his "Four Lucid Lamps", which focus on the six-branch yoga of Kālacakra. In his Lamps, Dorje discusses the visible forms of emptiness (śūnyatā-bimba) seen during the Kālacakra yogas. To him, these forms reveal emptiness as a "path" that can be perceived, affirmed, and engaged with, compared to emptiness as a "view" which is a purely intellectual negation that cannot be perceived and engaged with, and is thus of lesser value.

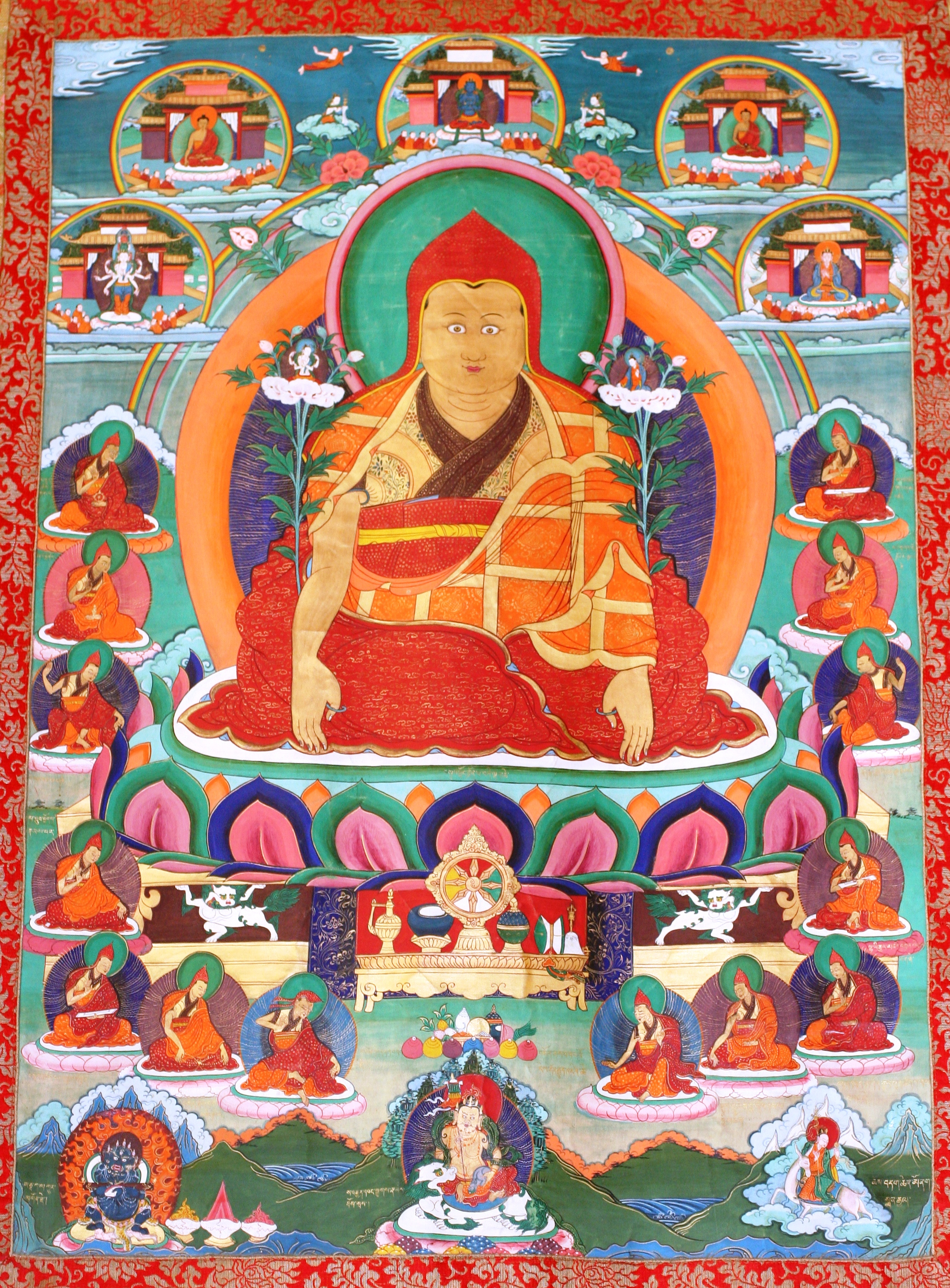
Thangkha with Jonang lama Dolpopa Sherab Gyaltsen (1292–1361)

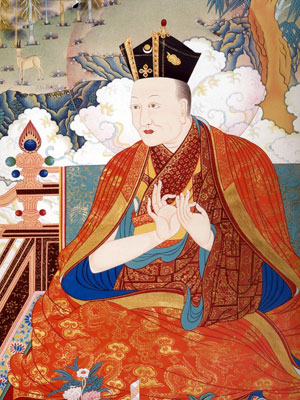
Chödrak Gyatso (1454–1506), seventh Karmapa, head of the Kagyu School

Shentong was systematized and spread by Dölpopa Shérap Gyeltsen (1292–1361), a Sakya trained lama who later joined the Jonang school, studied under Khetsun Yonten Gyatso (1260-1327), and became a great scholar practitioner of Jonang Kālacakra. In 1321 Dölpopa visited Tsurphu Monastery for the first time, and had extensive discussions with the third Karmapa Rangjung Dorje (1284–1339). Rangjung Dorje may have influenced the development of some of Dölpopa's theories. (Note: See also Karl Brunnhölzl (2008), In Praise of Dharmadhatu, a translation of Rangjung Dorje's commentary on the Dharmadhātustava, "I Parise of the Dharmadhatu," a treatise which is (incorrectly) attributed to Nagarjuna.)

Dölpopa claimed to have extraordinary insights, (Note: Dolpopa: "I discovered many profound essential points which have not been discovered, have not been realized, and have not been mastered by egotistical scholars, most great meditators endowed with experience and realization, and most of those who are arrogant as great upholders of secret mantra. Because a fine realization burst forth from within, and because I have an exceptional certainty untainted by doubts, not only most great meditators endowed with experience and realization, and those who are arrogant as great upholders of secret mantra, but even the Buddha definitely could not turn me back from this.") and his meditational experience seems to have played a great role in the development of his shentong view. Dölpopa developed a new philosophical vocabulary, based on Sanskrit and Tibetan, to express his insights. He coined new terms including shentong, and khunzhi yeshe ("universal-ground primordial awareness"), and popularized other terms like "Great Madhyamaka". He also made use of terms from Mahayana scriptures which were not in use in Tibet at the time, for example, he referred to the ultimate truth as atman (self), nitya (eternal), and dhruva (immovable). According to Tāranātha, Dölpopa also unified two shentong lineages, the sūtra lineage of Maitreya-Asaṅga (through Maitrīpa, Ratnākaraśānti, Su Gawé Dorje, Dsen Kawoché and so on) and the Kālacakratantra shentong lineage of Kālacakrapāda the Elder (through Bodhibhadra, Paṇḍita Somanātha, and Yumowa Mikyö Dorje).

In the 15th century, shentong had become accepted by some figures in the Sakya and Kagyu schools. Sakya scholar Shakya Chokden (1428–1507), Shakya's teacher Rongton, and Chödrak Gyatso, 7th Karmapa Lama (1454–1506, who was a student of Shakya Chokden), were all proponents of a shentong view, though they had their own unique interpretations of shentong that are not identical to the stronger Jonang form of shentong.

In the Jonang tradition, Tāranātha (1575–1635) is second in importance only to Dölpopa himself. He was responsible for the short-lived renaissance of the school as a whole in the late sixteenth and early seventeenth centuries, and of the widespread revitalization of the shentong theory in particular. Tāranātha wrote a commentary on the Heart Sutra which asserts that the Sutra, and prajñāpāramitā, teaches the shentong view. He also wrote important texts explaining and justifying the shentong view of the three natures based on arguments from the Madhyāntavibhāga and Ratnagotravibhāga.

=== Criticism and repression ===
Shentong views have come under criticism particularly by some followers of the Sakya and Gelug schools of Tibetan Buddhism. The Sakya lama Rendawa Shonu Lodro (1348-1413) was one of the earliest critics of the view, and so was his student, Je Tsongkhapa (1357–1419), the founder of the Gelug school. Tsongkhapa sees the view of "other-emptiness" as absolutist and essentialist, and Tibetan Rangtong scholars of the Gelugpa school accused the Shentong-oriented Jonang school of being 'crypto-Vedantist.' According to Tsongkhapa, emptiness is itself empty of inherent existence and thus only exists nominally and conventionally as dependent arising. There is thus no "transcendental ground," and "ultimate reality" that has an existence of its own.

Early in his life, Rendawa wrote a refutation of Jonang Kalachakra which led to further debates and counter-refutations by Jonang scholars like Jangchup Senge, although Rendawa's later writings moderated and were more balanced in their treatment of the Jonang Kalachakra.

The great fourteenth-century Sakya master Buton Rinchen Drub (1290–1364) was also very critical of shentong views, although he was unwilling to directly debate Dölpopa on the matter. Gyaltsab Je and Khedrup Gelek Pelzang, 1st Panchen Lama, two of Gelug founder Je Tsongkhapa's primary disciples, were also particularly critical of shentong in the 15th century.

Shentong was suppressed by the dominant Gelug school for several hundred years, equally for political reasons as doctrinal reasons. In 1658, the Gelug authorities banned the Jonang school and its texts for political reasons, forcibly converting its monks and monasteries to the Gelug school, as well as banning shentong philosophy and books, thus making the rangtong position the overwhelmingly majority one in Tibetan Buddhism. The texts of Shakya Chokden, which promoted shentong and criticized Tsongkhapa, were also banned in the 17th century.

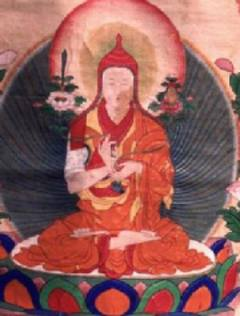
Jamgön Kongtrül Lodrö Thayé (1813–1899), an exponent of shentong in the modern era

After the suppression of the Jonang school and its texts and the texts of Śākya Chokden by the Tibetan government in the seventeenth century, various shentong views were propagated mainly by Karma Kagyu and Nyingma lamas. Key figures of this revival include Katok Tsewang Norbu (1698–1755), the head of Katok monastery, and the Kagyu lama Situ Panchen (1700–1774), a senior court chaplain in the Kingdom of Derge, a student of Katok Tsewang Norbu and the 8th Tai Situpa. These two figures were instrumental in the spread of shentong views outside of Jonang. Tsewang Norbu was a student of the Jonang lama Künsang Wangpo, and he introduced shentong and the Kālacakra tantra tradition into Kagyu and Nyingma. He was also a teacher of the Thirteenth Karmapa, and the Tenth Shamarpa.

=== Modern period ===
The 19th century saw a further revival of shentong, particularly within figures of the Rimé movement like Jamyang Kyentsé Wangpo (1820–1892) and Jamyang Chökyi Lodrö (1896–1958). A key Rime defender of a strong Dölpopa influenced shentong was Jamgön Kongtrül (1813–1899), and his work remains influential in Kagyu circles today. The influential Nyingma scholar Jamgön Ju Mipham (1846–1912) also defended a unique view of shentong in his Lion's Roar of Shentong; at least one of Mipham's students was a shentongpa, Shechen Gyaltsab Padma Namgyal (1871–1926), who was the root lama of Dilgo Khyentse Rinpoche and also a lama of Dzongsar Khyentse Chökyi Lodrö.

In the modern period, the Jonang school also experienced a revival. Key Jonang defenders of shentong in this era include Bamda Gelek Gyatso (1844-1904), Tsoknyi Gyatso (1880-1940), Ngawang Lodro Drakpa (1920-75), Kunga Tukje Palsang (1925-2000) and Ngawang Yonten Sangpo (1928-2002).

The strong form of shentong defended by Dölpopa and Tāranātha remains the main philosophical theory of the Jonang school. Other forms of shentong (mainly influenced by the interpretations of Kongtrul and Mipham) are also taught by some lamas of the Kagyu, Sakya, and Nyingma schools. According to Cyrus Stearns, Kagyu and Nyingma forms of shentong "vary a great deal from the original teachings of Dölpopa" and "represents a synthesis that has developed over time, primarily in order to enable Dölpopa's most profound insights to be incorporated into the established doctrines of the Great Seal and the Great Perfection." However, other Nyingmas, particularly those associated with the Kathok Monastery, hold shentong views closer to those of the Jonang, with Getsé Mahāpaṇḍita stating that "The abiding mode of the Great Perfection singlely accords with the Great Middle Way of other-emptiness."

== Shentong philosophies ==
=== Forms of shentong ===
As Karl Brunnhölzl notes, there is no single shentong view, rather there is "a great variety of ways in which different Tibetan masters understand this term and how they formulate the associated view." Brunnhölzl mentions a text by the twentieth-century Kagyü scholar Surmang Padma Namgyal, which includes seven main forms of shentong:

1. The Jonang shentong of Dölpopa, which sees consciousness as self-empty, and the buddha-wisdom as other-empty (shentong).
2. Śākya Chokden's (1428–1507) view, which sees phenomenal appearance as self-empty and luminosity as other-empty.
3. Sabsang Mati Paṇchen, a student of Dölpopa, who taught that subject-object dualism is self-empty, and that the expanse (dbyings) and wisdom is other-empty.
4. The view of Dudul Dorje (1733–1797), the Thirteenth Karmapa, which holds that while saṃsāra is self-empty, nirvāṇa is other empty.
5. The view of Mikyö Dorje (1507–1554), the 8th Karmapa, which holds that the pure buddha-bodies and buddha-wisdom is self-empty in terms of their mode of being, but other-empty in how they appear.
6. The view of Situ Panchen (8th Situpa), which sees negation as self-empty and affirmation as other-empty.
7. The view of the Gaḥto Monastery Nyingma lama Gédsé Paṇchen (1761–1829), which holds "the phase of conclusive resolve during meditative equipoise to be rangtong and the phase of clearly distinguishing during subsequent attainment to be shentong."

Brunnhölzl adds that the various views listed here are based on three different understandings of the terms rangtong and shentong. As Brunnhölzl writes, "the first—and most common—category takes rangtong and shentong to refer to phenomena as belonging to two different levels of reality (seeming and ultimate), which underlies views (1)–(5). The second category refers to rangtong and shentong as two approaches to conceptually determine the subject in question (6). The third category considers rangtong and shentong as distinct (nonconceptual) experiences or phases in the process of attaining realization (7)." Thus, the term shentong can refer to a metaphysical theory, a doctrinal conceptual schema and a way to explain a specific experience.

=== Jonang shentong ===
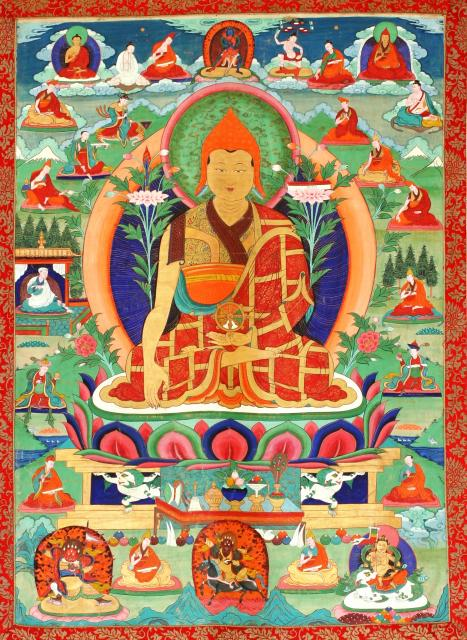
Tāranātha, a Jonang scholar

The shentong doctrine of the Jonang school views the two truths doctrine as distinguishing between an ultimate reality (buddha-nature, the dharmadhatu) and a relative reality (all other phenomena). According to this view, the buddha-nature is real (and not empty of inherent existence), while all other phenomena are empty of inherent existence or self-nature (svabhava). The ultimate reality is also described as empty, but it is empty in a different way. The absolute reality is "empty" (Wylie: stong) only of "other" (Wylie: gzhan) relative phenomena, but it is not empty of its own nature (as the expanse endowed with all buddha qualities).

Thus, Dölpopa distinguishes between two different modes of emptiness, one which applies to relative truth and another which applies to the ultimate. Dölpopa writes:

Because all that is present as the two modes of emptiness are equal in being emptiness, there are statements with the single phrase, "All is emptiness," but there are also statements that distinguish between empty of self-nature and empty of other. So their intent should also be precisely presented. Concerning that, because relative and incidental entities are completely nonexistent in their true mode of existence, they are empty of own-essence. That is being empty of self-nature. Because the original absolute that is empty of those relative phenomena is never nonexistent, it is empty of other.

This "other-empty" (shentong) absolute reality is the "all-basis wisdom" or "gnosis of the ground of all" (kun gzhi ye shes, Skt. ālaya-jñāna) which is "uncreated and indestructible, unconditioned and beyond the chain of dependent origination" and is the basis for both samsara and nirvana. According to Stearns, Dölpopa also considers this absolute as "natural luminosity (which is synonymous with the dharmakaya) and a primordial, indestructible, eternal great bliss inherently present in every living being."

The relative reality (which is empty of itself, i.e. rangtong) refers to the impermanent phenomena which arise and cease and are dependent on causes and conditions. This is particularly used to refer to the impure mental defilements and worldly thoughts which veil the ultimate buddha-nature. It is also associated with the ālāyavijñāna (Tib. kun gzhi rnam shes). Dölpopa compares the pure all-basis wisdom or buddha-nature with a clear sky, while the impure relative phenomena are compared to clouds which only temporarily obscure it.

According to Dölpopa, the tathāgatagarbha (buddha-nature, synonymous with the dharmadhātu) refers to the Ratnagotravibhāga's perfections of supreme purity, permanence, self, and bliss. Brunnhölzl writes that for Dölpopa, this buddha-nature "is liberated from all characteristics of reference points, is beyond terms and thoughts, and is the object of unmistaken nonconceptual wisdom. Since it withstands analysis through reasoning, one can only mistake it for something that it is not when one subjects it to such analysis." Dölpopa states that this ultimate reality is the same as "the reflections of the emptiness endowed with all supreme aspects" (sarvākāravaropetāśūnyatā) taught in the Kālacakra, which is an emptiness endowed with awakened qualities.

Dölpopa referred to another view he termed "rangtong" (self-empty). This was the mainstream interpretation of emptiness and madhyamaka in Tibetan Buddhism, which held that all phenomena (dharmas) are empty of a self-nature (svabhava) in both the relative and absolute sense. The term rangtong is often used by defenders of the shentong view to refer to the views of those who reject the view of shentong, such as Tsongkhapa (1357–1419). What makes "rangtong" a different view is that it rejects the idea that there is anything (even Buddhahood) that is not empty of essential nature (svabhava) and as such, all phenomena only exist dependently (even nirvana and the buddha's wisdom). Shentong meanwhile holds that there is something which truly exists in an absolute sense, and this is the Buddha wisdom (buddhajñana) or the continuum of luminous mind (prabhāsvara).

In Jonang shentong, one initially studies rangtong style madhyamaka analysis through the classic Indian Madhyamaka texts (mainly Nagarjuna's Collection of Reasoning), then one goes beyond these teaching using the "Great Madhyamaka" shentong teachings of the third turning. Thus, Dölpopa did not completely reject the rangtong view, he merely saw it as the lower and incomplete view of the second turning of the wheel of Dharma. According to Dölpopa, rangtong teachings were teachings of provisional meaning, while shentong teachings were the final and definitive teachings. Dölpopa also held that the ultimate intent of the provisional teachings is the same buddha-nature and therefore the scriptures of the second and third turning along with the yogacara and madhyamaka traditions are ultimately all in agreement. Dölpopa draws on various Indian sources to defend this position, including the Maitreya Chapter of the Large Prajñāpāramitā sutra, the Bṛhaṭṭīkā commentary (which he attributed to Vasubandhu) and Nagarjuna's Collection of Hymns.

=== Shentong in Kagyü ===
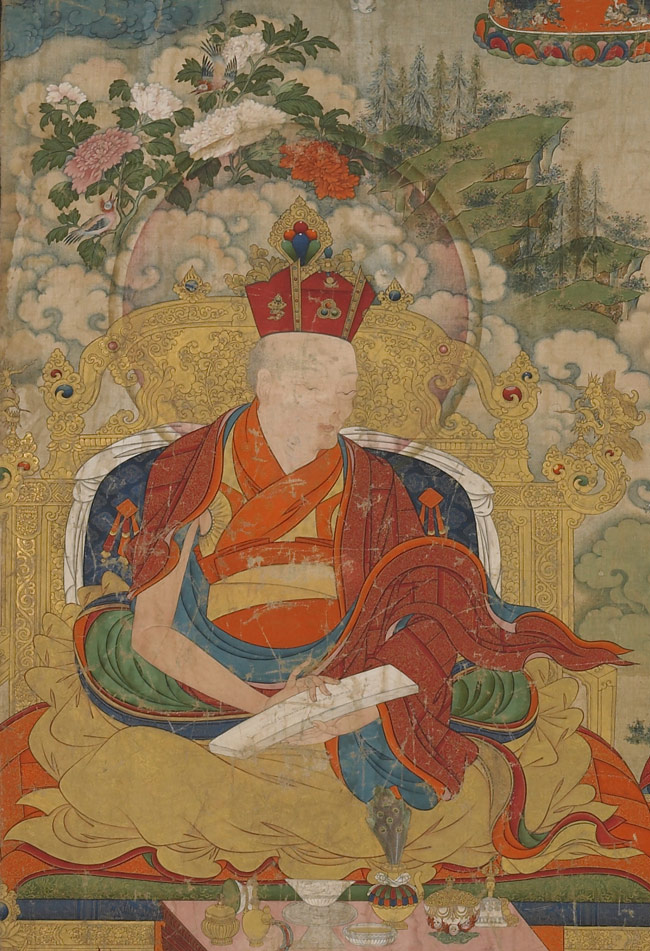
Situ Panchen, 8th Situpa, founder and head of Palpung Monastery

Numerous Kagyu lamas have taught various forms of shentong, including the Seventh Karmapa, the Eighth Karmapa, the Thirteenth Karmapa, the Fifth Shamarpa, the Eighth Situpa Situ Panchen, and Jamgön Kongtrul. Shentong views have also been defended by recent Kagyu Lamas like Kalu Rinpoche, Khenpo Tsultrim Gyamtso Rinpoche and Thrangu Rinpoche.

==== The Karmapas ====
The view of shentong upheld by the Karmapas, the traditional heads of the Karma Kagyü school, is a view which synthesizes prasangika madhyamaka with shentong ideas.

According to Karl Brunnhölzl, Rangjung Dorje, the Third Karmapa "is traditionally considered the foremost authority on the view of buddha nature in the Karma Kagyü School." Brunnhölzl notes that his view "neither matches Shentong as understood by Dölpopa, Tāranātha, and other Jonangpas, nor Śākya Chogden's or Jamgön Kongtrul Lodrö Tayé's presentations of it." The Third Karmapa's view is that the dharmakāya is an "unconditioned and spontaneously present mind" which transcends all concepts and reference points and is all pervading, like space. This is said to "exist as ultimate reality" but it is not said to be "really established, permanent, enduring, and totally unchanging."

This is the view also defended by the Chödrak Gyatso (1454–1506), the Seventh Karmapa, in his Ocean of Texts on Reasoning, who also argues that "rangtong and shentong are not contradictory". The Seventh Karmapa held that the buddha-nature taught in the true shentong is "the great freedom from extremes, the inseparability of appearance and emptiness, and the union of the two realities". He further describes it as "mind as such, unconfined, unbiased, naturally luminous, expanse and awareness inseparable, the great sphere, ordinary mind." He rejected Jonang shentong as eternalistic for positing an eternal and immutable ultimate reality permanent. He also argues that this view insults the Buddhas "by implying that sentient beings are completely perfect buddhas."

Similarly, the Thirteenth Karmapa, Düdül Dorje (1733–1797) states:

both the middle and the final wheel [of dharma] have the purport of the sugata heart, the unity of emptiness and luminosity. The middle [wheel] explains this mainly by teaching emptiness, while the final [wheel] elucidates it mainly by teaching luminosity. I understand that, in actuality, these are not contradictory.

==== Jamgön Kongtrul ====
The currently popularity of shentong in the Kagyü school is mainly due to the influence of the great scholar Jamgön Kongtrul.

Kongtrül held that "Shentong Madhyamaka" was the ultimate meaning of the third turning of the wheel of Dharma and of Nagarjuna's hymns. As such, he saw it as the highest view which presents "the primordial wisdom of emptiness free of elaborations." According to Kongtrül, the very nature of primordial wisdom which is free of all extremes is immanent in all consciousnesses. Furthermore, for Kongtrül, this non-dual primordial wisdom is truly established, otherwise the ultimate reality would be a kind of nothingness.

==== Khenpo Tsültrim Gyamtso ====
One popular living exponent of Kagyu shentong is Khenpo Tsültrim Gyamtso, and his view is taught in Progressive Stages of Meditation on Emptiness, translated by his student Lama Shenpen Hookham. In this work, Khenpo Tsültrim presents five stages of meditation (related to different schools or approaches), culminating in the shentong view. These five are:

- "Sravaka meditation on non-self" - meditation on the emptiness of the five aggregates and the non-existence of a personal self (atman);
- "Cittamatra-approach" - meditation on the mind-stream, the ever-continuing process of perception, and the non-duality of perceived and perceiver;
- "Svatantrika-Madhyamaka approach" - meditation on all dharmas, which are empty of self-nature, and the negation of any "substance";
- "Prasangika-Madhyamaka approach" - meditation on "the non-conceptual (nisprapanca) nature of both the appearance of phenomena and their self-emptiness." In this approach, all concepts are to be abandoned;
- Shentong (Yogacara-Madhyamaka) - meditation on the non-dual ultimate reality (paramarthasatya), which is the Buddha-wisdom (buddha-jñana), which is beyond concepts, and is described by terms like "truly existing." This buddha wisdom is "the non-dual nature of Mind completely unobscured and endowed with its countless Buddha Qualities" (buddhagunas).

According to Lama Shenpen Hookham, the absolute reality is described in positive terms by the shentong view because this approach helps one "overcome certain residual subtle concepts" and the habit "of negating whatever experience arises." While the shentong view destroys false concepts (like all madhyamaka), it also alerts the practitioner "to the presence of a dynamic, positive Reality that is to be experienced once the conceptual mind is defeated."

=== In Nyingma ===
Katok Tsewang Norbu (1698–1755), head of Katok monastery, is the main figure who introduced shentong into the Nyingma tradition. While shentong is not a widely held view in Nyingma, some important Nyingma scholars have defended shentong, including Lochen Dharmaśrī (1654–1717), and Gedsé Paṇḍita Gyurmé Tsewang Chogdrub (1761–1829).

The noted nineteenth-century Nyingma lama Jamgon Ju Mipham Gyatso wrote works both supportive and critical of shentong positions. (Note: I.e., in his Lion's Roar of Extrinsic Emptiness (q.v. external link cited below) and in his Long Excursus on the Core of Thus-Arrivedness i.e., tathãgatagarbha (bde-gshegs snying-po stong-thun chen-mo seng-ge'i nga-ro). In the Long Excursus Mipham Rinpoche follows closely the gist of an historically much earlier discussion of the subject of "lineage", (Note: (Tib. rigs, Skt. gotta), synonymous with Buddha-nature) that of Longchenpa's Treasure of Philosophical Systems (grub mtha' mdzod). There Mipham identifies two general extremes of interpretation, the nihilistic identification of Buddha-nature with emptiness to the exclusion of form, and the identification of Buddha-nature as a substantially real entity that is "empty-of-other" (gzhan-gyis stong-pa). Thus it appears that Mipham Rinpoche wished to distance himself from both the Gelug/Sakya mainstream (e.g., rangtong or self-emptiness) interpretation as well as the shentong mainstream. However, what Mipham refers to in the Long Excursus as shentong is only vaguely defined as such, and to that extent, bears more resemblance to the stock misinterpretations of shentong as given by its ideological opponents, than with any actual position held by classical Shentongpas themselves. In the final analysis, both Longchenpa's and Jamgon Ju Mipham Gyatso's interpretations of Buddha-nature in the aforementioned texts are substantially identical with most (though not all) of the most important philosophical distinctions invoked by Dolpopa and others in propounding the superiority and definitude of shentong approaches. Where Longchenpa and Mipham differ most obviously from self-identified Shentongpa commentators is in not applying the shentong label to their positions, such as Great Madhyamaka of Other-Emptiness (gzhan-stong dbu-ma chen-po).)

According to Stearns, Nyingma lamas such as Dilgo Khyentse Rinpoche (1910-91) and Dudjom Rinpoche (1904-87) all accepted a form of shentong.

One recent Nyingma lama that taught a shentong view (combined with prasangika madhyamaka) was Khenchen Palden Sherab Rinpoche.

== Shentong in practice ==
The shentong worldview is supported by different kinds of Buddhist practices in the various Tibetan buddhist traditions.

In the Jonang school, the main spiritual practice which accompanies the view of shentong is the practice of the Kālacakratantra's six branched yoga. Klaus Dieter Mathes has argued that the nonconceptual yogic experiences described by sources like the Śrīlaghukālacakratantra and the Vimalaprabhā commentary are important meditative experiences in this tradition. Particularly important is the experience of the "reflection of emptiness" (śūnyatābimba: stong nyid gzugs brnyan).

In the Kagyu tradition, the main method of practice used by shentong adherents are Mahāmudrā style meditations which are strongly influenced by the Ratnagotravibhāga. Some of these sources have been translated by Karl Brunnholzl in his When the Clouds Part: The Uttaratantra and Its Meditative Tradition as a Bridge between Sutra and Tantra (2015).

== See also ==
- Dölpopa Sherab Gyaltsen
- Jonang
- Nondualism
