= Black Crown =

Important symbol of the Karmapa (head of the Karma Kagyu school of Tibetan Buddhism)

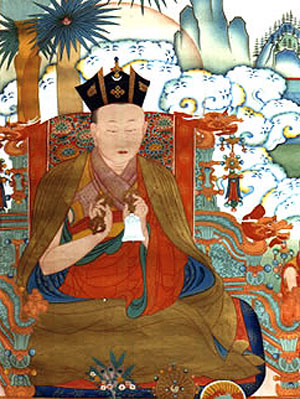
Deshin Shekpa, wearing the Black Crown

The Black Crown (Tibetan: ཞྭ་ནག་, Wylie: zhwa nag) is an important symbol of the Karmapa, the Lama who heads the Karma Kagyu school of Tibetan Buddhism. The crown signifies his power to benefit all sentient beings. Similar crowns in red are worn by the Shamarpa and the Tai Situpa, while Goshir Gyaltsab wears an orange crown. These crowns were bestowed by the Karmapa.

Legend tells that in a previous eon, in a former life as an accomplished yogi, the Karmapa attained the eighth level or bhumi of the bodhisattvas. At this time, 100,000 dakinis (female buddhas) manifested their hair as a crown, and offered it to the Karmapa as a symbol of his accomplishment.

Dusum Khyenpa, the 1st Karmapa, was regarded as an emanation of that yogi and his appearance was predicted by the historical Buddha Shakyamuni in the Samadhiraja Sutra:

A bodhisattva with the lion's roar will appear. He will use the power he achieved in deep meditation to benefit countless beings. By seeing, hearing, touching or thinking of him, they will be led to happiness

== Origin ==
The Karmapas were traditionally the teachers of the successive Ming dynasty Emperors of China. When the 5th Karmapa, Dezhin Shegpa, met the Yongle Emperor, the Emperor, through his devotion and spiritual realization, was able to perceive Karmapa in the Sambhogakaya form of Vajradhara (Tib. Dorje Chang), wearing a black crown on his head. The Karmapa explained to the Emperor that he had seen the 'Vajra Crown', the power-field of wisdom-energy that is always present above the Karmapa's head. The emperor offered to have a physical replica made so that others could receive its blessing.

A crown encrusted with precious stones and topped by a huge ruby was commissioned, and upon receiving this, the 5th Karmapa started the tradition of the Black Crown Ceremony which has been performed by successive Karmapa incarnations up to and including the 16th Karmapa, Rangjung Rigpe Dorje.

== Ceremony ==
In preparation for the ceremony the Karmapa meditates on inseparability with Chenrezig, the Buddha of Compassion. Prostrations and a mandala offering are made, followed by the seven branch prayer. These offerings allow the audience/participants to accumulate additional merit for the ceremony that ensues. The Karmapa then places the crown on his head while reciting the mantra 'Om Mani Padme Hung', transmitting blessings to each participant in the ceremony to the extent that they are capable of receiving them (e.g., if in that moment one regards Karmapa as a living Buddha, then one will receive the blessings of a Buddha). It is said that by merely seeing the Black Crown during the ceremony, one will become a bodhisattva of the first bhumi within three lifespans. This is one of the key reasons why the Black Crown is so important to the Karma Kagyu lineage.

== Recent developments ==
In the early 1960s, the 16th Karmapa brought the Black Crown and other valuable relics of the Kagyu lineage to Rumtek monastery in Sikkim. They remained there in safekeeping until 1993 following the 16th Karmapa’s death. The ensuing split in his lineage caused a conflict at the monastery between supporters of the two rival claimants for the title of Karmapa. Since that time, it is said that many valuable items have disappeared from the cloister. On July 5, 2004, the Indian Supreme Court delivered a final judgement to grant Rumtek monastery to the Karmapa Charitable Trust, principal supporters of Thaye Dorje, one of the rival candidates for the title of 17th Karmapa. Since then an inventory of valuables is being prepared. The location and integrity of the Black Crown is currently unknown.
