= Situ Panchen =

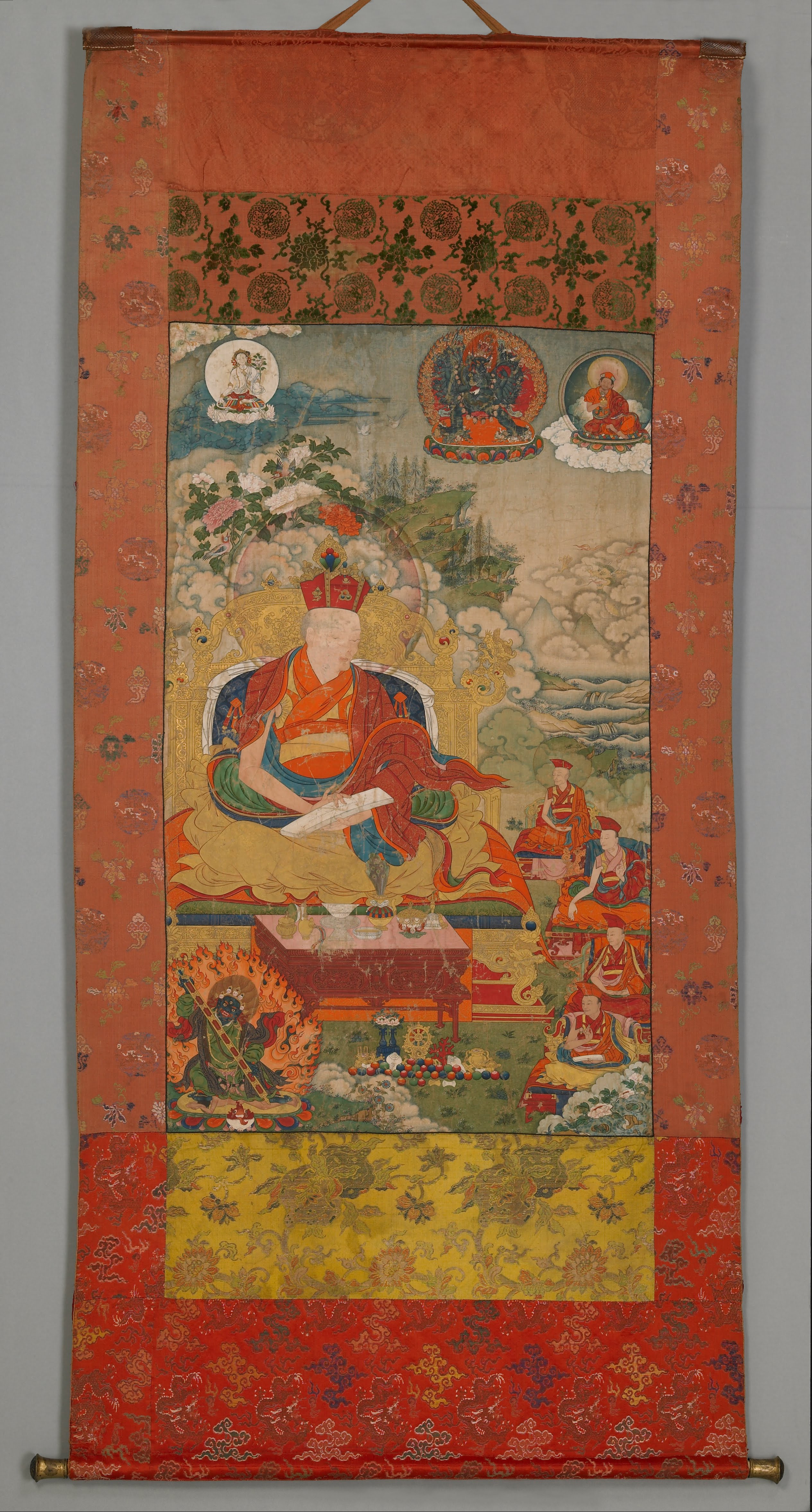
Situ Panchen Chögyi Jungney, painting by Chöying Dorje, 10th Karmapa

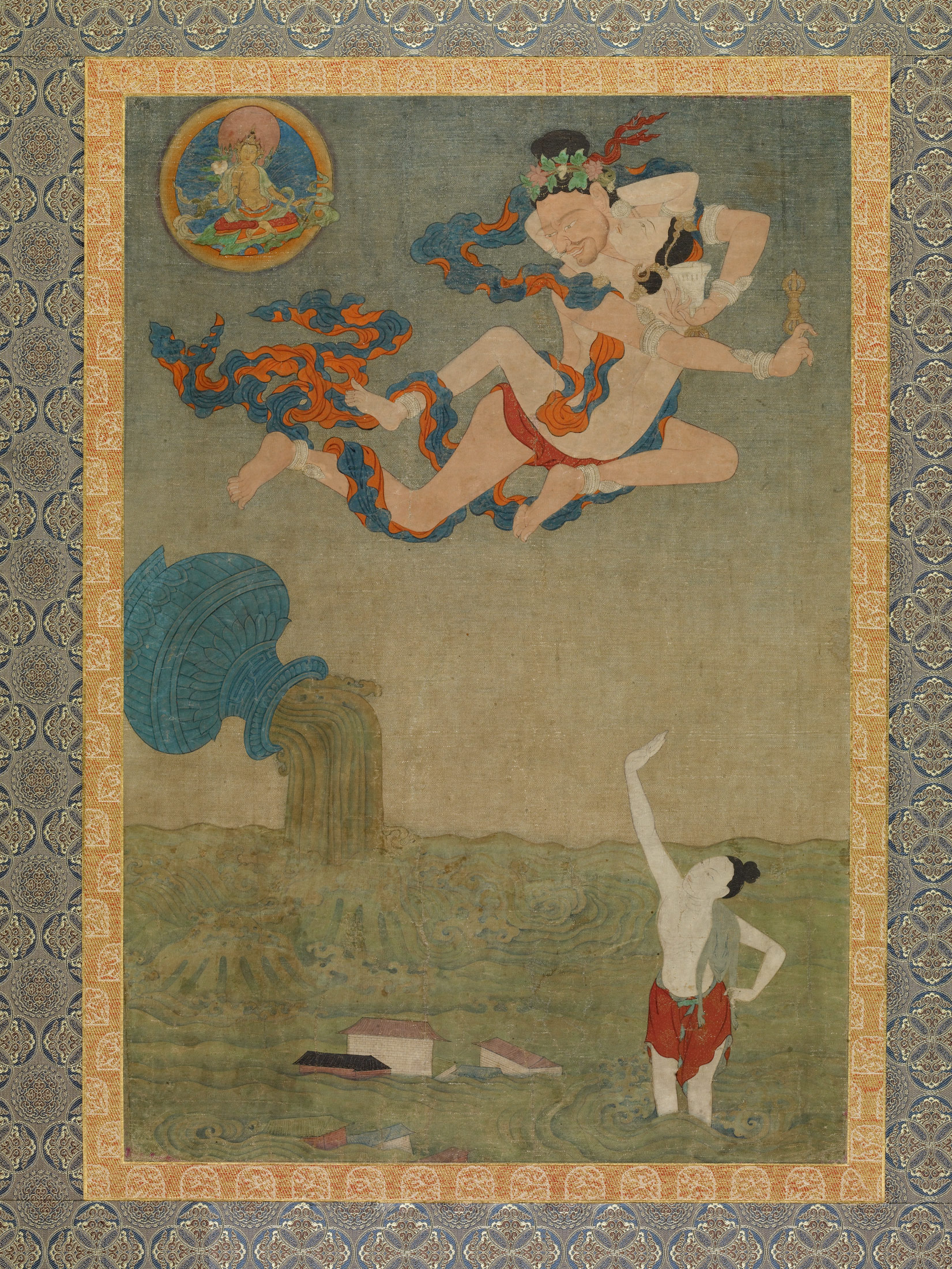
Mahasiddha Ghantapa, from Situ's set of the Eight Great Tantric Adepts. 18th century

Situ Panchen (1700–1774), whose formal name is the 8th Tai Situ Panchen Chögyi Jungnye (Tibetan: སི་ཏུ་པན་ཆེན་ཆོས་ཀྱི་འབྱུང་གནས, Wylie: si tu pan chen chos kyi 'abyung gnas), was the renown 8th Tai Situ Rinpoche. He was also an influential Tibetan painter, writer and medical innovator as well as a notable figure in the histories of Karma Kagyu and the Kingdom of Dêgê, where he served as senior court chaplain.

The birth of the 8th Tai Situ, Chokyi Jungne was recorded in many different texts and in literature, and many great masters made the prophecies of his arrival. For example, the 11th Karmapa, Yeshe Dorje, predicted the place where Chokyi Jungne was born.

The 8th Kenting Tai Situ, Chokyi Jungne (1700–1774), was born in the province of A-Lo Shega at Atarong, which corresponded to the prophecy. His father was Ngawang Tsering and his mother Tranguma.

When Chokyi Jungne was born, Lama Kunchen, a master of the Treasure Transmission Lineage, performed the Dorje Drolo ceremony for him and gave him the name "Gonpo Sun".

At the age of two, Lama Kunchen took him to Tsurphu monastery to see the 11th Karmapa. The Karmapa gave Lama Kunchen a silk bag full of big black pills, a pearl with no eye, and a prophecy letter written "Situ, the golden dragon, born at A-Lo". The 11th Karmapa asked Lama Kunchen to offer all these to the incarnation of Kenting Tai Situ. Chokyi Jungne in consequence was recognized to be the incarnation of the 7th Kenting Tai Situ.

At the age of five, Chokyi Jungne began to learn to read and write Tibetan from his father, and performed a Vajravarahi (Dorje pagmo, Vajra Yogini) ceremony taught by Lama Kunchen.

At the age of seven, the 8th Shamar Chokyi Dondrup conferred a longevity prayer and conferred the name "Situ Chokyi Jungne Trinley Kunkyab Palzangpo".

At the age of eight, Chokyi Jungne visited the 12th Karmapa Changchub Dorje.

At the age of nine, Chokyi Jungne suffered from a serious illness because one relative of his father put poison in his food, due to jealousy. Two months later, he was on the mend, but he still could not stand or just sit. He lay on the bed and read twice all the literatures in Paljor monastery. At the same time, Chokyi Jungne also learned the Five sciences, a Hindi dialect, and Sanskrit. He could communicate with people precisely and fluently also in Chinese, Sanskrit, or Mongolian. With only a little teaching, it was said he could become skillful in all kinds of painting, carving, etc., even better than those who learned these skills for their whole lives. In short, Chokyi Jungne became famous as "thorough knowledge".

At the age of 14, he was recognized according to predictions left by the 8th Karmapa Mikyo Dorje, by Terton Sangye Lingpa, Takshampa Mingyur Dorje and by the 8th Shamar Chokyi Dondrup. He was taken to Tsurphu monastery for his enthronement and he received all the lineage teachings and empowerments, and studied philosophy and medicine from Karmapa Jangchub Dorje, Shamar Rinpoche, and Rigzin Tsewang Norbu.

At the age of 22, Chokyi Jungne convened scholars in He-Le to transcribe Tengyur based on the transcript kept in Chiwa-Datse. After completing the transcribing in two months, he traveled west to Nepal on pilgrimage, discussing knowledge with many scholars. He made pilgrimage at the Boudha Stupa in 1723 with the 12th Karmapa, Changchub Dorje.

At the age of 23, he visited Ladakh and performed an empowerment for the king and his family. Then, he returned to Paljor Monastery. At that period of time, he painted a set of thangkhas of the Eight mahasiddhas using the style of Gadri school of painting, and offered them to the king of Dege.

On the second day of the third month in the Female Fire Sheep Year (1727), at the age of 28 years, Chokyi Jungne, under the permission of the king of Dege, he started building the great Palpung Monastery, and accomplished its founding on the auspicious tenth day of the eighth month of the year. He also built and restored countless other monasteries throughout his life. Palpung Monastery became the main seat of the Kenting Tai Situ Rinpoches, and it inspired the founding of Palpung Sherab Ling Monastery in India by the 12th Kenting Tai Situ Rinpoche Pema Donyo Nyinjey, centuries later.

Chokyi Jungne edited the texts of the Kangyur and Tengyur in Dege's library, and worked on many other texts before making printing plates of the pechas. His disciple, Tenpa Tsering, the King of Dege, established the famous Dege Printing Press in Derge. Chokyi Jungne aided the Derge Printing Press to produce over 500,000 wood block prints. These prints are such fine quality that the major ones have been reprinted in modern editions and circulated to Tibetan archives in libraries throughout the world.

Chokyi Jungne painted a series of thangkhas that illustrate stories of Buddha Shakyamuni. These thangkhas were painted in an Indian style, decorated with imitation Chinese embroidery, and were very different from the existed Gadri school in layout, outline and colors, and were thus called the new Gadri school, or Karma Gadri school. Chokyi Jungne also painted many other thangkhas and made many sculptures, which all enrich the Tibetan art culture.

At the age of 30, Chokyi Jungne went to Tibet for the third time. He visited Tsurphu monastery for the opening of a great statue. Then he stayed in Tibet on pilgrimage and taught in Tibet for four years.

In the Wood Mouse Year, Chokyi Jungne completed the famous linguistic text, "Situ's Commentary of Tibetan Grammar". The grammar text is still used as a senior-level grammar text in Tibet today.

In the Wood Cow Year, Chokyi Jungne went to Tibet for the fourth time. He recognized and enthroned the new Shamarpa. Then he visited Nepal again on pilgrimage and was highly honored there. Once, after a debate with Pandita Jaya Mangola of Kashmir, it was proclaimed by the local Hindus that Kenting Tai Situpa must have been blessed by the Lord Shiva, since that was the only way he could have achieved such insight and learning.

At the age of 50, according to the Tibetan medical texts, Chokyi Jungne made the famous medical pill called the "Moon Nectar Pill". In the Fire Mouse Year, he made a very special pill that spontaneously grew bigger and bigger until they spilled out of the bottle - and then the pills became all kind of Buddhas. Afterwards, Chokyi Jungne performed more experiments and made many special pills. He became a skilled physician of Sowa Rigpa and a master of Tibetan traditional medicine. He composed and wrote medical texts that are still consulted for their valuable medical guidance.

At the age of 60, The Kenting Tai Situ visited Jangsadam, south of China, for the second time. There, he lit the lamp of the Buddha Dharma, and rebuilt thirteen monasteries of the Kagyu school. In the same period, he translated many texts from Sanskrit, including prayers to the Bodhisattva Tara. He also visited China at the invitation of the Qianlong Emperor (1735-1796) and was highly honored.

At the age of 63, he visited Tibet on pilgrimage for the fifth time. He retreated in a Drikung monastery. At that time, when he performed any kind of offering ceremony, a miracle emanation vision of Dorje Drolo showed up. Once in a Tara fire offering ceremony, the tent he slept grew many blue lotuses. In usual time, he kept reciting mantras except for short periods of rest time at noon and at night. His mantra recitations totalled three hundred million times of all kinds of mantras. He displayed many miracles in Tibet, like an intention to stop a rainstorm, spreading barley to the sky and the barley straightened on the ground.

He found and recognized the 13th Karmapa Dudul Dorje, and personally taught the Karmapa and imparted the complete lineage to him.

At the age of 72, Chokyi Jungne invited the 13th Karmapa Dudul Dorje to Palpung monastery. He performed Taisho Tripitaka lineage empowerments and teachings for the Karmapa. At that time, the sky was filled of colorful clouds, a sacred sign enhancing people's faith to the 13th Karmapa.

In 1774, at the age of 74, Chokyi Jungne was invited to China. On the way to China, while meditating in the lotus posture of a Buddha, the Kenting Tai Situ died. It was observed that his heart-region retained heat for seven days and there was a strong smell of incense everywhere. Kenting Tai Situ Rinpoche had predicted his next rebirth before his passing.

The 8th Kenting Tai Situpa was one of the most famous masters in Tibetan history. He was acknowledged as a supreme scholar who had no equal in the Five sciences - logic, grammar, philosophy, medicine, and the arts. He is honored with a unique title, "Maha Pandita". His fame reached well beyond the borders of Tibet in his time. He also built and rebuilt many monasteries of different lineages. These monasteries became Palpung's branch monasteries, exceeding well beyond a hundred, and included monasteries in mainland China.

It is said that his limitless activities were equal to those of Nagajuna's in India. It was also a common saying at the time, that if all of the other Kagyu monasteries came together, their activity wouldn't be equal to that of Situ Chokyi Jungne.

His foremost disciples were the 13th Karmapa, the 10th Shamarpa, Gyalwang Drukpa Trinley Shingta, Drikung Chokyi Gyalwa, Pawo Tsuklag Gyalwa, Drubtop Choje Gyal, Khamtrul Chokyi Nyima, and Lotsawa Tsewang Kunchab.
