= Gyaltsab =

Gyaltsab (Tibetan: རྒྱལ་ཚབ།, Wylie: Rgyal-tshab) is a Tibetan word meaning "regent". The title specifically refers to the following religious figures:

- Gyaltsab Je (1364–1432), the first Ganden Tripa;
- Goshir Gyaltsab, a lineage of Karma Kagyu tulkus, the most recent of whom was born in 1954.
