= Trinley Thaye Dorje =

Claimant to the title of 17th Karmapa

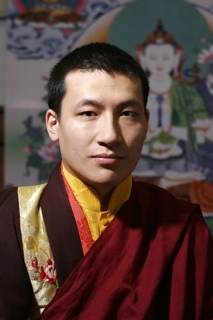
- Trinley Thaye Dorje in 2005
- Title: His Holiness; 17th Karmapa^{Co-claimant along with Ogyen Trinley Dorje}

Personal life
- Born: May 6, 1983 (age 43) Lhasa, Tibet, China
- Spouse: Rinchen Yangzom (m. 2017)
- Children: Thugsey
- Website: www.karmapa.org

Religious life
- Religion: Tibetan Buddhism
- Denomination: Vajrayana
- School: Karma Kagyu

Senior posting
- Predecessor: Rangjung Rigpe Dorje
- Reincarnation: Karmapa^{Co-claimant along with Ogyen Trinley Dorje}

Trinley Thaye Dorje (Tibetan: ཕྲིན་ལས་མཐའ་ཡས་རྡོ་རྗེ་, Wylie: Phrin-las Mtha'-yas Rdo-rje) (born 6 May 1983 in Lhasa) is a claimant to the title of 17th Karmapa.

The Karmapa is head of the Karma Kagyu school, one of the four main schools of Tibetan Buddhism. Ogyen Trinley Dorje and Thaye Dorje are the persisting claimants to that office and title.

== Biography ==
Born on 6 May 1983 in Tibet, Trinley Thaye Dorje is the son of the 3rd Mipham Rinpoche (Tshe-dbang Bdud-'dul lineage) of Junyung Monastery (one of several persons believed to be a reincarnation of Ju Mipham, an important lama of the Nyingmapa school) and Dechen Wangmo, the daughter of a noble family descended from King Gesar of Ling. At the age of six months, he is reported to have started telling people that he was the Karmapa. (The identification of the 17th Karmapa is disputed. See Karmapa controversy)

In October 1986, Chobgye Tri Rinpoche, senior Sakya master and head of one of the three Sakya lineages, contacted the Shamarpa and informed him about a dream he had had and about a relative of his from Lhasa who brought a picture of a child who reportedly and repeatedly announced that he was the Karmapa. In 1988 Lopon Tsechu Rinpoche was sent to obtain more information about the child.

In 1988, the 14th Kunzig Shamar Rinpoche went on a secret visit to Lhasa to investigate whether Trinley Thaye Dorje was the reincarnation of the 16th Karmapa, because, he said, the boy appeared to him in a dream. In 1994, after Trinley Thaye Dorje and his family escaped from Tibet to Nepal and then to India, Kunzig Shamar Rinpoche formally recognized him as the genuine reincarnation of the 16th Karmapa.

Shamar Rinpoche then presented Trinley Thaye Dorje to his students as the 17th Gyalwa Karmapa at the Karmapa International Buddhist Institute in New Delhi, India, in March 1994 and he was formally enthroned in Bodhgaya, where the historical Buddha achieved enlightenment, in December 1996.

He took monastic ordination from Chobgye Tri Rinpoche and underwent intensive education under the guidance of Shamar Rinpoche. Fluent in English, he has traveled extensively in the East and the West to spread the authentic teachings of the Karma Kagyu Lineage to increasingly large audiences.

On 25 March 2017, Trinley Thaye Dorje married Rinchen Yangzom of Bhutan. Their son Thugsey-la, which means "Heart-son", was born on 11 August 2018.

=== Eastern and western education ===
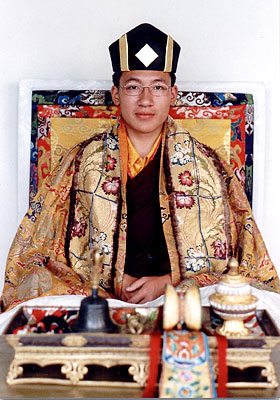
Trinley Thaye Dorje in ceremonial costume

Thaye Dorje's carefully coordinated escape from Tibet to India in 1994 received no media attention. Thaye Dorje was kept out of the spotlight so that he could receive the education, transmissions, and practice time necessary to develop the qualities required of the Karmapa.

Thaye Dorje has received training and transmissions in Buddhist philosophy and practice. His teachers have included the 14th Shamar Rinpoche, Professor Sempa Dorje and Khenpo Chödrak Tenphel. As a result of this, Thaye Dorje was enthroned as Vidhyadhara (Knowledge Holder) by the 14th Shamarpa in December 2003 at the Karmapa International Buddhist Institute.

Alongside this traditional Buddhist training, Thaye Dorje has received a modern Western education from English and Australian tutors and an intensive introduction to Western philosophy from Professor Harrison Pemberton of Washington and Lee University in the United States.

Thaye Dorje currently lives in Kalimpong, India where he continues the thorough traditional education required for a holder of the Karmapa title.

On 17 May 2006, Trinley Thaye Dorje was officially appointed by the Karmapa Charitable Trust as the legal and administrative heir of the 16th Karmapa and can therefore, according to the Trust, live in Rumtek Monastery in Sikkim. However, because the monks currently in physical control of Rumtek oppose Trinley Thaye Dorje and the legal proceedings between the supporters of the two claimants have not reached a final conclusion, Trinley Thaye Dorje's headquarters remain in Kalimpong for the time being.

== Title claim ==
After the death of the 16th Karmapa in 1981, the four most senior Karma Kagyu lamas held responsibilities in his absence: the Shamar Rinpoche, the Tai Situ Rinpoche, the Jamgon Kongtrul Rinpoche and the Goshir Gyaltsab Rinpoche. Differences between them led to a divide being formed, along with claims that two different individuals are the sole, genuine reincarnation of the 16th Karmapa. Trinley Thaye Dorje and Ogyen Trinley Dorje have each undergone separate processes of recognition, carried out by different people, at different times, in addition to separate enthronement ceremonies. Both lay claim to the title of the 17th Karmapa.

Ogyen Trinley Dorje was recognized by Situ Rinpoche and Gyaltsab Rinpoche. On June 30, 1992, following meetings with senior Karma Kagyu leaders, the 14th Dalai Lama issued an official letter with his seal of confirmation. Ogyen Trinley Dorje's enthronement ceremony took place at Tsurphu Monastery on September 27, 1992. Two years later, Trinley Thaye Dorje was recognized by Shamar Rinpoche. His enthronement ceremony took place at the Karmapa International Buddhist Institute on 17 March 1994. The 3rd Jamgon Kongtrul Rinpoche died in a car crash on April 26, 1992, prior to either recognition or enthronement ceremony.

== Marriage ==
On 29 March 2017, Karmapa officially announced his love marriage with Ms. Rinchen Yangzom, showing in this manner example of lay Buddhist practitioner like many other high teachers, including Thaye Dorje's predecessors, Chöying Dorje, 10th Karmapa and Khakyab Dorje, 15th Karmapa Lama. The couple gave birth to a son on 11 August 2018, in France, near the Karmapa's main European seat.

== See also ==
- Karmapa
- Karma Kagyu
- Karmapa controversy
- Marpa
- Khakyab Dorje
