= 4th Karmapa, Rolpe Dorje =

Gyalwa Karmapa of Kagyu Tibetan Buddhism (1340–1383)

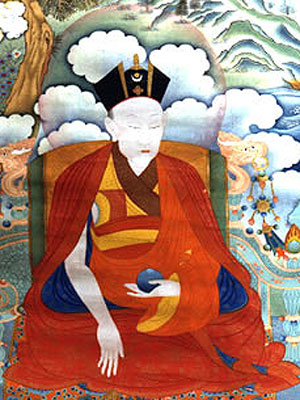
The 4th Karmapa, Rolpe Dorje

The 4th Karmapa, Rolpe Dorje (Standard Tibetan: རོལ་པའི་རྡོ་རྗེ་ེ་) (1340–1383) was the 4th Gyalwa Karmapa, the head of the Karma Kagyu subschool of the Kagyu School of Tibetan Buddhism. The 4th Karmapa's mother, while pregnant, could hear the sound of the mantra Om Mani Padme Hum while the child was in her womb, and the baby said this mantra as soon as he was born. His early life was full of miracles and he manifested a total continuity of the teachings and qualities of his former incarnation, the 3rd Karmapa, including the ability to receive teachings in his dreams.

While in his teens, he received the formal transmissions of both the Kagyu and Nyingma lineages from the great Nyingma guru Yungtönpa, the third Karmapa's spiritual heir, then very advanced in years. At the age of nineteen, he accepted Toghon Temür's invitation to return to China where he gave teachings for three years and established many temples and monasteries.

On his return to Tibet, while in the Tsongkha region, Rolpi Dorje gave lay ordination to a very special child, whom he predicted to be of great importance to Buddhism in Tibet. This was Je Tsongkhapa, the future founder of the Gelugpa school, famous for its Dalai Lamas.

When Temur died, the Mongol dynasty in China ended and the Ming dynasty began. The new emperor invited Rolpi Dorje, who declined the invitation but sent another Khenpo in his stead. Rolpi Dorje composed mystic songs throughout his life and was an accomplished poet, and fond of Indian poetics. He is also remembered for creating a huge painted thangka, following a vision of one of his students who had imagined a Buddha image over 100 metres tall. The Karmapa, on horseback, traced the Buddha's outline with hoofprints. The design was measured and traced on cloth. It took 500 workers more than a year to complete the thangka, which depicted the Gautama Buddha, the future buddha Maitreya, and the Lord of Wisdom Manjusri, all revered figures of Hinayana, Mahayana, and Vajrayana Buddhism.

The monastery of Shadzong Ritro near Taktser village, where the 14th Dalai Lama was born, was founded at the 14th century by the 4th Karmapa.

Preceded by Rangjung Dorje	Reincarnation of the Karmapa	Succeeded by Deshin Shekpa
