= 5th Karmapa, Deshin Shekpa =

Karmapa of Kagyu Tibetan Buddhism (1384–1415)

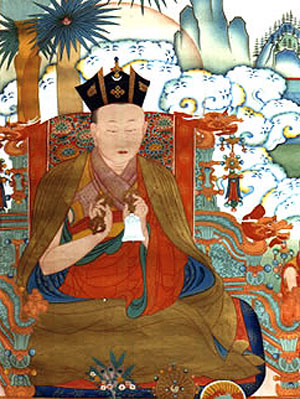
The 5th Karmapa, Deshin Shekpa

The 5th Karmapa, Deshin Shekpa (Standard Tibetan: དེ་བཞིན་གཤེགས་པ་) (1384–1415), (also Deshin Shegpa, Dezhin Shekpa, Dezhin Shegpa), was the 5th Gyalwa Karmapa, head of the Karma Kagyu, a subschool of the Kagyu School of Tibetan Buddhism. Deshin Shekpa was born in Nyang Dam in the south of Tibet. According to the lineage, he said after being born: "I am the Karmapa. Om mani padme hum shri." Deshin Shekpa was then taken to Tsawa Phu who recognized him as the reincarnation of the 4th Karmapa.

The 5th Karmapa, Deshin Shekpa traveled extensively through Tibet and Mongolia and taught people about non-violence. After having finished his education, he was invited to China in 1403 because its Yongle Emperor, Zhu Di (1402–1424) had a vision of Avalokitesvara, and also required religious ceremonies to be held for his deceased parents.

After a long journey beginning in 1403, the 5th Karmapa arrived in Nanjing, the capital of Ming China, on April 10, 1407, while riding an elephant. Arriving at the imperial palace, tens of thousands of monks greeted him. He convinced the emperor that there were different Buddhist branches for different people and that does not mean that one branch is better than the other.

The 5th Karmapa was very well received during his visit to the capital and a number of miraculous occurrences are reported. He also performed ceremonies for the emperor's family. The emperor presented him with 700 measures of silver objects and bestowed the title of 'Precious Religious King, Great Loving One of the West, Mighty Buddha of Peace'. He also gave him a material representation of the famous and ethereal 'Vajra Crown' which was said to be invisible to all except those of most pure spirit. It was woven in black brocade and studded with jewels.

Aside from religious matters, Emperor Cheng Zu wished to establish an alliance with the 5th Karmapa similar to the one the Yuan (1277–1367 CE) emperors had established with the Sakya school. The Ming emperor apparently offered to send regular armies to unify Tibet under the 5th Karmapa, but Deshin Shekpa declined.

The 5th Karmapa left Nanjing on 17 May 1408 CE. In 1410 he returned to Tsurphu Monastery where he rebuilt the monastery which had been severely damaged by an earthquake.

== Footnotes ==
Preceded by Rolpe Dorje	Reincarnation of the Karmapa	Succeeded by Thongwa Dönden
