= Sheja Dzö =

The Sheja Dzö or "Treasury of Knowledge" (Tibetan: ཤེས་བྱ་མཛོད, Wylie: shes bya mdzod) is a voluminous work by Jamgon Kongtrul (1813–1899). It is constituted by a root text in verse "The Encompassment of All Knowledge" (Tibetan: ཤེས་བྱ་ཀུན་ཁྱབ, Wylie: shes bya kun khyab) and an autocommentary in prose, 'The Infinite Ocean of Knowledge' (Tibetan: ཤེས་བྱ་མཐའ་ཡས་པའི་རྒྱ་མཚོ, Wylie: shes bya mtha' yas pa'i rgya mtsho). The Treasury of Knowledge is widely considered Jamgon Kongtrul's magnus opus, covering the full spectrum of Buddhist history according to the knowledge then current in the Himalayas; the Abhidharma through the lens of Vasubandhu (i.e. the Abhidharma-kosa and its commentaries and secondary literatures); the Buddhist philosophy preserved, categorized and developed in the Himalayas; and the many streams of Buddhist sādhanā both exoteric (sutrayana) and esoteric (vajrayana), transmitted to, maintained and developed by the many trans-Himalayan lineages, such as Mahamudra and Dzogchen. The breadth of the Sheja Dzö is encyclopedic and its approach ecumenical. The root text in verse is terse and ostensibly glib approaching telegraphic. Whereas, the tone and register of the commentary is non-sectarian in regards to the many systems of Buddhadharma it enshrines. The Sheja Dzö is the central reference and general auspice work in Rimé movement literature.

Jamgön wrote the root text and its commentary when he was fifty years old in the Tibetan calendar years of Dog and Pig, 1862-1863 CE.

As Jigdral Yeshe Dorje (2nd Dudjom Rinpoche) (1904–1987), et.al. (1991: p. 861) of the principally Nyingma view hold in respect to the expansive 'vase' (Tibetan: བུམ་པ་, Wylie: bum pa) and flow of Jamgon's mind[stream] which is evident as an aureola in his hagiographic iconography:

When the vase of Jamgön Kontrül's mind had been filled with textual exegeses and oral explanations of the transmitted precepts, treatises, tantras, transmissions and esoteric instructions, along with their rituals, practical techniques, and fine points, he too composed treatises. These form the wonderful legacy of his studies, reflections and meditations: [such as for example, his premier work...]
(i) The Store which Embraces All Knowledge (shes-bya kun-la khyab-pa'i mdzod) excellently presents the entire corpus of the sutra and mantra traditions, from the paths of the common sciences all the way up to the uncommon Great Perfection, or Atiyoga, which is the culmination of the nine vehicles...".

== English ==
All ten books of the masterwork of the Sheja Dzö are now available in English and the project was given the initial impetus and direction by Kalu Rinpoche (1905–1989).

=== Translation methodology ===
Kalu advised the translation team of three principles to guide the rendering of the Tibetan into the English:

- translating the text without interpretation or commentary, that is 'translating the words' (Tibetan: ཚིག་བསྒུར, Wylie: tshig bsgur) rather than interpreting the text or 'translating the meaning' (Tibetan: དོན་བསྒྱུར, Wylie: don bsgyur);
- "...he [Kalu] was more interested in an accurate translation than one that sacrificed accuracy for elegance...";
- "...he [Kalu] encouraged us to use a vocabulary that would be accessible to the average educated reader rather than a highly technical vocabulary that depended on prior training in Buddhist or East Asian studies...".

=== Translation team ===
==== Myriad Worlds ====
The facilities necessary for the translation team were provided by Lama Gyaltsen Ratak over a number of years. In addition, as the many who collaborated and mentored the work who have not already been mentioned in this article were not given title credit for the work and instead are known as the 'Kalu Rinpoche Translation Team' they have been quoted below:

"The translation of Myriad Worlds was largely prepared by Elio Guarisco, Könchog Tenzin, Tenpa Kalsang, Peter Roberts, Sarah Harding, Ingrid McLeod, Anthony Chapman, Ngawang Zangpo and Yeshe Wangmo; research of the citations was conducted by Lydia and Oliver Brunet; and the Introduction was written by Elio Guarisco. Grateful acknowledgement is made to several other translators with whom we collaborated: Daniel Boschero, Ken McLeod, Eric Pema Kunzang, Dechen Cronin, Norbu Tsewang, Daniel Perdue, Surya Das, and Samten Zangmo...Susan Kyser, Shawn Woodyard, and Daniel Reid for their careful revision of the final English manuscript, Kristine Paknys and David Patt for their correction of the Sanskrit, Roar Vestre for his technical assistance...".

"At every stage of the translation of Myriad Worlds, the committee has sought the advice of Tibetan and Western scholars and meditation masters. Our sincere thanks go to Bokar Trulku Rinpoché and Kenpo Lodrö Dönyö, not only for their wisdom and patience in providing answers to our many questions but also for their continued encouragement and support: To Dodrup Chen Rinpoché, Dilgo Kyentsé Rinpoché, and Nyoshul Kenpo Rinpoché for their detailed clarification of the subject of primordial purity; to Sakya Kenpo Rinpoché, Gyaltsap Rinpoché, Zenkar Rinpoché, Tara Trulku, and Kenpo Tsultrim Gyatso for their invaluable assistance in explicating the difficult points in the text; and to Pönlop Rinpoché and Karma Trinlé Rinpoché for their helpful suggestions regarding the translation."

==== English rendering ====
In the English rendering, the Sheja Dzö is divided as follows:

•Book One: Myriad Worlds (Snow Lion, 2003. ISBN 1-55939-188-X)
•Book Two: The Advent of the Buddha

Part One: The Teacher's Path to Awakening
Part Two: The Buddha's Enlightenment
Part Three: The Buddha's Twelve Deeds
Part Four: Enlightenment's Bodies and Realms

•Book Three: The Buddha's Doctrine—The Sacred Teachings

Part One: What Are the Sacred Teachings?
Part Two: Cycles of Scriptural Transmission
Part Three: Compilations of the Buddha's Word
Part Four: Origins of the Original Translations' Ancient Tradition (Nyingma)

•Book Four: Buddhism's Spread Throughout the World

Part One: Buddhism's Spread in India
Part Two: How Buddhist Monastic Discipline and Philosophy Came to Tibet
Part Three: Tibet's Eight Vehicles of Tantric Meditation Practice
Part Four: The Origins of Buddhist Culture

•Book Five: Buddhist Ethics (Snow Lion, 2003. ISBN 1-55939-191-X)
•Book Six: The Topics for Study

Part One: A Presentation of the Common Fields of Knowledge and Worldly Paths
Part Two: The General Topics of Knowledge in the Hinayana and Mahayana
Part Three: Frameworks of Buddhist Philosophy (Snow Lion, 2007. ISBN 1-55939-277-0)
Part Four: Systems of Buddhist Tantra (Snow Lion, 2005. ISBN 1-55939-210-X)

•Book Seven: The Training in Higher Wisdom

Part One: Gaining Certainty about the Keys to Understanding
Part Two: Gaining Certainty about the Provisional and Definitive Meanings in the Three Turnings of the Wheel of Dharma, the Two Truths and Dependent Arising
Part Three: Gaining Certainty about the View
Part Four: Gaining Certainty about the Four Thoughts that Turn the Mind

•Book Eight: The Training in Higher Meditative Absorption (Samadhi)

Part One, Two: Shamatha and Vipashyana; The Stages of Meditation in the Cause-Based Approaches
Part Three: The Elements of Tantric Practice (Snow Lion, 2008. ISBN 1-55939-305-X
Part Four: Esoteric Instructions, A Detailed Presentation of the Process of Meditation in Vajrayana (Snow Lion, 2008. ISBN 1-55939-284-3)

•Book Nine: An Analysis of the Paths and levels to Be Traversed

Part One: The Paths and Levels in the Cause-Based Dialectical Approach
Part Two: The Levels and Paths in the Vajrayana
Part Three: The Process of Enlightenment
Part Four: the Levels in the Three Yogas

•Book Ten: An Analysis of the Consummate Fruition State

Part One: the Fruition in the Dialectical Approach
Part Two: The More Common Attainment in the Vajrayana
Part Three: The Fruition in the Vajrayana
Part Four: The Fruition State in the Nyingma School
