= 7th Karmapa, Chödrak Gyatso =

Karmapa of Kagyu Tibetan Buddhism (1454–1506)

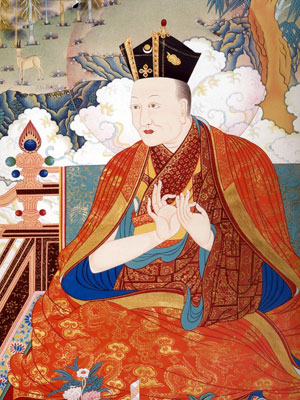
The 7th Karmapa, Chödrak Gyatso (1454–1506)

Chödrak Gyatso (Tibetan: ཆོས་གྲགས་རྒྱ་མཚོ་, Wylie: Chos grags rgya mtsho) (1454–1506), also Chödrag Gyamtso, was the seventh Karmapa, head of the Kagyu School of Tibetan Buddhism.

Chödrak Gyatso was born in Chida in the north of Tibet. According to the legend, he said at the age of five months: "There is nothing on this world, except for emptiness." He was recognized as Karmapa at the age of nine months.

According to the legend he established peace at the age of five during a tour through Tibet where in the south the tribes of Nagaland and Bhutan were engaged in a war.

He spent a large part of his life protecting animals and teaching people to give up hunting and fishing. His main activities were to prevent and solve conflicts between the tribes and building bridges and roads to connect the different areas. Chödrak send a lot of gold to India to enable the gilding of the statue of the Gautama Buddha near Bodh Gaya.

According to Karma phrin las, Dri lan yid, 91-92, his teacher, Chödrak Gyatso, interpreted the nature of shentong accepted by Rangjung Dorje, 3rd Karmapa Lama, who, in turn, had probably influenced and been influenced by the great shentong master Dolpopa Sherab Gyaltsen.

He was also an accomplished scholar, most famous for authoring the Ocean Of Logic, which is considered the most important text on pramana in the Kagyu tradition. He also authored an important commentary on Asanga's Abhisamayalankara called Lamp of the Three Worlds.

== Footnotes ==
Preceded by Thongwa Dönden	Reincarnation of the Karmapa	Succeeded by Mikyö Dorje
