= Jamgon Kongtrul =

Tibetan Buddhist scholar (1813–1899)

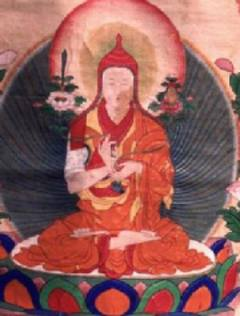
Jamgön Kongtrül Lodrö Thayé

Jamgön Kongtrül Lodrö Thayé (Tibetan: འཇམ་མགོན་ཀོང་སྤྲུལ་བློ་གྲོས་མཐའ་ཡས་, Wylie: ʽjam mgon kong sprul blo gros mthaʽ yas, 1813–1899), also known as Jamgön Kongtrül the Great, was a Tibetan Buddhist scholar, poet, artist, physician, tertön and polymath. He is credited as one of the founders of the Rimé movement (non-sectarian), compiling what is known as the "Five Great Treasuries". He achieved great renown as a scholar and writer, especially among the Nyingma and Kagyu lineages and composed over 90 volumes of Buddhist writing, including his magnum opus, The Treasury of Knowledge.

== Overview ==
Kongtrül was born in Rongyab (rong rgyab), Kham, then part of the Derge Kingdom. He was first tonsured at a Bon monastery, and then at 20 became a monk at Shechen, a major Nyingma monastery in the region, later moving on to the Kagyu Palpung monastery in 1833 under the Ninth Tai Situ, Pema Nyinje Wangpo (1775-1853). He studied many fields at Palpung, including Buddhist philosophy, tantra, medicine, architecture, poetics and Sanskrit. By thirty he had received teachings and empowerments from more than sixty masters from the different schools of Tibetan Buddhism. Kongtrül studied and practiced mainly in the Kagyu and Nyingma traditions, including Mahamudra and Dzogchen, but also studied and taught Jonang Kalachakra. He also went on tour with the fourteenth Karmapa and taught him Sanskrit. He became an influential figure in Kham and eastern Tibet, in matters of religion as well as in secular administration and diplomacy. He was influential in saving Palpung monastery when an army from the Tibetan government of Central Tibet occupied Kham in 1865.

Kongtrül was affected by the political and inter-religious conflict going on in Tibet during his life and worked together with other influential figures, mainly Jamyang Khyentse Wangpo (1820–1892) and also with the Nyingma treasure revealer Chogyur Lingpa (1829–1870) and Ju Mipham Gyatso (1846–1912). Kongtrül and his colleagues worked together to compile, exchange and revive the teachings of the Sakya, Kagyu and Nyingma, including many near-extinct teachings. This movement came to be named Rimé (Ris med), “nonsectarian,” or “impartial,” because it held that there was value in all Buddhist traditions, and all were worthy of study and preservation. According to Sam van Schaik, without this collecting and printing of rare works, the later suppression of Buddhism by the Communists would have been much more final.

Jamgon Kongtrül's personal hermitage was Kunzang Dechen Osel Ling (kun bzang bde chen 'od gsal gling), "the Garden of Auspicious Bliss and Clear Light", and was built on a rocky outcrop above Palpung monastery. It became an important center for the practice of three year retreats. This is also where he composed most of his major works. Kongtrül's works, especially his 10 volume The Treasury of Knowledge. has been very influential, especially in the Kagyu and Nyingma schools.

== Philosophy ==
Besides promoting a general inclusiveness and non-sectarian attitude towards all the different Buddhist lineages and schools, Kongtrül was known to promote a shentong view of emptiness as the highest view.

His view of Prasangika Madhyamaka is outlined in the following verse from the Treasury of Knowledge:

Conceptual imputations are abandoned; all things are merely designations.
Compounded phenomena are deceptive; nirvana is not deceptive.
The root of samsara is clinging to true existence, which generates the obscuration of the afflictive emotions.
Since the first three yanas have the same way of seeing reality, there is only one path of seeing.
All phenomena dissolve such that ones enlightenment only appears for the perception of others.

According to Kongtrül, the difference between prasangika and svatantrika Madhyamaka is:

These schools differ in the way the ultimate view is generated in one's being. There is no difference in what they assert the ultimate nature to be. All the great scholars who are unbiased say that both of these schools are authentic Madhyamaka.

Kongtrül also held that "Shentong Madhyamaka" was a valid form of Madhyamaka, which was also based on the Buddha nature teachings of the third turning and Nagarjuna's "Collection of Praises". For him, this Shentong Madhyamaka is the view which holds that the Ultimate truth, the "primordial wisdom nature, the dharmata":

ways exists in its own nature and never changes, so it is never empty of its own nature and it is there all the time.

However, he makes it clear that "The Shentong view is free of the fault of saying that the ultimate is an entity." Furthermore, Kongtrül states:

The ultimate truth is the primordial wisdom of emptiness free of elaborations. Primordial wisdom is there in its very nature and is present within the impure, mistaken consciousness. Even while consciousness is temporarily stained, it remains in the wisdom nature. The defilements are separable and can be abandoned because they are not the true nature. Therefore, the ultimate truth is also free of the two extremes of nihilism and eternalism. Since emptiness is truly established, then the extreme of nihilism is avoided; and since all phenomena and concepts of subject-object grasping do not truly exist, then the extreme of eternalism is avoided.

Finally, on the difference between Rangtong and Shentong, Kongtrül writes in the Treasury of Knowledge:

For both Rangtong and Shentong the relative level is empty, and in meditation, all fabricated extremes have ceased. However, they differ in their terminology about whether dharmata is there or not there in post-meditation, and in the ultimate analysis, whether primordial wisdom is truly established or not.

Shentong says that if the ultimate truth had no established nature and was a mere absolute negation, then it would be a vacuous nothingness. Instead, the ultimate is nondual, self-aware primordial wisdom. Shentong presents a profound view which joins the sutras and tantras.

== Tulkus ==
There have been several recognized tulkus (incarnations) of Lodro Thaye.

=== 2nd Jamgon Kongtrul (1902–1952) ===
The biography of Khakyab Dorje, 15th Karmapa Lama mentions he had a vision in which he saw 25 simultaneous emanations of the master Jamgön Kongtrül. Preeminent among these was Karsé Kongtrül (Tibetan: ཀར་སྲས་ཀོང་སྤྲུལ་, Wylie: kar sras kong sprul, 1904–10 May 1952). Karsé Kongtrül was born as the son of the 15th Karmapa: Karsé means "son of the Karmapa". His formal religious name was as Jamyang Khyentsé Özer (Wylie: 'jam dbyangs mkhyen brtse'i 'od zer).

Karsé Kongtrül was identified and enthroned by his father at age twelve in 1902, in Samdrub Choling at the monastery of Dowolung Tsurphu. Karsé Kongtrül resided at Tsadra Rinchen Drak, the seat of his predecessor in eastern Tibet. He received the full education and lineage transmission from the Karmapa. Among his other teachers were Surmang Trungpa Chökyi Nyinche, the 10th Trungpa tulku. He attained realization of the ultimate lineage, was one of the most renowned Mahamudra masters and transmitted the innermost teachings to Rangjung Rigpe Dorje, 16th Karmapa. On many occasions he gave teachings, empowerments, and reading transmissions from the old and new traditions, such as the Treasury of Precious Termas (Rinchen Terdzö), and he rebuilt the retreat center of Tsandra Rinchen Drak, his residence at Palpung Monastery. Karsé Kongtrül died on 10 May 1952 at the age of 49.

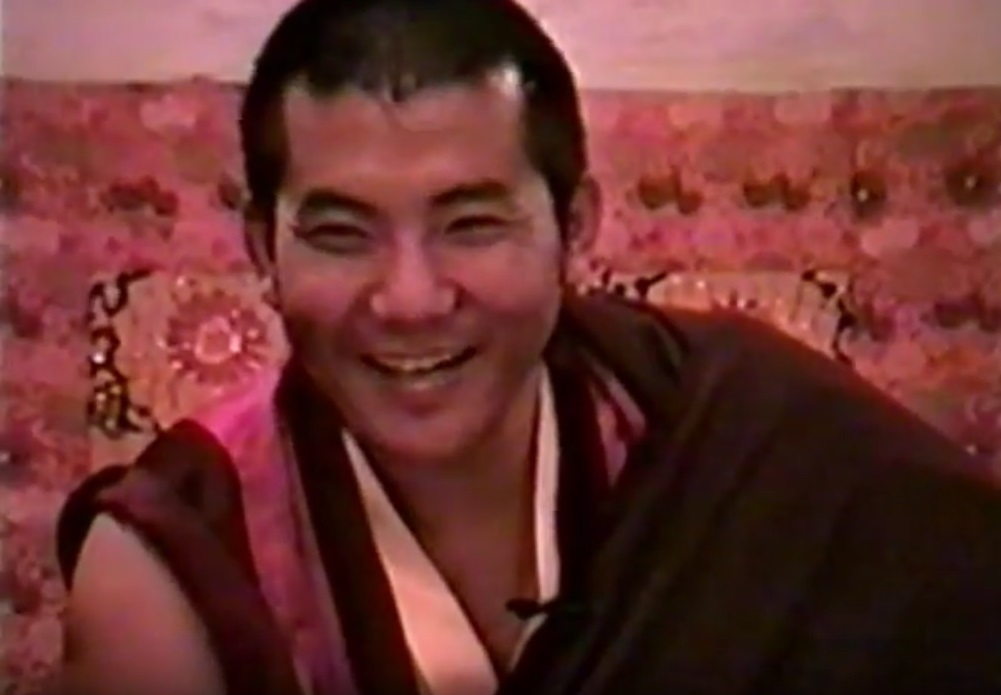
3rd Jamgon Kongtrul Rinpoche

=== 3rd Jamgon Kongtrul (1954–1992) ===
The 3rd Jamgon Kongtrul, Karma Lodrö Chökyi Senge, a tulku of Khyentse Özer, was born on 1 October 1954 matrilineal grandson of (later Lt Gen) Ngapoi Ngawang Jigme. He fled to India in 1959 in the aftermath of the 1959 Tibetan uprising and grew up at Rumtek Monastery in Sikkim under the care of Rangjung Rigpe Dorje, 16th Karmapa. Recognized as an incarnation of the previous Jamgon Kongtrul by the Karmapa.

Jamgon Kongtrul Rinpoche travelled with the Karmapa to the United States in 1976 and 1980. He engaged in building monasteries and initiated plans for a home for the elderly and a health clinic in Nepal.

On 26 April 1992, a mysterious accident occurred in Darjeeling District, India, with Jamgon Kongtrul as a passenger, when a new BMW veered off the road into a tree. He was thirty-seven years old. The accident took place near Rinpoche's monastery and a residential school that he founded for young monks and orphans.

=== 4th Jamgon Kongtrul (1995 to present) ===
The 4th Jamgon Kongtrul, Lodro Choyki Nyima Tenpey Dronme, was born in the wood pig year in Central Tibet on the 26th of November 1995. His birth was prophesied by the Seventeenth Karmapa, Ogyen Trinley Dorje, who also recognised, confirmed the authenticity of his incarnation, and proclaimed it to the world. The prophecy, the search, and the recognition of the Fourth Jamgon Kongtrul Rinpoche are told in the book E MA HO! published by the Jamgon Kongtrul Labrang and can be obtained from Pullahari Monastery and viewed on www.jamgonkongtrul.org. He spent time between Kagyu Tekchen Ling and Pullahari Monastery, the monastic seats in India and Nepal founded by the Third Jamgon Kongtrul Rinpoche. Jamgon Kongtrul Labrang gave his studies, training, and the receiving transmissions from the Lineage Masters. Annually, he also attended the Kagyu Monlam in Bodhgaya, India, led by the Seventeenth Gyalwa Karmapa, and led the Kagyu Monlam in Kathmandu, Nepal. On April 14, 2016, the Jamgon Yangsi left Pullahari monastery and his monastic vows, stating he wanted to pursue his 'dream of becoming a doctor.

The 4th Jamgon Kongtrul Mingyur Drakpa Senge was born on 17 December 1995 in Nepal, the son of the Second Beru Khyentse. The day before he was born, the late Chogye Trichen Rinpoche said in front of many Lamas and Tulkus: "Like prophesied ... today Jamgon Rinpoche arrived."

In 1996, when the Seventeenth Karmapa Trinley Thaye Dorje, arrived in Bodhgaya, he met the young Jamgon Rinpoche for the first time. Yangsi Rinpoche despite his young age was able to spontaneously pick up some rice and toss it into the air as a mandala offering, Straight away he exclaimed: "This is the Jamgon Yangsi (Reincarnation) indeed!" He then issued a recognition letter and gave him a name Karma Migyur Drakpa Senge Trinley Kunkhyab Palzangpo.

In 1998, when the Dalai Lama was visiting Bodhgaya, the Yangsi Rinpoche had a private audience with him, where they showed him the recognition letter and the 14th Dalai Lama performed the hair cutting ceremony for the 4th Jamgon Yangsi. In 2000, Drubwang Pema Norbu (Penor Rinpoche), was invited to the Karma Monastery in Bodhgaya, and he performed the vast and profound enthronement ceremony of 4th Jamgon Kongtrul Rinpoche, again reconfirmed Jamgon Yangsi as a reincarnation of the great Jamgon Kongtrul.

During his teenage years, he studied at the Sakya College, From 2018 to 2022, Rinpoche completed a traditional Kagyu three-year retreat in Pharping, Nepal.

Rinpoche now divides his time between retreat and teaching activities.

== Works ==
The main corpus of Jamgön Kongtrül Lodrö Thaye vast scholarly activities (comprising more than ninety volumes of works in all) is known as the Great Treasuries:

- The Treasury of Encyclopedic Knowledge (shes bya kun la khyab pa'i mdzod), summarizing the entire sutric and tantric paths.
- The Treasury of Precious Instructions (gdams ngag rin po che'i mdzod), a compendium of empowerments and oral instructions of what he formulated as the "Eight Great Chariots" of the instruction lineages in Tibet.
- The Treasury of Kagyü Mantras (bka' brgyud sngags kyi mdzod), a compendium of rituals, empowerments and oral instructions for the Yangdak, Vajrakilaya and Yamantaka deities of the Nyingma kama tradition, and the tantra cycles from the Sarma lineages of Marpa and Ngok.
- The Treasury of Precious Termas (rin chen gter mdzod), a massive compilation of termas.
- The Uncommon Treasury (thun mong ma yin pa'i mdzod), which contains Jamgön Kongtrül Lodrö Thaye's own profound terma revelations.
- The Treasury of Extensive Teachings (rgya chen bka' mdzod), which includes various related works, such as praises and advice, as well as compositions on medicine, science and so on.

=== The Treasury of Knowledge ===
Jamgon Kongtrul's (1813–1899) The Infinite Ocean of Knowledge (Tibetan: ཤེས་བྱ་མཐའ་ཡས་པའི་རྒྱ་མཚོ, Wylie: shes bya mtha' yas pa'i rgya mtsho) consists of ten books or sections and is itself a commentary on the root verses 'The Encompassment of All Knowledge' (Tibetan: ཤེས་བྱ་ཀུན་ཁྱབ, Wylie: shes bya kun khyab) which is also the work of Jamgon Kongtrul. The Encompassment of All Knowledge are the root verses to Kongtrul's autocommentary The Infinite Ocean of Knowledge and these two works together are known as 'The Treasury of Knowledge' (Tibetan: ཤེས་བྱ་མཛོད, Wylie: shes bya mdzod). Tibetan Text

Of the Five, the Treasury of Knowledge was Jamgon Kongtrul's magnum opus, covering the full spectrum of Buddhist history, philosophy and practice. There is an ongoing effort to translate it into English. It is divided up as follows:

- Book One: Myriad Worlds (Snow Lion, 2003. ISBN 1-55939-188-X)
- Book Two: The Advent of the Buddha (parts 2, 3, and 4 forthcoming)
  Part One: The Teacher's Path to Awakening
  Part Two: The Buddha's Enlightenment
  Part Three: The Buddha's Twelve Deeds
  Part Four: Enlightenment's Bodies and Realms
- Book Three: The Buddha's Doctrine—The Sacred Teachings
  Part One: What Are the Sacred Teachings?
  Part Two: Cycles of Scriptural Transmission
  Part Three: Compilations of the Buddha's Word
  Part Four: Origins of the Original Translations' Ancient Tradition (Nyingma)
- Book Four: Buddhism's Spread Throughout the World
  Part One: Buddhism's Spread in India
  Part Two: How Buddhist Monastic Discipline and Philosophy Came to Tibet
  Part Three: Tibet's Eight Vehicles of Tantric Meditation Practice
  Part Four: The Origins of Buddhist Culture
- Book Five: Buddhist Ethics (Snow Lion, 2003. ISBN 1-55939-191-X)
- Book Six: The Topics for Study
  Part One: A Presentation of the Common Fields of Knowledge and Worldly Paths
  Part Two: The General Topics of Knowledge in the Hinayana and Mahayana
  Part Three: Frameworks of Buddhist Philosophy (Snow Lion, 2007. ISBN 1-55939-277-0)
  Part Four: Systems of Buddhist Tantra (Snow Lion, 2005. ISBN 1-55939-210-X)
- Book Seven: The Training in Higher Wisdom
  Part One: Gaining Certainty about the Keys to Understanding
  Part Two: Gaining Certainty about the Provisional and Definitive Meanings in the Three Turnings of the Wheel of Dharma, the Two Truths and Dependent Arising
  Part Three: Gaining Certainty about the View
  Part Four: Gaining Certainty about the Four Thoughts that Turn the Mind
- Book Eight: The Training in Higher Meditative Absorption (Samadhi)
  Part One, Two: Shamatha and Vipashyana; The Stages of Meditation in the Cause-Based Approaches (forthcoming)
  Part Three: The Elements of Tantric Practice (Snow Lion, 2008). ISBN 1-55939-305-X
  Part Four: Esoteric Instructions, A Detailed Presentation of the Process of Meditation in Vajrayana (Snow Lion, 2008. ISBN 1-55939-284-3)
- Book Nine: An Analysis of the Paths and levels to Be Traversed (forthcoming)
  Part One: The Paths and Levels in the Cause-Based Dialectical Approach
  Part Two: The Levels and Paths in the Vajrayana
  Part Three: The Process of Enlightenment
  Part Four: the Levels in the Three Yogas
- Book Ten: An Analysis of the Consummate Fruition State (forthcoming)
  Part One: the Fruition in the Dialectical Approach
  Part Two: The More Common Attainment in the Vajrayana
  Part Three: The Fruition in the Vajrayana
  Part Four: The Fruition State in the Nyingma School

=== Other works published in English translation ===
- Jamgon Kongtrul's Retreat Manual. Translated by Ngawang Zangpo. Snow Lion Publications. 1994. ISBN 1-55939-029-8.
- Enthronement: The Recognition of the Reincarnate Masters of Tibet and the Himalayas. Snow Lion Publications. 1997. ISBN 1-55939-083-2.
- Padmasambhava; Jamgon Kongtrul (1999). Light of Wisdom. Vol. 1. Translated by Erik Pema Kunsang. Rangjung Yeshe Publications. ISBN 962-7341-37-1.
- Padmasambhava; Jamgon Kongtrul (1999). Light of Wisdom. Vol. II. Translated by Erik Pema Kunsang. Rangjung Yeshe Publications. ISBN 962-7341-33-9.
- The Teacher-Student Relationship. Snow Lion Publications. 1999. ISBN 1-55939-096-4.
- Arya Maitreya; Jamgon Kongtrul Lodro Thaye; Khenpo Tsultrim Gyamtso Rinpoche (2000). Buddha Nature, The Mahayana Uttaratantra Shastra with Commentary. Snow Lion. ISBN 1-55939-128-6.
- Essence of Benefit and Joy. Siddhi Publications. 2000. ISBN 0-9687689-5-4.
- The Great Path of Awakening : The Classic Guide to Using the Mahayana Buddhist Slogans to Tame the Mind and Awaken the Heart. Translated by Ken McLeod. Shambhala. 2000. ISBN 1-57062-587-5.
- The Torch of Certainty. Shambhala. 2000. ISBN 1-57062-713-4.
- Padmasambhava; Jamgon Kongtrul (2001). Light of Wisdom. Vol. IV. Translated by Erik Pema Kunsang. Rangjung Yeshe Publications. ISBN 962-7341-43-6. (restricted circulation)
- Sacred Ground: Jamgon Kongtrul on Pilgrimage and Sacred Geography. Snow Lion Publications. 2001. ISBN 1-55939-164-2.
- Creation and Completion: Essential Points of Tantric Meditation. Translated by Sarah Harding. Wisdom Publications. 2002. ISBN 0-86171-312-5.
- The Autobiography of Jamgon Kongtrul: A Gem of Many Colors. Translated by Richard Barron. Snow Lion Publications. 2003. ISBN 1-55939-184-7.
- Timeless Rapture: Inspired Verse from the Shangpa Masters. Snow Lion. 2003. ISBN 1-55939-204-5.

== See also ==
- Simhamukha
