= 14th Karmapa, Theckchok Dorje =

Karmapa of Kagyu Tibetan Buddhism (1798–1868)

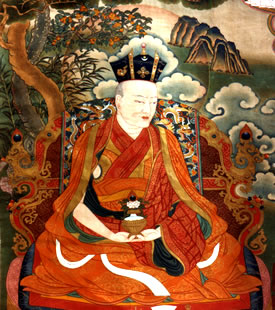

Personal life
- Born: 1798; Danang, Tibet

Religious life
- Religion: Tibetan Buddhism
- School: Kagyu

Senior posting
- Predecessor: 13th Karmapa, Dudul Dorje
- Successor: 15th Karmapa, Khakyab Dorje

The 14th Karmapa, Theckchok Dorje (1798–1868), also Thegchog Dorje, was the 14th Gyalwa Karmapa, head of the Kagyu School of Tibetan Buddhism. Theckchok Dorje was born in Danang, Kham, Tibet, and was recognized by Drukchen Kunzig Chokyi Nangwa based on the instructional letter from the 13th Karmapa, Dudul Dorje that detailed where his next reincarnation would be born. He was enthroned and ordained as a monk by the 9th Tai Situpa at the age of nineteen.

Theckchok Dorje traveled extensively through Tibet, and was very active in the Rimé movement. He and other participants in the movement were especially interested in the exchange of knowledge between their own Kagyu school and the Nyingma school, and the Karmapa folded the Nyingma Terton Chogyur Lingpa's rituals into the Tsurphu ritual calendar. Chogyur Lingpa also has specific visions of the future Karmapas. Theckchok Dorje's interests were also in poetry, sculpture, and the dialectics.

His spiritual successor was Jamgon Kongtrul Lodro Thaye, and his detailed incarnation instruction letter for locating the 15th Karmapa had been prepared by the time of his death at the age of 71.

Preceded by Dudul Dorje	Reincarnation of the Karmapa	Succeeded by Khakyab Dorje
