= 10th Karmapa, Chöying Dorje =

Karmapa of Kagyu Tibetan Buddhism (1604–1674)

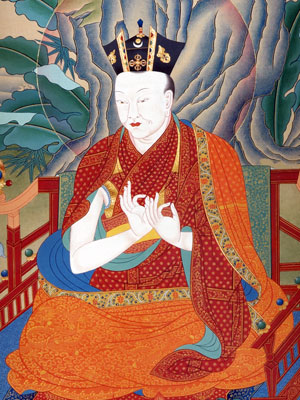
The 10th Karmapa, Chöying Dorje (1604–1674)

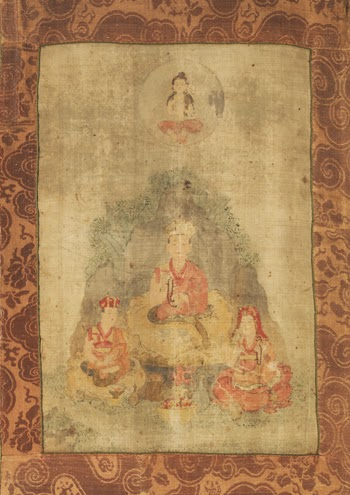
Actual self-portrait of painted thangka between 1648 and 1671 by the 10th Karmapa himself, while in Gyalthang, Tibet. On the Karmapa's right is Kunto Zangpo (the Karmapa's faithful attendant) and on the left is the Sixth Gyaltsab Norbu Zangpo. Chenrezig is at the top.

Chöying Dorje (1604–1674) was the tenth Karmapa or head of the Kagyu school of Tibetan Buddhism.

Chöying Dorje was born in the kingdom of Golok, Amdo. At the age of eight, he was recognized by Shamar Mipam Chökyi Wangchuk, the sixth Shamarpa and received the complete Kagyu transmissions.

During his life, Tibet faced inner instability as a pro-Kagyu king suppressed - against the will of the Karmapa - the Gelug school and forbade the search for the reincarnation of the Dalai Lama. The regent of the Gelug asked Güshi Khan, the warrior king of the Khoshut Mongols, for help.

The Mongolian army attacked Shigatse and forced many monasteries to convert to the Gelug school. The civil war became such that Chöying Dorje had to flee Tibet and he appointed Goshir Gyaltsab as the temporary regent. The Kagyu school was almost completely annihilated in Tsang province, however, it remained in the provinces of Amdo and Kham.

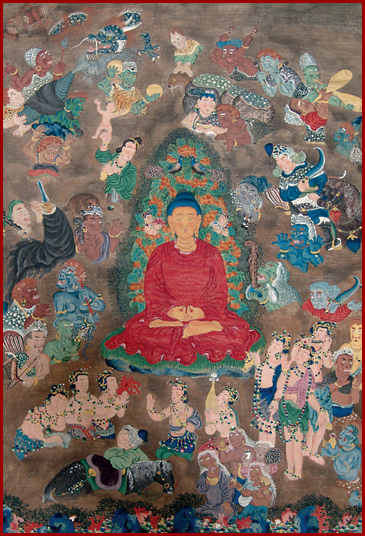
Scene from Gautama Buddha’s life story by the Tenth Karmapa

== Exile ==
During his exile (1648 to 1672), Chöying Dorje travelled extensively through Bhutan, Amdo and Kham in East Tibet, Burma and Nepal, founding monasteries along his route. Traveling through dangerous lands he often concealed his identity, wearing common clothes, and was at times robbed and reduced too begging for food in a region he didn't speak the dialect. He wrote books on various subjects, composed songs and made an enormous number of paintings and sculptures. Also, while in exile he returned his monks vows and had a family.

== Family and children ==
It's likely when Karmapa was in the far southeast of Tibet for a period of twelve years, is when he took a consort. He fathered several sons and daughters. One of his sons, Norbu Zangpo, who was recognized as the Sixth Tsurpu Gyeltsab (c.1659-1698). Karmapa enthroned his 3-year-old son Norbu Zangpo in a temple he helped build in Gyeltang with his bare hands. In 1667 the Karmapa brought him to Riknga Temple and performed novice ordination. In 1672 the Karmapa returned to central Tibet with a large entourage that included his wife, sons, and daughters. Most likely the main reason for returning was to arrange the installment of his son Norbu Zangpo at Tsurpu.

== Return to Central Tibet ==
After twenty-four years of exile, the Kagyu school was no longer the dominant school of Tibetan Buddhism. In 1674 the 5th Dalai Lama met with Chöying Dorje at the Potala Palace, and the reconciliation was welcomed by all after the many conflicts and difficulties. However, Chöying Dorje was not allowed by the Dalai Lama to return to his monastery at Tsurpu.

== Art ==
Within the Tibetan artistic heritage, Chöying Dorje is perhaps the most exceptional artist of all times. The various biographies agree that the 10th Karmapa was a talented painter and sculptor already at a young age. It is also repeatedly stated that he was from a young age especially fond of Indian statues from Kashmir. This explains why many of the statues made by the Tenth Karmapa – regardless whether cast in metal or carved in ivory, wood, or conch shell, etc. – are stylistically very close to brass statues from Kashmir and Swat.

However, Chöying Dorje was not simply copying ancient Indian and Tibetan works. Just inspired, he rather created his own work of art – albeit using ancient stylistic elements. As mentioned in his biographies, he had ample opportunity to study early statues during his recurring visits to the Jokhang temple in Lhasa. His activities as a painter were evidently influenced by the Chinese tradition, which also explains why Chöying Dorje painted many works on silk. Chinese influence in the works of Chöying Dorje has its origin in arhat paintings that he had seen in Tibet and copied several times. The Tenth Karmapa also encountered other Chinese silk paintings during his exile in Lijiang, where he stayed for several years at the court of the local ruler. Chöying Dorje also created paintings influenced by Kashmir and Western Tibetan styles.

Preceded by Wangchuk Dorje	Reincarnation of the Karmapa	Succeeded by Yeshe Dorje
