= 15th Karmapa, Khakyab Dorje =

Karmapa of Kagyu Tibetan Buddhism

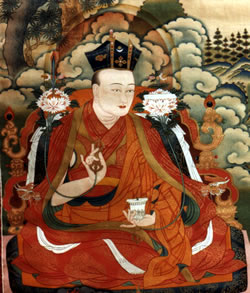

Personal life
- Born: Khakyab Dorje; 1871 Sheikor, Tibet
- Died: 1922 (aged 50–51)

Religious life
- Religion: Tibetan Buddhism
- School: Kagyu
- Lineage: Karmapa

Senior posting
- Predecessor: 14th Karmapa, Theckchok Dorje
- Successor: 16th Karmapa, Rangjung Rigpe Dorje

The 15th Karmapa, Khakyab Dorje (Tibetan: མཁའ་ཁྱབ་རྡོ་རྗེ; 1871–1922 or 1870–1921) was born in Sheikor village in Tsang, central Tibet. Sources state that at his birth he spoke the Chenrezig mantra, and at five he was able to read scriptures. He was recognized as the 15th Karmapa, and enthroned at six years of age by the 9th Kyabgon Drukchen.

Khakyab Dorje had at least five consorts, and two of his sons were recognized as great tulkus. The 15th Karmapa's numerous sons and daughters were instrumental in reviving several eastern Tibetan transmission lineages that were at risk of dying out.

== Education ==
Khakhyap Dorjé received the Kagyu transmission from Jamgon Kongtrul, including the instructions of the Five Treasures that Kongtrul had compiled in over one hundred volumes, teachings and practices from the Rimé movement. Trashi Özer and other masters completed his education.

== Life and legacy ==
In 1898 Khakhyap Dorjé travelled to Bhutan where he bestowed many transmissions. On his return to Tibet, he took several consorts. Female wisdom and inspiration are necessary to find the hidden teachings of Guru Rinpoche and Yeshe Tsogyal known as termas. With few exceptions, a Tertön must have a consort. At the time of Guru Rinpoche, Karmapa was one of 25 of his main students, with the name Gyalwa Choyang. (Naher 2004, p. 222) Khakyab Dorje married Dāki Wangmo, bore three sons, one of whom, Khyentsé Özer, was recognised as the Second Jamgon Kongtrul (Martin 2003, p. 290) and another, Jamyang Rinpoché, an unrecognised Shamarpa (d. circa 1947). He composed a special text explaining how to return one's vows.

Among his closest students were the 11th Tai Situpa, whom Karmapa recognised as the Situpa reincarnation, Karma Jamyang Khyentsé Özer, and the First Beru Khyentse.

== See also ==
- Urgyen Tsomo

== Footnotes ==
Preceded by Thekchok Dorje	Reincarnation of the Karmapa	Succeeded by Rangjung Rigpe Dorje
