= 11th Karmapa, Yeshe Dorje =

Karmapa of Kagyu Tibetan Buddhism (1676–1702)

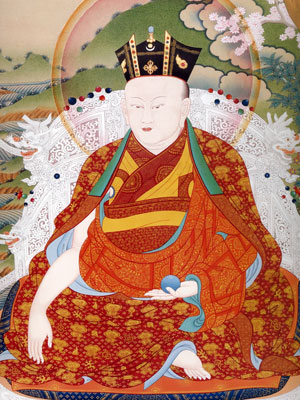
The 11th Karmapa, Yeshe Dorje (1676–1702)

Yeshe Dorje (1676–1702) was the eleventh Gyalwa Karmapa, head of the Kagyu School of Tibetan Buddhism.

Yeshe Dorje was born in Mayshö, Kham. He was discovered by Minjur Dorje and recognized by Shamar Yeshe Nyinpo, the seventh Shamarpa. Yeshe Dorje was transferred to Central Tibet for his education and was ordained in the Tsurphu Monastery. He received an education both in the Kagyu school as well as the Nyingma school. Yeshe Dorje integrated the teaching of Tercho by Padmasambhava in the Kagyu school.

He was the shortest-lived of all the Karmapas. Like the 10th Karmapa before him, he left a detailed letter referring to his next incarnation.

== Footnotes ==
Preceded by Chöying Dorje	Reincarnation of the Karmapa	Succeeded by Changchub Dorje
