= Goshir Gyaltsab =

Incarnate lama in the Karma Kagyu lineage of Tibetan Buddhism

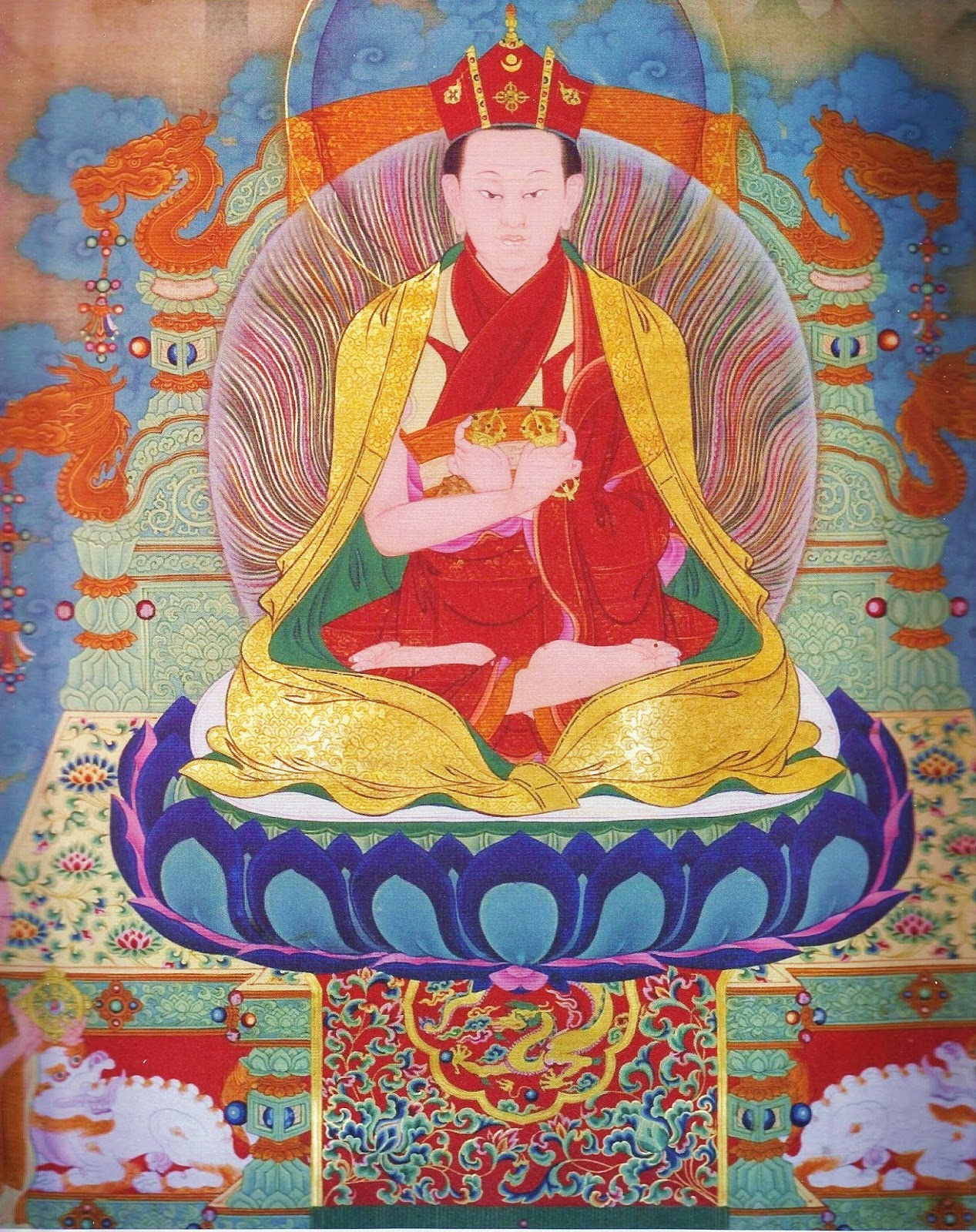

Goshir Gyaltsab Rinpoche (Tibetan: རྒྱལ་ཚབ།, Wylie: Rgyal-tshab) is a leading incarnate lama (tulku) in the Karma Kagyu lineage of Tibetan Buddhism. He is considered as emanation of Bodhisattva Vajrapani.

The first Gyaltsab Rinpoche Paljor Dondrub (1427–1489) was born in Nyemo Yakteng and received the title Goshir (Tibetan: གོ་ཤྲི, Wylie: go shri; Chinese: 國師; lit. 'state teacher') from the Emperor of China. In Tibet, Gyaltsab Rinpoche is known as Tsurphu Goshir Gyaltsab Rinpoche. He is the regent looking after Tsurphu monastery and the interests of the Karmapas in between two Karmapas. In Tsurphu, Gyaltsab Rinpoche's monastery Chogar Gong lies directly behind Karmapa's monastery.

Gyaltsab Rinpoche was recognized by the Sixteenth Karmapa before he was born in 1954 and after the official enthronement by the 16th Karmapa in 1959, Gyaltsab Rinpoche made the journey to Sikkim together with the Karmapa.

== List of Gyaltsab Rinpoches ==
1. Paljor Dondrub (1427–1489)
2. Tashi Namgyal (1490–1518)
3. Drakpo Paljor (1519–1549)
4. Dragpa Dundrub (1550–1617)
5. Dragpa Choyang (1618–1658)
6. Norbu Zangpo (1660–1698)
7. Konchog Ozer (1699–1765)
8. Chophal Zangpo (1766–1817)
9. Yeshe Zangpo (1821–1876)
10. Tenpe Nyima (1877–1901)
11. Dragpa Gyatso (1902–1949)
12. Dragpa Tenpa Yarpel (1954–present)
