= 12th Karmapa, Changchub Dorje =

Karmapa of Kagyu Tibetan Buddhism (1703–1732)

12th Karmapa
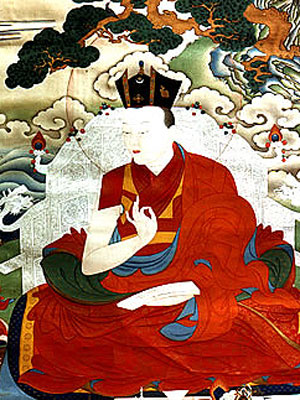
- Date of birth: 1703
- Place of birth: Chile Chakhor, Derge, Kham, Tibet.
- Birth name: Changchub Dorje
- Date of death: 1732
- Place of death: China
- School: Vajrayana
- Practice School: Kagyu
- Lineage: Karma Kagyu
- Order: N/A
- Titles/Honours: Karmapa, Lama, Rinpoche.
- Quote: ?

Changchub Dorje (1703–1732), also Chanchub Dorje, was the twelfth Gyalwa Karmapa, head of the Kagyu School of Tibetan Buddhism.

Changchub Dorje was born in Chile Chakhor in the kingdom of Derge in Kham. According to the legend, he said at the age of two months: "I am Karmapa." He was discovered by a search party and was recognized as Karmapa by Palchen Chökyi Döndrup, the eighth Shamarpa.

Tibet had become politically unstable during the reign of the 7th Dalai Lama, because the Dzungars and China tried to gain control of the government. Changchub Dorje and the eighth Shamarpa decided to make a Buddhist pilgrimage to Nepal, India and China. After they returned, they were once again invited by the emperor of China, however both the Karmapa and the Shamarpa got sick during the journey and died of smallpox.

Preceded by Yeshe Dorje	Reincarnation of the Karmapa	Succeeded by Dudul Dorje
