= 13th Karmapa, Dudul Dorje =

Karmapa of Kagyu Tibetan Buddhism (1733–1797)

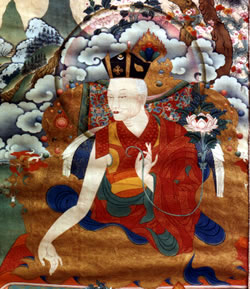

Personal life
- Born: 1733; Champa Drongsar, Tibet
- Died: 1797 (aged 63–64)

Religious life
- Religion: Tibetan Buddhism
- School: Kagyu
- Lineage: Karmapa

Senior posting
- Predecessor: 12th Karmapa, Changchub Dorje
- Successor: 14th Karmapa, Theckchok Dorje

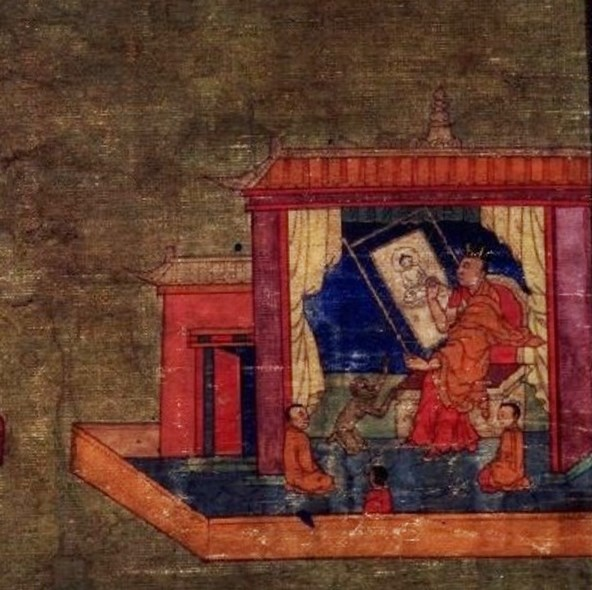
Dudul Dorje, 13th Karmapa, detail of 19th-century painting from the Rubin Museum of Art

The 13th Karmapa, Dudul Dorje (1733–1797) was the 13th Gyalwa Karmapa, head of the Kagyu school of Tibetan Buddhism. Born in Champa Drongsar and recognized by Gyaltsab Rinpoche at the age of four, he received an education in the monastery from the age of eight by both the Kagyu and the Nyingma schools. Dudul Dorje became head of the school at the age of 31. He was known for his great love for animals.

According to sources, he rescued the Jokhang temple in Lhasa from flooding by placing a kata (white scarf) over the statue of Jowo Shakyamuni Buddha.

Preceded by Changchub Dorje	Reincarnation of the Karmapa	Succeeded by Thekchok Dorje
