= Karmapa =

Tulku lineage of the Tibetan Buddhist Karma Kagyu

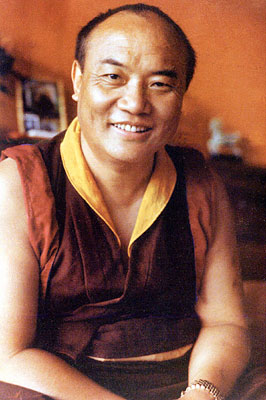
- The 16th Karmapa, Rangjung Rigpe Dorje (1924–1981)

Tibetan name
- Tibetan: རྒྱལ་དབང་ཀརྨ་པ་
Transcriptions
- Wylie: rgyal ba karma pa
- Tibetan Pinyin: Garmaba
- Lhasa IPA: [kaːmapa]

Chinese name
- Traditional Chinese: 噶瑪巴
- Simplified Chinese: 噶玛巴
Transcriptions
Standard Mandarin
- Hanyu Pinyin: gámǎbā

Karmapa's flag

The Karmapa Tulku lineage of the Gyalwa Karmapa is the oldest among the major incarnating lineages of Tibetan Buddhism, established in 1110 CE by the 1st Karmapa, Düsum Khyenpa. Karmapa means "the one who carries out buddha-activity", or "the embodiment of all the activities of the buddhas". A total of 17 Karmapa manifestations have incarnated after their predecessors predict their own rebirths in detailed letters.

Their honorific titles include His Holiness the Gyalwa Karmapa (རྒྱལ་བ་, lit. 'Victorious One', and more formally as Gyalwang (རྒྱལ་དབང་ཀརྨ་པ་, lit. 'King of Victorious Ones') The Karmapa is the head of the Karma Kagyu, the largest sub-school of the Kagyu school (བཀའ་བརྒྱུད bka' brgyud), itself one of the four major schools of Tibetan Buddhism.

The main seat of the four Tibetan seats of the Karmapas is the Tsurphu Monastery in U-Tsang, along the Tolung valley of central Tibet. The Karmapa's seat built during the Tibetan diaspora is the Dharma Chakra Centre at Rumtek Monastery in Sikkim, India. The international monastic seats are Karma Triyana Dharmachakra in New York and Dhagpo Kagyu Ling in Dordogne, France, and in Dominica.

Born in 1985, it was a few years after the 17th Karmapa, Orgyen Trinley Dorje was located and then recognized in 1992 by the Dalai Lama, and by the Chinese Central Government, that another Karmapa was recognized by Shamar Rinpoche, Trinley Thaye Dorje. The identity of the current 17th Karmapa was resolved by the Karmapas themselves, Orgyen Trinley Dorje and Trinley Thaye Dorje, both of whom issued a joint statement on 4 December 2023.

== Origin of the lineage ==
Düsum Khyenpa, 1st Karmapa Lama (Wylie: Dus gsum Mkhyen pa, 1110–1193), was a disciple of the Tibetan master Gampopa. A talented child who studied Buddhism with his father from an early age and who sought out great teachers in his twenties and thirties, he is said to have attained enlightenment at the age of fifty while practicing dream yoga. He was henceforth regarded by the contemporary highly respected masters Shakya Śri and Lama Shang as the Karmapa, a manifestation of Avalokiteśvara, whose coming was predicted in the Samadhiraja Sutra and the Laṅkāvatāra Sūtra.

The source of the oral lineage, traditionally traced back to the Buddha Vajradhara, was transmitted to the Indian master of mahamudra and tantra called Tilopa (989–1069), through Naropa (1016–1100) to Marpa Lotsawa and Milarepa. These forefathers of the Kagyu (Bka' brGyud) lineage are collectively called the "Golden Rosary".

== Recognition of the Karmapa ==
The Karmapa is a long line of consciously reborn lamas, and the second Karmapa, Karma Pakshi (1204–1283), is the first recognized tulku (Wylie: sprul sku) in Tibetan Buddhism who predicted the circumstances of his rebirth.

A Karmapa's identity is confirmed through a combination realized lineage teachers supernatural insight, prediction letters left by the previous Karmapa, and the young child's own self-proclamation and ability to identify objects and people known to its previous incarnation.

=== Conflicts in recognitions ===
The 8th, 10th, and 12th incarnations, as well as the widely renowned 16th Karmapa, each faced conflicts during their recognition, which were ultimately resolved. There is currently a controversy over the enthronement of two 17th Karmapas.

== Black Crown ==
The Karmapas are the holders of the Black Crown (Wylie: Zhwa-nag) and are thus sometimes known as "the Black Hat Lamas". This crown (Wylie: rang 'byung cod pan, 'self-arisen crown'), is traditionally said to have been woven by the dakinis from their hair and given to the Karmapa in recognition of his spiritual realization. The physical crown displayed by the Karmapas was offered to Deshin Shekpa, 5th Karmapa Lama by the Yongle Emperor of China as a material representation of the spiritual one.

The crown was last known to be located at Rumtek Monastery in Sikkim, the last home of the 16th Karmapa, although that location has been subject to some upheaval since 1993 causing some to worry as to whether or not it is still there. An inventory of items remaining at Rumtek is purported to be something the Indian government is going to undertake in the near future.

== List of previous Karmapas ==
1. Düsum Khyenpa (དུས་གསུམ་མཁྱེན་པ་) (1110–1193)
2. Karma Pakshi (ཀརྨ་པཀྵི་) (1204–1283)
3. Rangjung Dorje (རང་འབྱུང་རྡོ་རྗེ་) (1284–1339)
4. Rolpe Dorje (རོལ་པའི་རྡོ་རྗེ་) (1340–1383)
5. Deshin Shekpa (དེ་བཞིན་གཤེགས་པ་)(1384–1415)
6. Thongwa Dönden (མཐོང་བ་དོན་ལྡན་) (1416–1453)
7. Chödrak Gyatso (ཆོས་གྲགས་རྒྱ་མཚོ་) (1454–1506)
8. Mikyö Dorje (མི་བསྐྱོད་རྡོ་རྗེ་) (1507–1554)
9. Wangchuk Dorje (དབང་ཕྱུག་རྡོ་རྗེ་) (1556–1603)
10. Chöying Dorje (ཆོས་དབྱིངས་རྡོ་རྗེ་) (1604–1674)
11. Yeshe Dorje (ཡེ་ཤེས་རྡོ་རྗེ་) (1676–1702)
12. Changchub Dorje (བྱང་ཆུབ་རྡོ་རྗེ་) (1703–1732)
13. Dudul Dorje (བདུད་འདུལ་རྡོ་རྗེ་) (1733–1797)
14. Thekchok Dorje (ཐེག་མཆོག་རྡོ་རྗེ་) (1798–1868)
15. Khakyab Dorje (མཁའ་ཁྱབ་རྡོ་རྗེ་) (1871–1922)
16. Rangjung Rigpe Dorje (རང་འབྱུང་རིག་པའི་རྡོ་རྗེ་) (1924–1981)
17. Ogyen Trinley Dorje (ཨོ་རྒྱན་འཕྲིན་ལས་རྡོ་རྗེ།) (b. 1985) or Trinley Thaye Dorje (ཕྲིན་ལས་མཐའ་ཡས་རྡོ་རྗེ།) (b. 1983)

== See also ==
- Dorje Pakmo
- Drikungpa
- Shamarpa
- Thrangu Rinpoche
