= Khenpo Karthar Rinpoche =

Tibetan Buddhist lama (1924–2019)

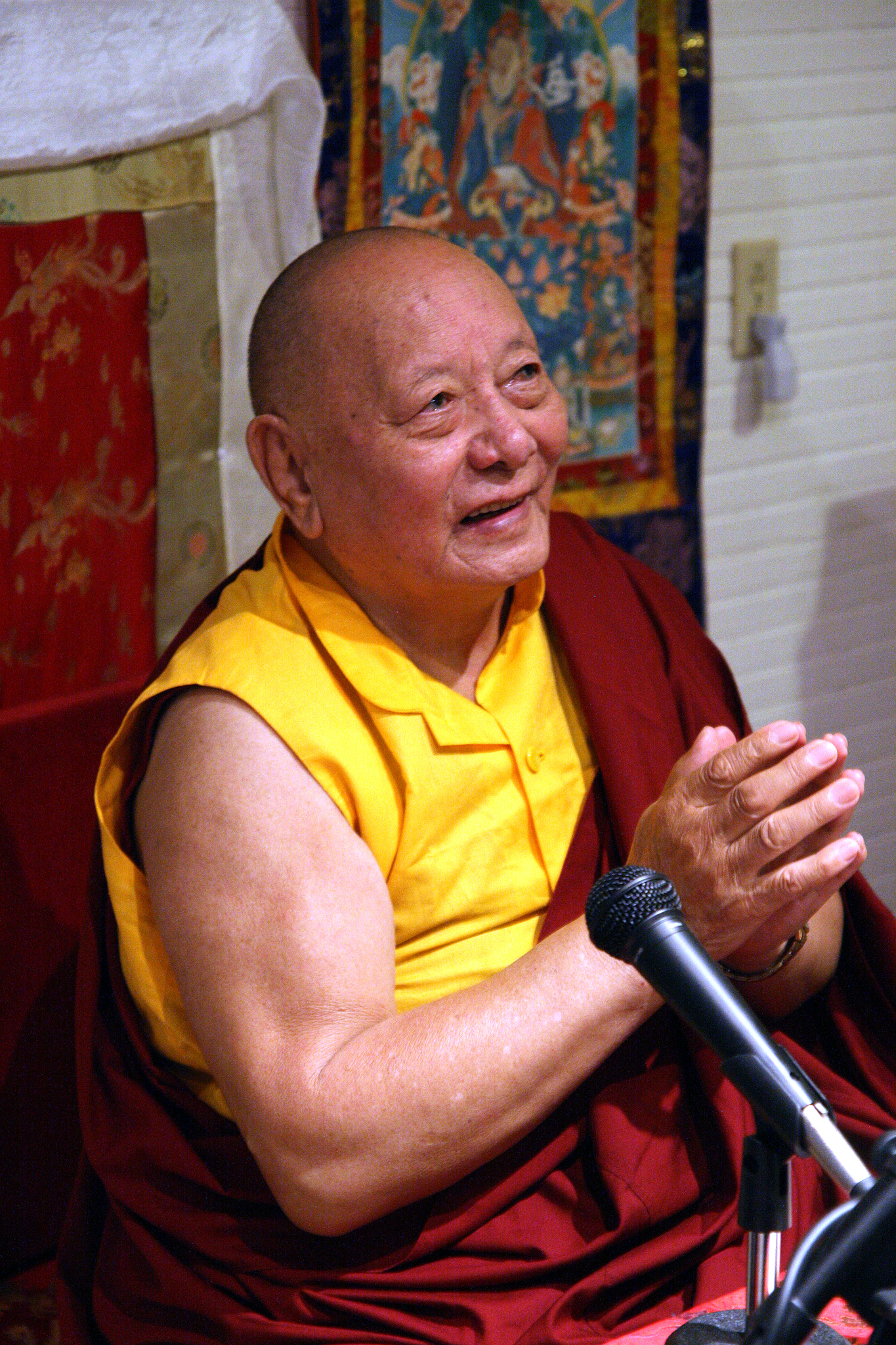
- Title: Venerable (ecclesiastic) or Khenpo (academic) or Rinpoche (devotional) (or any combination)

Personal life
- Born: 3 April 1924; Kham, Tibet
- Died: 6 October 2019 (aged 95)
- Other name: The Venerable Khenpo Karma Tharchin Rinpoche

Religious life
- Religion: Tibetan Buddhism
- School: Karma Kagyu

Senior posting
- Based in: Woodstock, NY, USA

Khenpo Karma Tharchin Rinpoche (3 April 1924 – 6 October 2019), widely known by his abbreviated name Khenpo Karthar Rinpoche, was a senior lama of the Karma Kagyu school of Tibetan Buddhism. Before his death he served as abbot of Karma Triyana Dharmachakra (KTD) Monastery in Woodstock, New York.

Khenpo Karthar Rinpoche practiced and taught Mahamudra and Dzogchen and served as Retreat Master for several three-year retreats. He taught Buddhist history and philosophy at every level, wrote several books on philosophy and the practice of meditation, and conferred initiation at every level of Vajrayana practice, including Anuttarayogatantra. He hosted visits and teachings by the lamas of the Karma Kagyu and other lineages, including a visit to KTD by the 14th Dalai Lama in September 2006, and in late May 2008 presided over the enthronement of the 17th Gyalwa Karmapa Ogyen Trinley Dorje in his principal seat in the West at KTD.

== Biography ==
Born in Kham, Tibet to a nomadic family, Khenpo Rinpoche was not (in contrast to most Rinpoches) a tulku or reincarnate lama, but achieved his realization in his lifetime. He began his religious training under his parents, who were both devout practitioners, and at the age of 12 entered Thrangu Monastery to continue his education. At age 20, he received the Gelong ordination from the 11th Tai Situ Rinpoche at Palpung Monastery. Following a series of retreats including the traditional 3-year retreat, he was sent by his guru the 8th Traleg Rinpoche to Thrangu Monastery for advanced education in Buddhist studies. After five years of study, at age 30, he was awarded the Khenpo degree and began teaching.

In 1958, in the company of the 9th Thrangu Rinpoche, the 9th Traleg Rinpoche and others, he fled the Chinese Communist destruction of Thrangu Monastery by undertaking an arduous several-month-long trek to Tsurphu Monastery. After a month's rest, the 16th Gyalwa Karmapa sent them on to take refuge in Bhutan, where Khenpo Rinpoche remained for eight years. In 1967 Rinpoche was called to Rumtek Monastery in Sikkim, India to teach the monks and engage in pastoral ministry for the local community. For the next several years he was sent from place to place to teach and minister, and in 1975 the 16th Karmapa bestowed upon him the title of "Chöje Lama" (Superior Dharma Master).

In 1976 the Gyalwa Karmapa sent Khenpo Rinpoche to establish a seat for the Karmapas in North America and to serve as abbot for a new monastery there. Rinpoche traveled to New York City and then on to Woodstock, NY, where he founded Karma Triyana Dharmachakra (KTD) Monastery and a series of local teaching centers across the United States. He was joined by the 3rd Bardor Tulku Rinpoche and, together with lay representative Tenzin Chonyi and local practitioners, they progressed from teaching in an old hotel to building both a traditional Tibetan monastery complex and a nearby retreat center with (separate) facilities for both men and women.

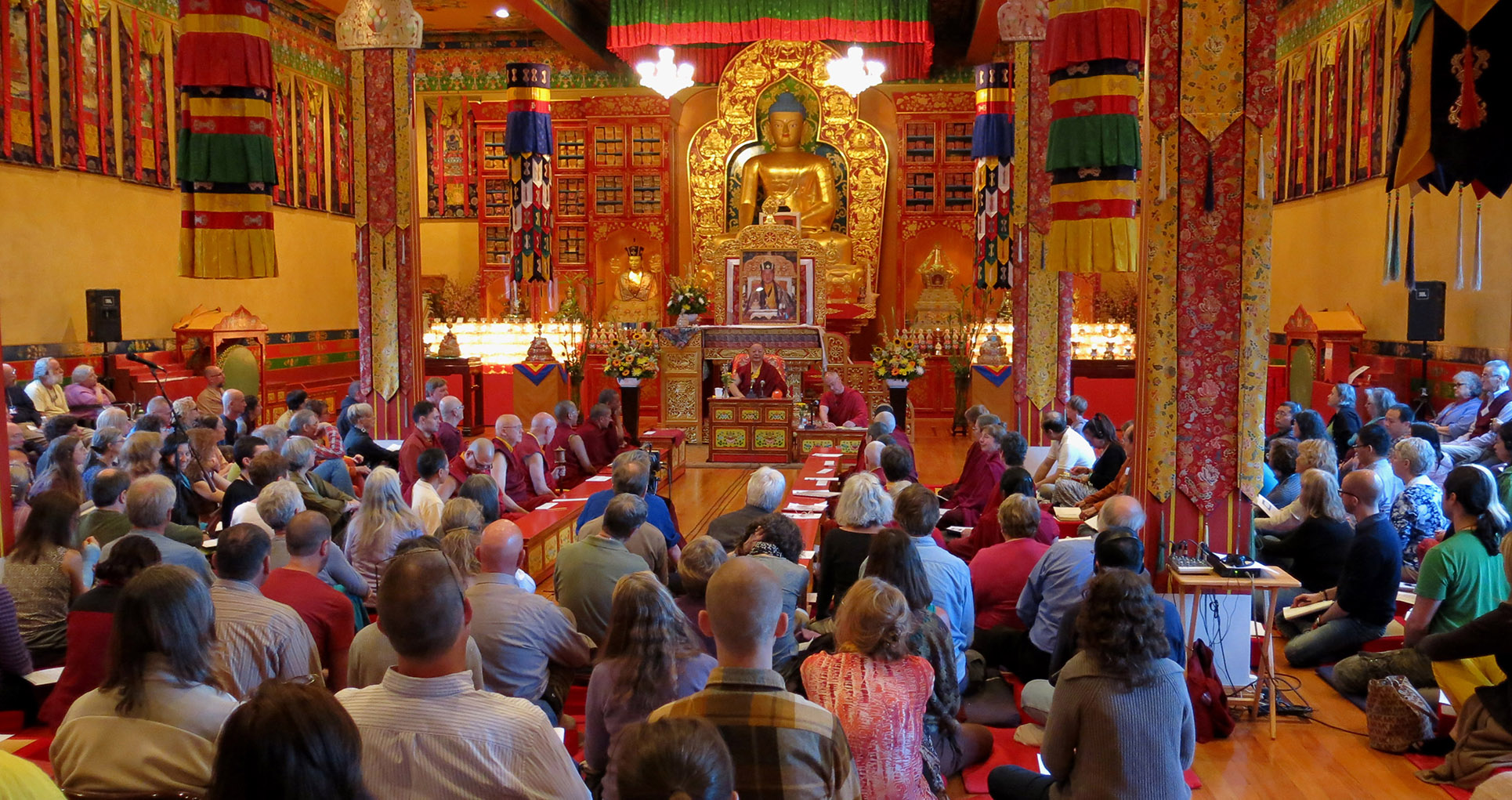
Khenpo Karthar Rinpoche teaching at Karma Triyana Dharmachakra in May, 2013.

In August 1990, Rinpoche assisted the 3rd Jamgon Kongtrul Rinpoche in transmitting the Kalachakra initiation in Toronto, Ontario, Canada. Through the late 90s, he organized and led several pilgrimages to Tsurphu Monastery in Tibet to meet the 17th Gyalwa Karmapa and hosted the 12th Tai Situ Rinpoche (the 17th Karmapa's guru) at KTD for a series of residential teachings. After leaving Tibet in January, 2000, Khenpo led several pilgrimages to visit him in India.

In September, 2006, the 14th Dalai Lama accepted Khenpo Rinpoche's invitation to visit and teach at Karma Triyana Dharmachakra, and in May 2008 and July 2011, Khenpo Rinpoche hosted the 17th Karmapa Orgyen Trinley Dorje in residence at KTD. In July 2010, he organized and presided over the first Kagyu Monlam (assembly) to be held in the Americas.

In addition to establishing 28 teaching centers in the USA, three in Canada and four in South America, Khenpo Rinpoche had many students in Taiwan and Central America and is known in Tibetan communities across Tibet, Bhutan, Nepal and India.

Khenpo Rinpoche lived until he was 95 years old (96 by Tibetan reckoning, which counts age from conception) and continued active teaching and his ministerial schedule to the end. For example, over May 17–19, 2013 he transmitted the Khenpo Gangshar mind teachings ("Naturally Liberating Whatever You Meet," which he had received directly from Khenpo Gangshar) and from July 13–21, 2013, he delivered the first-ever Spanish-language retreat and simultaneous webcast, attended in person by 60 Spanish-speaking pilgrims and across the internet by 1900 people from 39 countries.

From 22–31 August 2014, he conducted, in English, the transmission of the Pointing Out Instructions for Mahamudra from Torch of Certainty by the 1st Jamgon Kongtrul Rinpoche. In April 2015, he welcomed the 17th Karmapa back to KTD Monastery for an 11-day visit, his third visit to the United States and to KTD Monastery. Over 17–23 July 2016, Rinpoche led the first-ever Spanish-language Chöd retreat. From 2015 until his death, Khenpo delivered oral transmission and commentary on several seminal teachings by Karma Chagme.

Rinpoche died in his home at Karme Ling Retreat Center on 6 October 2019 at the age of 95. His body remained in state in his room for several days, then in the main shrine room of Karme Ling until 20 October, when he was given the full 4-way cremation ceremony of a high Lama of the Karma Kagyu.

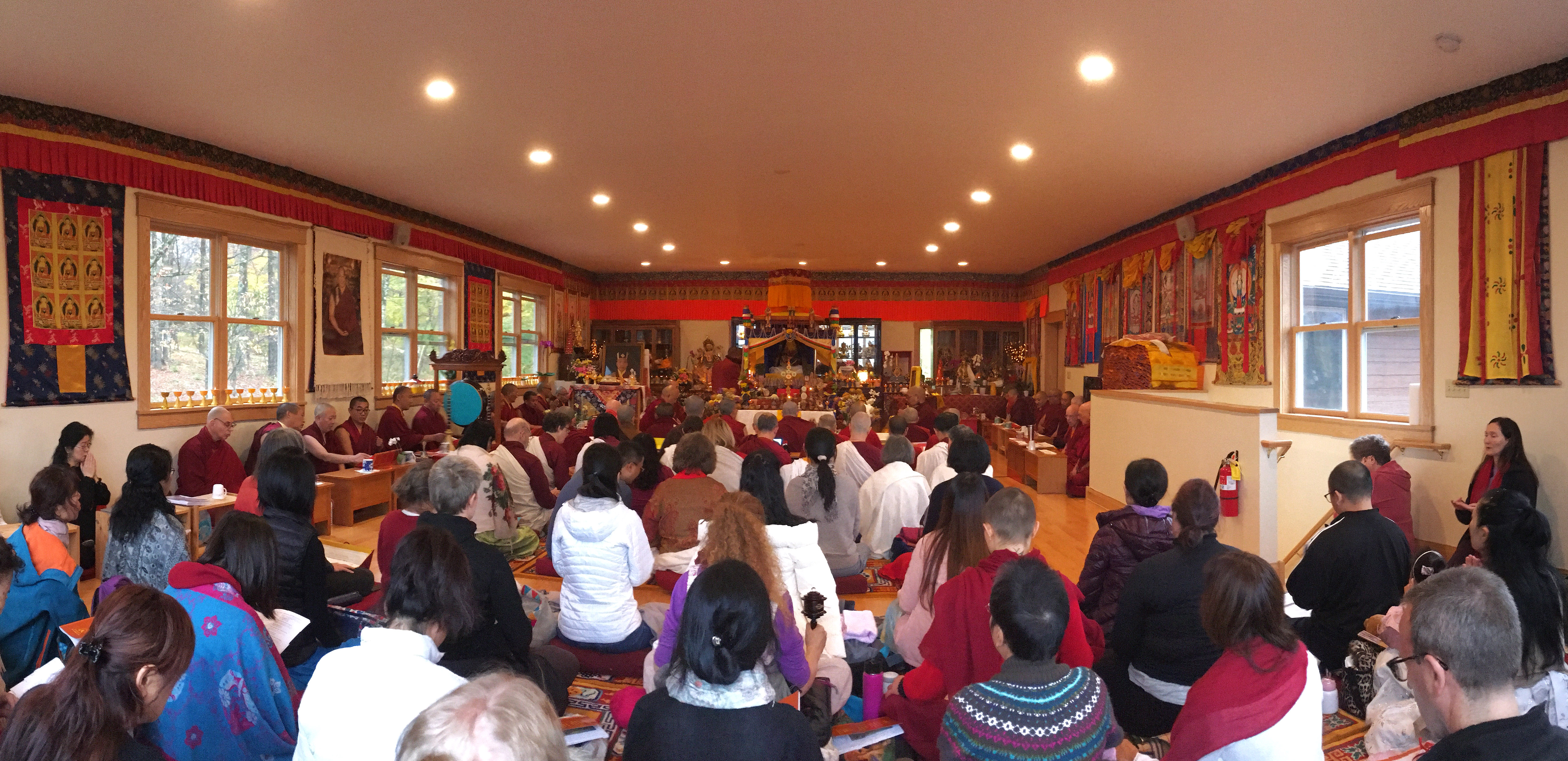
Khenpo Karthar resting in state in the main shrine room at Karme Ling

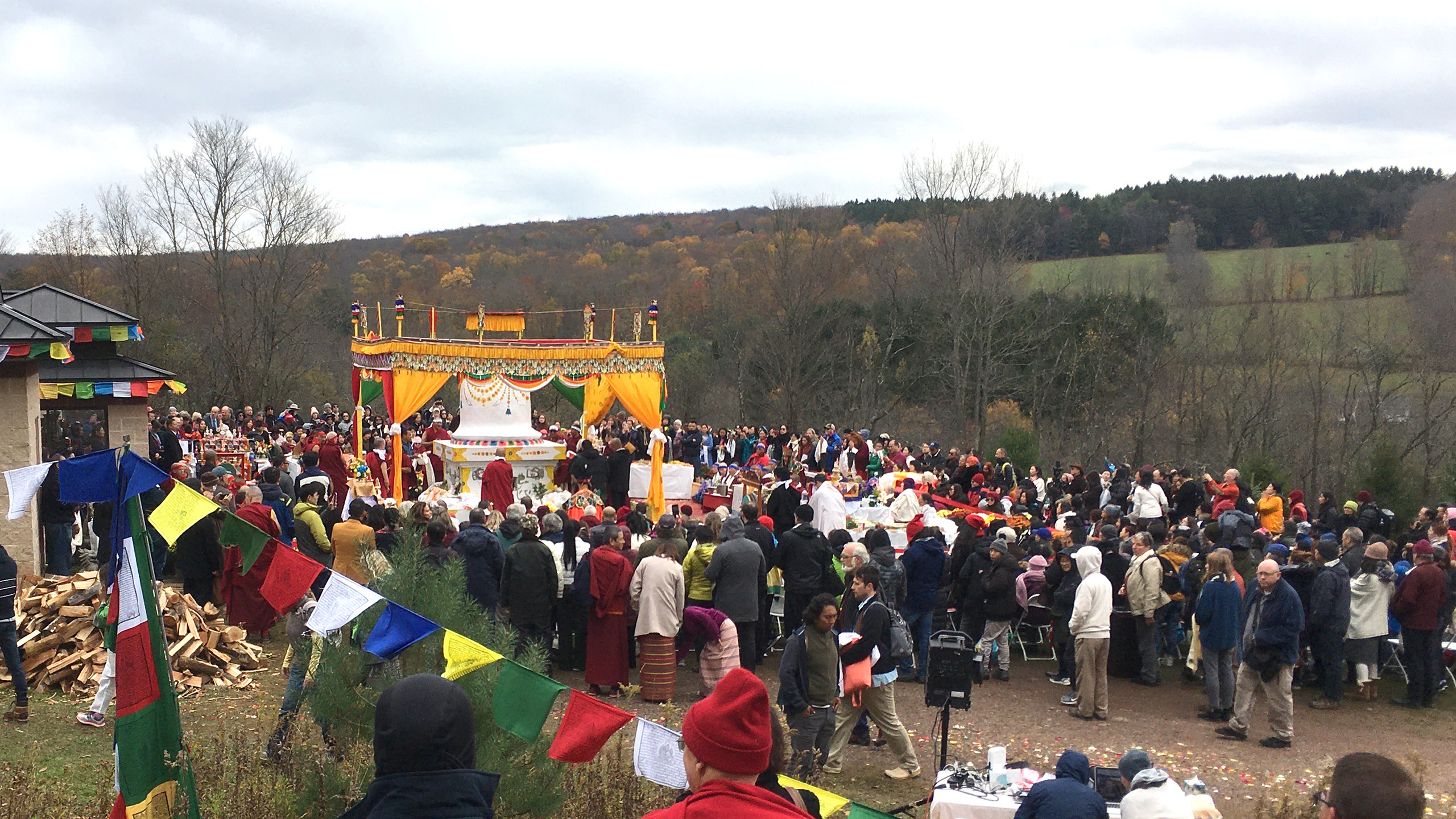
The cremation ceremony of Khenpo Karthar Rinpoche

== Partial bibliography ==
- Karthar Rinpoche, Khenpo (1992). Roth, Laura (ed.). Dharma Paths. Snow Lion Publications. ISBN 1-55939-002-6.
- Karthar Rinpoche, Khenpo (1996). The Instructions of Gampopa, A Precious Garland of the Supreme Path. Snow Lion Publications. ISBN 1-55939-046-8.
- Karthar Rinpoche, Khenpo (2002). Taking Refuge. Rinchen Publications. ISBN 0-9714554-1-4.
- Chagme, Karma; Karthar Rinpoche, Khenpo (2004). Karma Chakme's Mountain Dharma. Vol. 1. Translated by Yeshe Gyamtso. KTD Publications. ISBN 0-9741092-0-7.
- Chagme, Karma; Karthar Rinpoche, Khenpo (2006). Karma Chakme's Mountain Dharma. Vol. 2. Translated by Yeshe Gyamtso. KTD Publications. ISBN 0-9741092-1-5.
- Wangchuk, Chokyi; Karthar Rinpoche, Khenpo (2007). Bardo: Interval of Possibility, Khenpo Karthar Rinpoche's Teaching on Aspiration for Liberation in the Bardo. Translated by Yeshe Gyamtso. KTD Publications. ISBN 0-9741092-2-3.
- Chagme, Karma; Karthar Rinpoche, Khenpo (2008). Karma Chakme's Mountain Dharma. Vol. 3. Translated by Yeshe Gyamtso. KTD Publications. ISBN 978-1-934608-01-2.
- Chagme, Karma; Karthar Rinpoche, Khenpo (2008). The Quintessence of the Union of Mahamudra and Dzokchen. Translated by Yeshe Gyamtso. KTD Publications. ISBN 978-1-934608-02-9.
- Karthar Rinpoche, Khenpo (2009). The Wish-Fulfilling Wheel: The Practice of White Tara. Rinchen Publications. ISBN 0-9714554-2-2.
- Chagme, Karma; Karthar Rinpoche, Khenpo (2010). Karma Chakme's Mountain Dharma. Vol. 4. Translated by Yeshe Gyamtso. KTD Publications. ISBN 978-1-934608-07-4.
- Karthar Rinpoche, Khenpo (2013). Siddhas of Ga: Remembered by Khenpo Karthar Rinpoche. Translated by Yeshe Gyamtso. KTD Publications. ISBN 978-1-934608-37-1.
- Karthar Rinpoche, Khenpo (2015). Excellent at the Beginning: Discovering the Buddhist Way. Rinchen Publications. ISBN 978-0971455443.
