= Karma Gon Monastery =

Tibetan Buddhist monastery in Karuo District, Tibet, China

Karma Gon Monastery Karma Dansa Gama Si
- Tibetan transcription(s); Tibetan: ཀརྨ་དགོན་པ; Wylie transliteration: karma dgon pa THL: karma gönpa Chinese transcription(s); Traditional: 噶瑪寺; Simplified: 噶玛寺; Pinyin: gámǎ sì
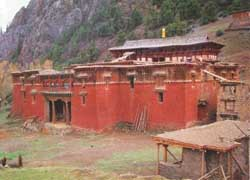
- Principal Hall of Karma Gon

- Location within Tibet Autonomous Region

Religion
- Affiliation: Tibetan Buddhism
- Sect: Vajrayana or Mahayana

Location
- Location: Karub District
- Country: China
- Coordinates: 31°49′50″N 96°54′51″E

Architecture
- Style: Tibetan, Naxi (Jang) and Chinese
- Founder: Düsum Khyenpa
- Established: 1147; 879 years ago

Karma Gon Monastery, (Tibetan: ཀརྨ་དགོན་པ, Wylie: karma dgon pa, THL: karma gönpa; Chinese: 噶玛寺; pinyin: gámǎ sì) the original monastery of the Karma Kagyu sect of Tibetan Buddhism, was founded in the 12th century by Düsum Khyenpa, the 1st Karmapa Lama in eastern Tibet at the age of 76. Karma Gon (karma dgon, also Karma Dansa, karma gdan sa; Chinese, Gama Si), is located on the eastern bank of the Dzachu River in Chamdo, eastern Tibet. Karma Dansa was the cradle of the karma kagyupas. When established the Karmapa had gathered 1000 monks around him here. Karma Gon was named as Karma Dansa as an administrative unit and the Chinese Ming Court enlarged the monastery’s jurisdiction by adding the Mekong’s middle and upper reaches. It was then also called Gama Dansa Si in Chinese.

Other sources, claim it was founded in 1184 by Chödzin Gemphel(chos ‘dzin dge ‘phel), the late 1st Karmapa Düsum Khyenpa (dus gsum mkhyen pa).

== History ==
History records that Deshin Shekpa, 5th Karmapa Lama gave the title of Situ to his disciple, Chokyi Gyaltsen (1377–1448), and appointed him as the Master of Studies at Karma Gon. Earlier than this incarnation, there were two others namely, Yehse Nyingpo and Ringowa Ratnabhadra. After Situ Chokyi Gyaltsen, the second Situ in the list was Tashi Namgyal (1450–97) who was ordained Thongwa Dönden, 6th Karmapa Lama and put in charge of the Karma Gon.

The third Situ was Tashi Paljor (1498–1541) followed by the Situ Chokyi Gocha (1542–85); both were involved in developing the Karma Gon Monastery. They are credited with creating a fine library, apart from embellishing the monastery walls with rare paintings and carvings. Most of these were reportedly destroyed during the Cultural Revolution by the communist regime, except for a few old buildings that still remain. The fourth Situpa was Situ Tashi Paljor who identified Miko Dorjee as the 8th Karmapa and who also became his teacher. The Fifth Situpa Chokyi Gyaltsen was honoured with a red Crown by Wangchuk Dorje, 9th Karmapa Lama for his spiritual attainments. The Tai Situpas with their roots in the Kham region of eastern Tibet always played a significant role in identifying the Karmapa Incarnations. The sixth Tai Situpa was Mipal Chogyal Rabten (1658–82) known for his miracle performing achievements, who was followed by Mawe Nyima (son of King Lin) who had a premature death. The eighth Tai Situpa, Chokyi Jungne (1700–74) was the most distinguished scholar who went to establish Palpung Monastery in 1717 after which the importance of the Karma Gon monastery has waned.

== Structure ==
The hundred-pillar Assembly Hall was once one of the largest in Tibet, containing 12 chapels and magnificent murals illustrating the deeds of the Buddha and historical scenes relating to the Karma Kagyu school of Tibetan Buddhism. It used to contain three gilded brass images of the 'Buddhas of the Three Times' in its inner sanctum and there was a large central image of Shakyamuni Buddha on a sandalwood throne which 8th Karmapa personally designed. The surviving buildings show a remarkable synthesis of Tibetan, Naxi (Jang) and Chinese styles which attest to the influence of the monastery as far south as Lithang. There a number of statues and other relics, some of them ancient, and an upstairs room sealed off with a curtain of chain mail where 100 monks study the commentaries of the 8th Karmapa.

"Adjacent to the great temple, in the Khandro Bumtang meadow, where Karmapas would perform the Black Hat ceremony, there are three ancient stupas, containing the relics of the First Karmapa, the First Situ Rinpoche and Wangchuk Chobar, who was a senior student of the former. Behind these is a chapel containing the gilded stupa of Karma Pakshi (1204–1339), replete with sacred tooth relics, and a newly build [sic] monastic college which will hold 500 monks ... ruined hermitages are in the crags above the temple, alongside that of the first Karmapa, which is nowadays marked with prayer flags. There are, however, two active retreat centres above the monastery, dedicated respectively to the practices of Chodruk and Dorje Drolo."

In the 13th century, Karma Pakshi, 2nd Karmapa Lama, considered a child prodigy, had become an ordained monk at the age of 22. He had received the complete series of Kargyu teachings and was the dharma protector of Kargyu lineage. He was the 2nd Gyalwa Karmapa. During his visit to this monastery, after noting the poor state of repair of the monastery, he had ensured during his time, complete restoration of the monastery to its original state.

== Restoration ==
"Chokgyur Lingpa has lived in the Sang Ngak Podrang (Secret Mantra Palace) hermitage of Karma Gon Monastery (the first monastery of the first Karmapa) for several years with his main disciple, Karma Rinchen Dhagye. This hermitage is greatly in need of maintenance. When [Chokling Jigmed Palden] Rinpoche visited Karma Gon in 2005, he accepted the monastery’s request to help rebuild the Chokgyur Lingpa’s hermitage."

The Government of People's Republic of China and the Tibet Autonomous Region have undertaken an extensive programme and provided funds for the maintenance and restoration of a number of famous monasteries including the Karma-gdan-sa monastery of the Karma Kargyu sect.
