= Thrangu Rinpoche =

Tibetan tulku (1933–2023)

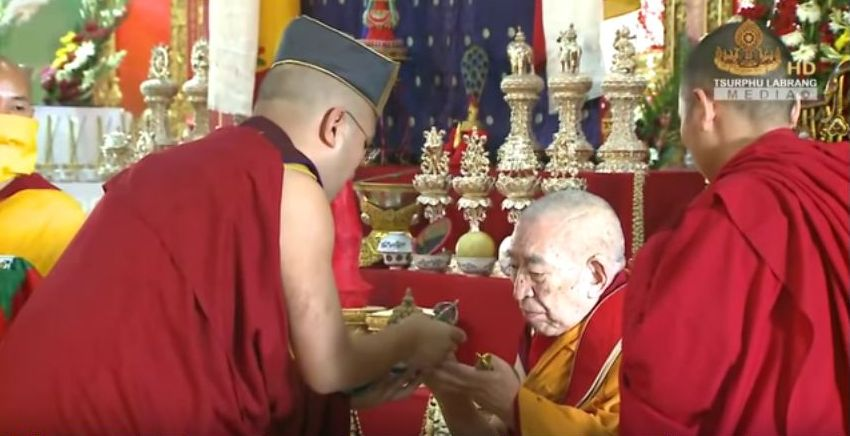
17th Karmapa performs Long Life Offering to Khenchen Thrangu Rinpoche

Thrangu Rinpoche (Tibetan: ཁྲ་འགུ་, Wylie: Khra-'gu) (1933 – 4 June 2023) was a tulku (reincarnated lama) in the Kagyu school of Tibetan Buddhism, the ninth reincarnation in his particular line. His full name and title was the Very Venerable Ninth Khenchen Thrangu Tulku, Karma Lodrö Lungrik Maway Senge. The academic title Khenchen denotes great scholarly accomplishment (English-language analogues include the titles Distinguished Professor and Academic Fellow), and the term Rinpoche ("Precious" or "Precious One") is a Tibetan devotional title which may be accorded to respected teachers and exemplars.

== Biography ==
=== Early life and exile ===
Thrangu Rinpoche was born in Kham, Tibet. He was installed at Thrangu Monastery in Kham (eastern Tibet) after his identification by the Sixteenth Karmapa and the previous Tai Situpa at age five. He was one of the principal lamas there, although Traleg Rinpoche is the supreme abbot of the complex. He fled to India following the Chinese invasion in 1959.

At the age of thirty-five Thrangu Rinpoche took the geshe examination in Bengal and was awarded the degree of Geshe Lharampa, the highest degree conferred in the Gelug transmission (it is not uncommon for monks of other lineage to pursue studies in that tradition). He was subsequently awarded the Khenchen degree of the Kagyu tradition. He played a critical role in the recovery of important Buddhist texts that had been largely destroyed by the Chinese Communists. He was named Abbot of Rumtek monastery, the home monastery in exile of the Karmapa, and also of the Nalanda Institute for Higher Buddhist Studies at Rumtek.

=== Establishment of Buddhist institutions ===
As Abbot of the Nalanda Institute, Thrangu Rinpoche and Khenpo Tsultrim Gyamtso Rinpoche trained all the younger tulkus of the lineage, including the Dzogchen Ponlop Rinpoche, who was in the first class. He was also the personal tutor of the four principal Karma Kagyu tulkus: Shamar Rinpoche, Tai Situ Rinpoche, Jamgon Kongtrul Rinpoche, and Gyaltsab Rinpoche. Thrangu Rinpoche established the fundamental curriculum of the Karma Kagyu lineage taught at Rumtek. In addition, he taught with Khenpo Karthar Rinpoche, who had been a teacher at Thrangu Rinpoche's monastery in Tibet before 1959, and who was until his death the founding abbot of Karma Triyana Dharmachakra in Woodstock, New York, the seat of Karmapa in North America.

In 1976, after 15 years at Rumtek, Thrangu Rinpoche founded the Thrangu Tashi Choling monastery in Boudhanath, Kathmandu, Nepal, and later also founded a retreat centre and college at Namo Buddha; Tara Abbey, which offers a full dharma education for Tibetan nuns leading to a khenpo degree; a school in Boudhanath for the general education of Tibetan children and young monks in Western subjects and Buddhist studies; and a free medical clinic in an impoverished area of Nepal. Thrangu Rinpoche recently completed a large monastery in Sarnath, India, overlooking the deer park where the Buddha gave his first teaching on the Four Noble Truths. The monastery is named Vajra Vidya in honor of the Sixteenth Karmapa. It is now the seat of the major annual Kagyu conference.

=== Worldwide activities ===
In 1976, Thrangu Rinpoche began teaching Buddhism throughout Asia and in the West. He founded Thrangu House in Oxford, England, in 1981, then in the United States and Canada, he established centres in Crestone, Colorado, Maine, California, Vancouver and Edmonton. He established another fourteen centres in nine other countries. He was the Abbot of Gampo Abbey, a Karma Kagyu monastery in Cape Breton, Nova Scotia, founded by his dharma brother Chogyam Trungpa Rinpoche, reflective of his close ties with the Shambhala Buddhist community.

Rinpoche resided in Nepal where he served as senior tutor to Urgyen Trinley Dorje.

On 25 July 2010, Thrangu Monastery was opened by Thrangu Rinpoche in Richmond, British Columbia, Canada. It is the first traditional Buddhist monastery in Canada. It contains a six-metre-tall (20 ft) gold-plated statue of Shakyamuni Buddha, and the shrine hall can seat 500 people.

Rinpoche died on 4 June 2023 at Thrangu Monastery.

== Bibliography ==
- Aspirational Prayer for Mahamudra of Rangjung Dorje (1999), Namo Buddha Publications.
- Buddha Nature (1988, 1993), Rangjung Yeshe Publications. ISBN 962-7341-17-7
- Buddhist Conduct: The Ten Virtuous Actions (2001), Namo Buddha Publications.
- Creation and Completion (1996, 2002), Wisdom Publications. ISBN 978-0-86171-312-7
- Crystal Clear: Practical Advice for Mahamudra Meditators (2003), Rangjung Yeshe Publications. ISBN 978-962-7341-51-2
- Distinguishing Dharma and Dharmata: A Commentary on the Treatise of Maitreya (2004), Zhyisil Chokyi Ghatsal Publications. ISBN 978-1-877294-33-4
- Essential Practice: Lectures on Kamalashila's Stages of Meditation (2002), Snow Lion. ISBN 978-1-55939-181-8
- Essentials of Mahamudra: Looking Directly at the Mind (2004), Wisdom Publications. ISBN 978-0-86171-371-4
- Everyday Consciousness and Primordial Awareness (2002), Snow Lion. ISBN 978-1-55939-379-9
- The Five Buddha Families and the Eight Consciousnesses (2013), Namo Buddha Publications. ISBN 978-1-931571-51-7
- The Four Dharmas of Gampopa (2013), Namo Buddha Publications. ISBN 978-1-931571-50-0
- Four Foundations of Buddhist Practice (2010), Namo Buddha Publications. ISBN 978-1-931571-19-7
- A Guide to the Bardo (2004), Namo Buddha Publications. ISBN 978-1-931571-08-1
- A Guide to the Bodhisattva's Way of Life of Shantideva (2002).
- A Guide to Mahamudra Meditation (2008), Namo Buddha Publications. ISBN 978-1-931571-15-9
- A Guide to Shamatha Meditation (2001), Namo Buddha Publications. ISBN 0-9628026-4-6
- The Heart of the Dharma: Mind Training for Beginners (2010), KTD Publications. ISBN 978-1-934608-15-9
- A History of Buddhism in India (2008), Zhyisil Chokyi Ghatsal Publications. ISBN 978-1-877294-39-6
- The Jewel Ornament of Liberation (2003), Zhyisil Chokyi Ghatsal Publications. ISBN 978-1-877294-27-3
- Journey of the Mind: Putting the Teachings on the Bardo into Effective Practice (1997), Karma Thekchen Choling, Vancouver.
- King of Samadhi: Commentaries on the Samadhi Raja Sutra (2004), Rangjung Yeshe Publications. ISBN 962-7341-19-3
- The Life and Spiritual Songs of Milarepa (2003), Zhyisil Chokyi Ghatsal Publications. ISBN 978-1-877294-26-6
- The Life and Teachings of Gampopa (2003), Zhyisil Chokyi Ghatsal Publications. ISBN 978-1-877294-30-3
- The Life of the Buddha and the Four Noble Truths (2009), Namo Buddha Publications. ISBN 978-1-931571-09-8
- The Life of Tilopa and the Ganges Mahamudra (2002), Zhyisil Chokyi Ghatsal Publications. ISBN 978-1-877294-22-8
- Medicine Buddha Teachings (2004), Snow Lion. ISBN 978-1-55939-216-7
- The Middle-Way Meditation Instructions of Mipham Rinpoche (2000), Namo Buddha Publications. ISBN 978-0-9628026-6-9
- The Ninth Karmapa's Ocean of Definitive Meaning (2010), Snow Lion. ISBN 978-1-55939-370-6
- An Ocean of the Ultimate Meaning: Teachings on Mahamudra (2004), Snow Lion. ISBN 978-1-59030-055-8
- On Buddha Essence: A Commentary on Rangjung Dorje's Treatise (2006), Shambhala. ISBN 978-1-59030-276-7
- The Open Door to Emptiness (2012), Namo Buddha Publications, ISBN 978-1-931571-21-0
- The Ornament of Clear Realization (2005), Zhyisil Chokyi Ghatsal Publications. ISBN 978-1-877294-34-1
- Pointing Out the Dharmakaya (2003), Snow Lion. ISBN 978-1-55939-388-1
- The Practice of Tranquillity and Insight (1993), Snow Lion. ISBN 978-1-55939-106-1
- Rechungpa: A Biography of Milarepa's Disciple (2011), Namo Buddha Publications. ISBN 978-1-931571-22-7
- Seven Points of Mind Training (2006), Zhyisil Chokyi Ghatsal Publications.
- Shentong and Rangtong: Two Views of Emptiness (2009), Namo Buddha Publications. ISBN 978-1-931571-17-3
- Showing the Path to Liberation (2002), Namo Buddha Publications. ISBN 978-1-931571-00-5
- A Song for the King: Saraha on Mahamudra Meditation (2006), Wisdom Publications. ISBN 978-0-86171-503-9
- Songs of Naropa: Commentaries on Songs of Realization (1997), Rangjung Yeshe Publications.
- A Spiritual Biography of Marpa the Translator (2001), Zhyisil Chokyi Ghatsal Publications. ISBN 978-1-877294-07-5
- The Spiritual Song of Lodro Thaye (2008), Zhyisil Chokyi Ghatsal Publications. ISBN 978-1-877294-40-2
- Teachings on the Practice of Meditation (2001), Zhyisil Chokyi Ghatsal Publications. ISBN 978-1-877294-04-4
- The Three Vehicles of Buddhist Practice (2003), Namo Buddha Publications. ISBN 978-1-931571-02-9
- Transcending Ego: Distinguishing Consciousness from Wisdom (2001), Namo Buddha Publications. ISBN 978-0-9628026-1-4
- The Twelve Links of Interdependent Origination (2013), Namo Buddha Publications. ISBN 978-1-931571-52-4
- The Uttaratantra: A Treatise on Buddha-Essence (2004), Zhyisil Chokyi Ghatsal Publications. ISBN 978-1-877294-29-7
- Vivid Awareness: The Mind Instructions of Khenpo Gangshar (2011), Shambhala. ISBN 978-1-59030-816-5
