= Chöje Lama Gelongma Palmo =

Austrian Buddhist nun and Karma Kagyu lama (born 1970)

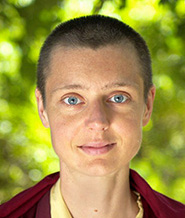
- Chöje Lama Palmo (2004)
- Title: Chöje Lama; Gelongma (bhikkhunī)

Personal life
- Born: Sabine Januschke; 1970 (age 55–56) Vienna, Austria
- Notable work(s): Shangrila meines Herzens (2012); The Himalayas and Beyond (2009)
- Known for: Founder of Palpung Europe; Western female lama
- Occupation: Buddhist nun, teacher, author

Religious life
- Religion: Buddhism
- School: Karma Kagyu
- Lineage: Palpung tradition
- Ordination: 1998 (novice); 2004 (full ordination)

Senior posting
- Teacher: Tai Situ Rinpoche
- Based in: Austria
- Organization: Palpung Yeshe Chökhor Ling Europe

Chöje Lama Gelongma Palmo (Wylie: chos rje bla ma dge slong ma dpal mo; born 1970 as Sabine Januschke in Vienna) is an Austrian Buddhist nun and teacher in the Karma Kagyu school of Tibetan Buddhism. She is among the few female lamas in this tradition and is regarded as one of the first non-Asian women to be appointed a Chöje Lama, a senior teaching title within the lineage.

She is known for presenting Buddhist teachings in an accessible and contemporary manner, particularly for Western audiences. Her work includes teaching meditation and Buddhist philosophy, as well as engaging in social and humanitarian activities.

In 2004, she was sent to Austria by Tai Situ Rinpoche to establish a European centre of the Palpung lineage. She subsequently founded Palpung Europe, with centres in Purkersdorf and Langschlag, and serves as its head lama.

== Life ==
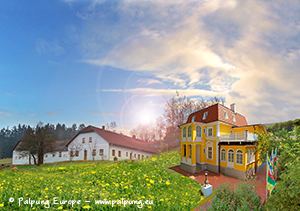
Retreat and City Institute of The European Seat of H. H. Chamgon Kenting Tai Situpa

Born 1970 in Vienna, Lama Palmo graduated with Vienna Business School, studied German Philology and Romance languages at University of Vienna and received a Master of the Arts degree in German Medievalism. As a media expert she worked as journalist, in the public relation fields and as photographer until her monastic ordination.

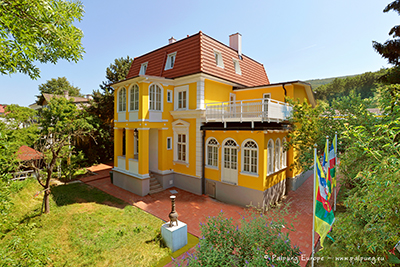
City Institute of the European Seat of H. H. Chamgon Kenting Tai Situpa

Since her first contact with Buddhism in her early twenties, she studied under the Palpung Sherab Ling Monastic Seat in India and received her entire training in her monastery. In 1998, she received her first monastic vows and entered the traditional Kagyu: three-years-retreat in KTD and USA, then being sent to Japan after its completion in 2004. In the same year, she was sent back to Austria. In December 2004, she received a Gelongma (tib.: dge slong ma, དགེ་སློང་མ།) full monastic Bhikkhuni ordination from a Mahayana lineage.

In 2006 she met the Dalai Lama and Gyalwa Karmapa Orgyen Trinley Dorje in private audiences. Both gave their advice and blessing for Lama Palmo's projects. In 2007, she was appointed director and resident teacher of Palpung Yeshe Chökhor Ling Europe by Tai Situ Rinpoche.

September 22, 2013 she was appointed Chöje Lama by Tai Situ Rinpoche. November 5, 2014, she received the Traditional Tibetan Appointment Document from H. H. 12th Chamgon Kenting Tai Situpa.

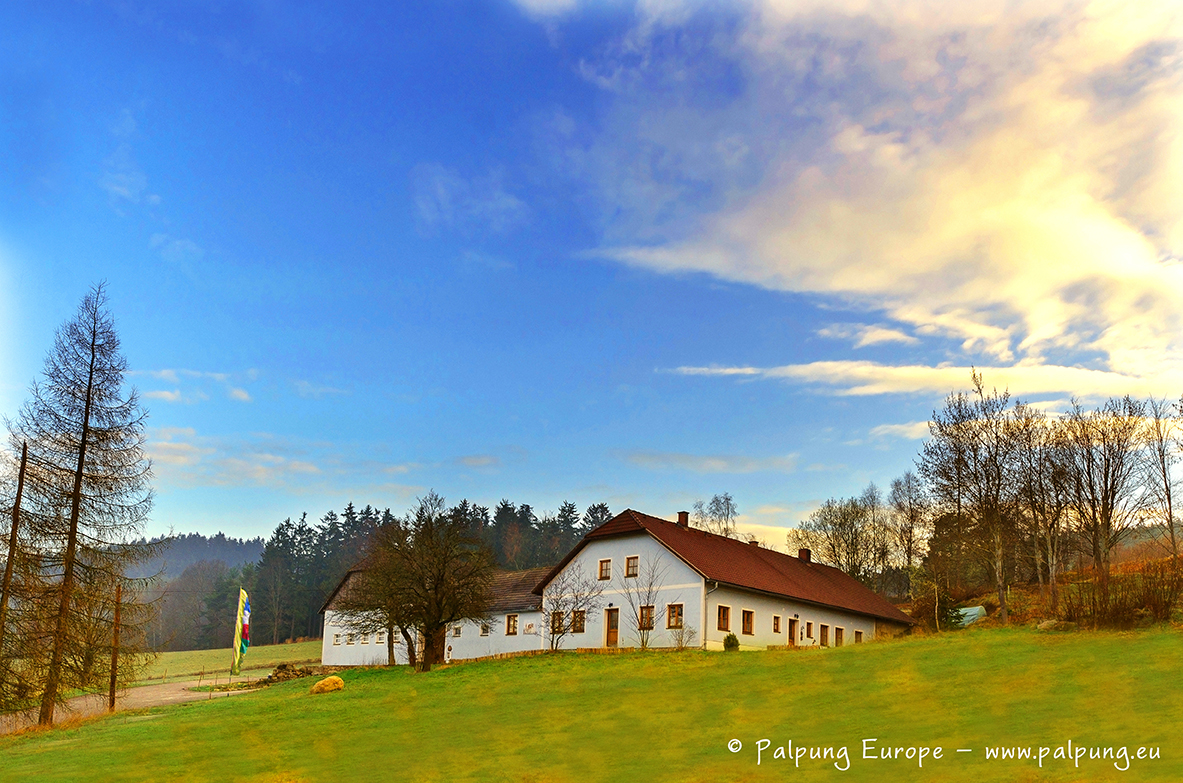
Retreat Institute of The European Seat of H. H. Chamgon Kenting Tai Situpa

== Activities ==
She established, guides and directs Palpung Europe, the European Seat of the Palpung lineage of Tibetan Buddhism with institutes in Purkersdorf near Vienna and Langschlag in the Waldviertel.

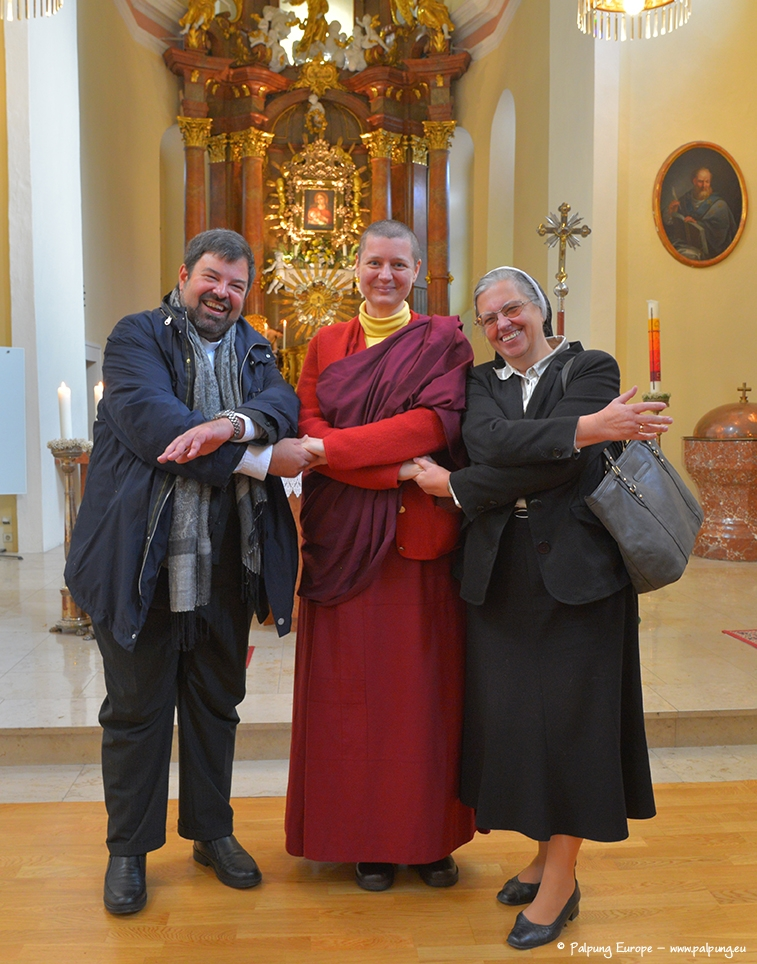
Chöje Lama Palmo Interreligion

Palpung Europe are Buddhist institutes and practice communities of the Palpung lineage of Vajrayana. Chöje Lama Palmo is actively involved into interreligious dialogue and is both guest and host of interreligious events of different formats with representatives of various religions. Chöje Lama Palmo is involved in the interreligious exchange for a better getting to know and acceptance of religions and their teachings for more harmony and peace in the world. In her social service, she is engaged within her Palpung Europe Welfare project, having created an animal sanctuary. She is further pastoring inmates and is punctually involved in other projects for the welfare of others. Further, she established Palpung Europe Publications in order to preserve and provide students with the Palpung lineage in transmissions, teachings and practice material in German language.

== Publications ==
- Gelongma Lama Palmo Shangrila meines Herzens - mein Weg zur buddhistischen Priesterin, Rütten & Loening, 2012, ISBN 3352008353, ISBN 978-3352008351
- Gelongma Lama Palmo The Himalayas and Beyond - Karma Kagyu Buddhism in India and Nepal, Foreword by the Dalai Lama, Palpung Yeshe Chökhor Ling Europe, 2009, ISBN 978-3-200-01476-3
- Online teachings
