= Chamdo (disambiguation) =

Chamdo is a prefecture-level city in Tibet Autonomous Region.

Chamdo (Tournadre western spelling), Changdu (Pinyin) or Qamdo (Tibetan pinyin, used on signs), can also refer to:

- Chamdo Town, known as Chengguan, the seat of the Chamdo prefecture-level city
- Chamdo Region, a former administrative region in western Kham, Tibet
- Chamdo County, or Karub District
- Qamdo Bangda Airport
