= Palpung Europe =

Buddhist institute in Purkersdorf, Austria

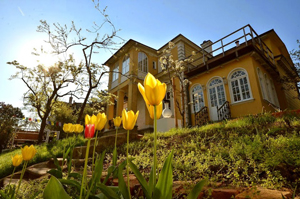
Palpung Europe City Institute, of The European Seat of the Palpung lineage

Palpung Europe (wylie: dpal spungs ye shes chos 'khor gling དཔལ་སྤུངས་ཡེ་ཤེས་ཆོས་འཁོར་གླིང་།), fully Palpung Yeshe Chökhor Ling Europe is the European Seat of the Palpung Congregation of H. H. Chamgon Kenting Tai Situ Rinpoche which was established by and is under the direction of Chöje Lama Palmo. The City Institute is based in the Viennese Forest in Purkersdorf, the Rural Institute lies in the Bohemian Forest in the border triangle of Austria, Germany and Czech Republique, in Langschlag.

Palpung Europe are Buddhist Institutes and practice groups of the Marpa Kagyu Tradition und Palpung lineage of Vajrayana. The Monastic Seat Palpung Sherab Ling in H. P., India is the Seat of the Palpung Congregation outside of Tibet. Its Supreme Head is Chamgon Kenting Tai Situ Rinpoche, currently in his 12th incarnation, is the Root guru of the 17th Gyalwa Karmapa, Orgyen Thrinle Dorje.

== Development ==
In 1997 Chamgon Kenting Tai Situ Rinpoche bestowed the original name. In 2004, after Chöje Lama Palmo had completed her three-year retreat under Khenpo Karthar Rinpoche in the US, she was upon the request of individuals sent to Austria by Chamgon Tai Situ Rinpoche. First the center had its house in a rented apartment, until a house in Purkersdorf was purchased in December 2009 and the farm in Langschlag in 2014.

The activities are dedicated to preserving the lineage Buddha Shakyamuni's and to bring peace and harmony into the world. H. H. Dalai Lama and H. H. Karmapa conferred their personal blessing on March 8, 2006. Interreligious exchanges according to the Rimé movement are an important objective.

== Publications ==
- 12th Chamgon Kenting Tai Situ Rinpoche: Tilopa- Einblicke in sein Leben Palpung Europe, 2017, ISBN 978-3-950-44293-9.
- 12th Chamgon Kenting Tai Situ Rinpoche: Gampopoas grundlegende Unterweisungen Palpung Europe, 2017, ISBN 978-3-950-44290-8.
- 12th Chamgon Kenting Tai Situ Rinpoche: Lobpreisungen und Huldigungen der 21 Taras Palpung Europe, 2017, ISBN 978-3-950-44292-2.
- 12th Chamgon Kenting Tai Situ Rinpoche: Den Pfad bereisen Palpung Europe, 2017, ISBN 978-3-950-44291-5.
- 12th Chamgon Kenting Tai Situ Rinpoche: Grundlage, Pfad und Ergebnis Palpung Europe, 2015, ISBN 978-3-200-03983-4.
- 12th Chamgon Kenting Tai Situ Rinpoche: Letztendlich vollkommen sein Palpung Europe, 2014, ISBN 978-3-200-03462-4.
- Gelongma Lama Palmo: The Himalayas and Beyond – Karma Kagyu Buddhism in India and Nepal Foreword by H. H. Dalai Lama, Palpung Yeshe Chökhor Ling Europe, 2009, ISBN 978-3-200-01476-3.
