= Dharmacakra (disambiguation) =

Dharmacakra may refer to:

- Dharmacakra, a common symbol used in Buddhism.
- Dharmacakra Pravartana Sutra, Sanskrit version of the Buddha's first discourse.
- Dharmacakra Mudra, a symbolic gesture representing the turning of the wheel of the Dharma
- Dhammacakkappavattana Sutta, the popular name of the Buddha's first discourse as recorded in the Pali canon.
- Karma Triyana Dharmachakra, a Tibetan Buddhist monastery in Woodstock, NY, USA
- Rumtek Monastery, in Sikkim, India, named the Dharmachakra Centre by the 16th Gyalwa Karmapa
