= Palpung Ireland Buddhist Centre =

Buddhist Centre in Ireland

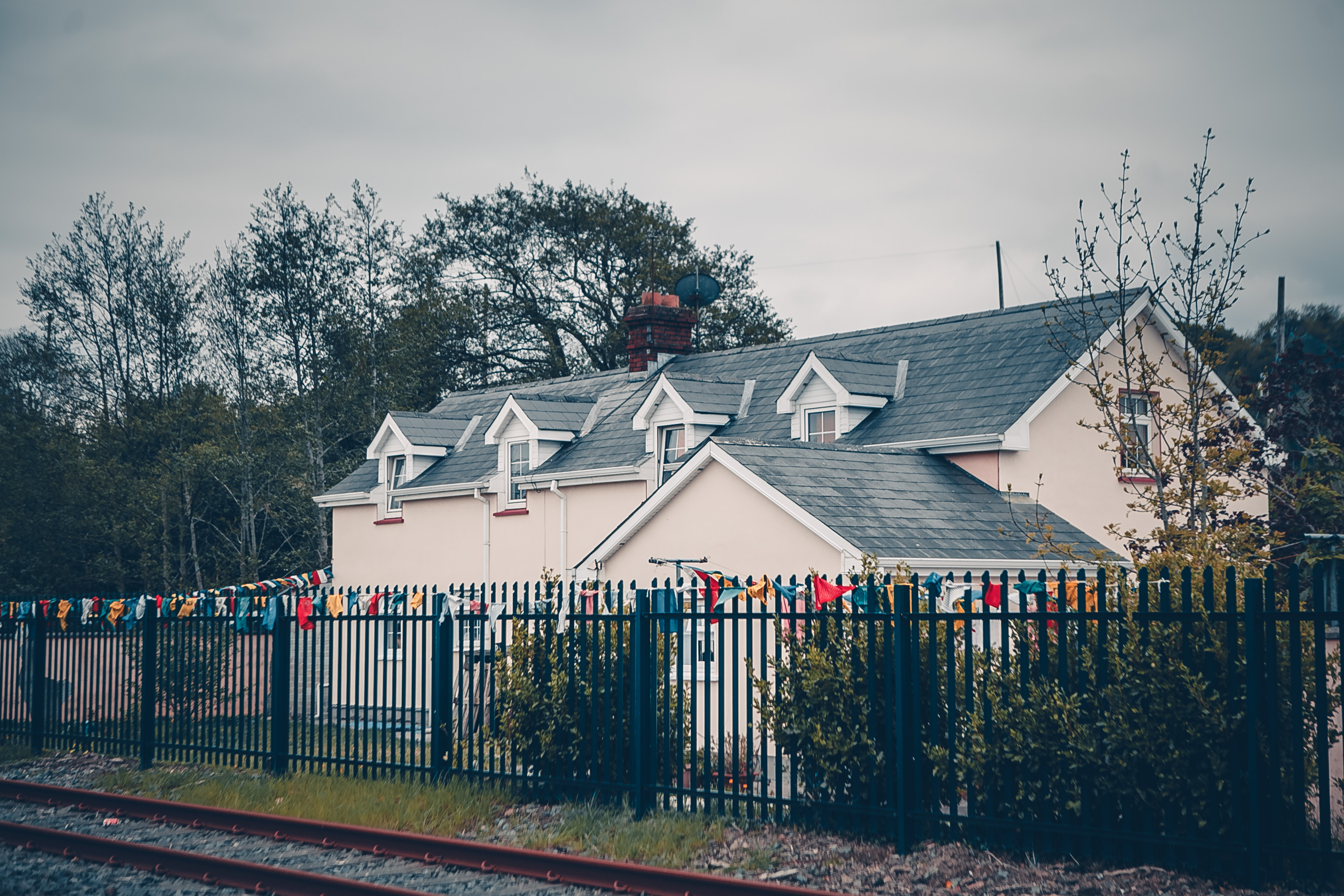
Palpung Ireland Buddhist Centre in Banteer, County Cork

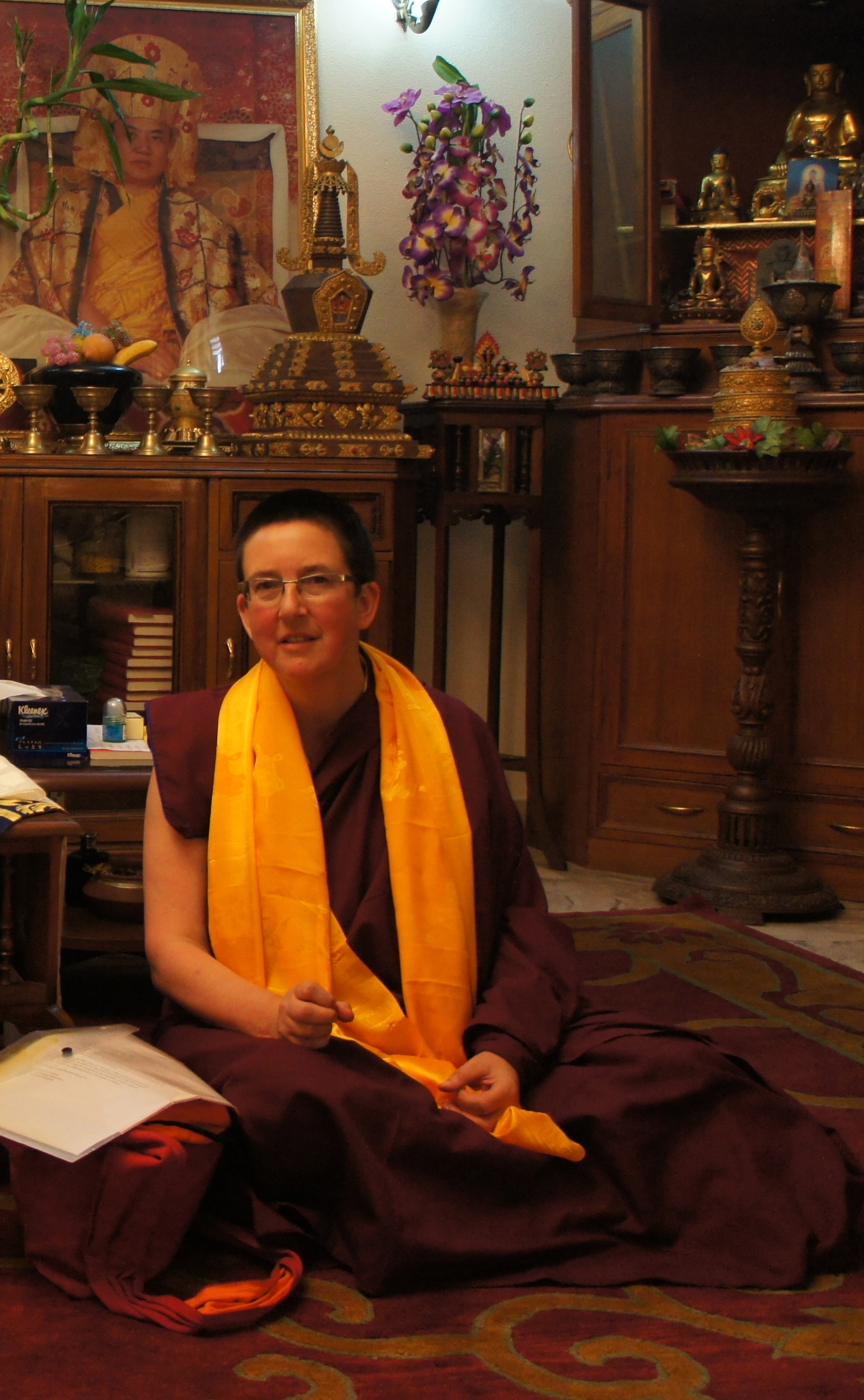
Ani Choedrun Lhamo, the resident teacher.

Palpung Ireland is a Vajrayana (commonly known as Tibetan) Buddhist Centre with branches in Cork city and Banteer, County Cork. It is part of the Karma Kagyu tradition of Buddhism of which the supreme head is the 17th Galwa Karmapa, Ogyen Trinley Dorje. The director and spiritual head of Palpung Ireland is the Guru Vajradhara 12th Chamgon Kenting Tai Situ Pa Rinpoche. Palpung Ireland is a branch of the Palpung foundation based in Palpung Sherabling Monastery Monastic Seat in India with branches worldwide. Ani Choedrun Lhamo an Irish Buddhist nun is the resident teacher.

== Mission statement ==
"As a Buddhist Centre Our primary purpose is the preservation of the precious teachings of the Buddha which have been handed down in an unbroken lineage form the Buddha to the present day lineage holders. It is our duty to preserve these invaluable teachings and practices and to make them available to anyone wishing to practice them in order to benefit themselves and others."
