= Traleg Kyabgon Rinpoche =

Tibetan Buddhist tulku (1955–2012)

Traleg Kyabgon Rinpoche (1955–2012) was the ninth incarnation of the Traleg tulku line, a line of high lamas in the Kagyu lineage of Vajrayana. He was a pioneer in bringing Tibetan Buddhism to Australia.

== Biography ==
Traleg Rinpoche was born in 1955 in Kham (Eastern Tibet), and two years later was recognized by HH 16th Gyalwa Karmapa as the ninth incarnation of the Traleg Tulkus and enthroned as the Abbot of the Thrangu Monastery. He was taken to safety in India during the 1959 Chinese Communists invasion of Tibet. There he was given a traditional tulku education, supplemented by five years of schooling at Sanskrit University in Varanasi, India. He lived and studied for several years at Rumtek Monastery in Sikkim, the main seat in exile of the Kagyu Lineage. He died on July 24, 2012, in Melbourne, Australia.

== Teaching in the West ==
In 1980 Rinpoche came to Australia with Dechen, a young Jewish woman whom he married in January 1981, having relinquished his monastic vows in Rumtek before they left to be together in Australia, where he transmitted the Dharma and soon thereafter established Kagyu E-vam Buddhist Institute in Melbourne. He earned a master's degree in Comparative Philosophy from La Trobe University. In 1989, he taught extensively at Karma Triyana Dharmachakra, visiting the North American affiliates of HH Gyalwa Karmapa. In 2004 he established the Evam Institute in New York in Chatham, NY. He also taught extensively in the Karma Thegsum Choling network of the Karmapa's centers and at Shambhala Buddhist centers. His second wife, Felicity Lodro, is also an active dharma teacher.

== See also ==
- Thrangu Rinpoche
- Nalandabodhi
- Shambhala Buddhism

== Bibliography ==
- Luminous Bliss: self realisation through meditation, by Traleg Kyabgon, Lothian Books (2003), ISBN 0-7344-0584-7
- The Benevolent Mind, by Traleg Kyabgon, Zhi-sil Cho-kyi Gha-Tsal Publications (2003), ISBN 1-877294-28-4
- The Essence of Buddhism, by Traleg Kyabgon, Shambhala (2001), ISBN 1-57062-468-2
- Mind at Ease, by Traleg Kyabgon, Shambhala (2004), ISBN 1-59030-156-0
- The Practice of Lojong, by Traleg Kyabgon, Shambhala (2007), ISBN 1-59030-378-4
- The Influence of Yogacara on Mahamudra, by Traleg Kyabgon, KTD Publications (2010), ISBN 978-1-934608-19-7
- The Ninth Karmapa, Wanchuk Dorje’s Ocean of Certainty, by Traleg Kyabgon, KTD Publications (2011), ISBN 978-1-934608-20-3
- The Essence of Buddhism: An Introduction to Its Philosophy and Practice, by Traleg Kyabgon, Shambhala; Reissue edition (2014), ISBN 978-1590307885
- Karma: What It Is, What It Isn't, Why It Matters, by Traleg Kyabgon, Shambhala (2015), ISBN 978-1-590308-88-2
- Moonbeams of Mahamudra: The Classic Meditation Manual, Traleg Kyabgon (translator), Shogam Publications (2016), ISBN 0980502233
