= 6th Karmapa, Thongwa Dönden =

Karmapa of Kagyu Tibetan Buddhism (1416–1453)

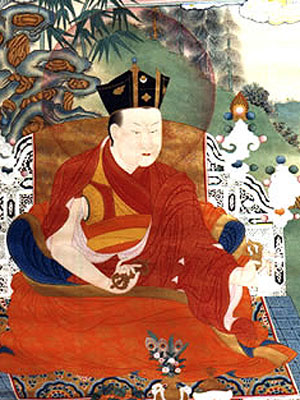
The 6th Karmapa, Thongwa Dönden (1416–1453)

The 6th Karmapa, Thongwa Dönden (1416–1453) or Tongwa Donden (Wylie: kar ma pa 06 mthong ba don ldan), was the sixth Gyalwa Karmapa, head of the Karma Kagyu School of Tibetan Buddhism. Thongwa Dönden was born in Ngomto Shakyam near Karma Gon in Kham. He was recognized during his first visit at the Karma Gon Monastery and joined the monastery to be taught by the 3rd Sharmapa.

Up to then, the Kagyu lineage had mainly given emphasis on meditation and considered rituals and prayers of lesser importance and therefore it had been neglected. In response, the 6th Karmapa then composed many prayers and rituals. He was also very active with the printing and copying of Buddhist texts and the founding of a Buddhist university.

The 6th Karmapa strengthened the lineage by having the Shangpa and Shijay lineage join their lineage and making sure that the different teachings were compatible with each other.

Preceded by Deshin Shekpa	Reincarnation of the Karmapa	Succeeded by Chödrak Gyatso
