= Third Bardor Tulku Rinpoche =

Tibetan religious leader (1949 - 2021)

The Third Bardor Tulku Rinpoche
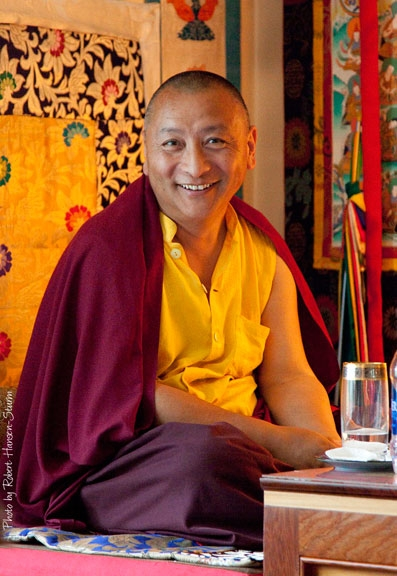
- Born: May 1, 1949; Kham, East Tibet
- Died: April 1, 2021 (aged 71); Bearsville, New York
- Occupation: Buddhist teacher

The Third Bardor Tulku Rinpoche' (Tibetan: འབར་རྡོར་སྤྲུལ་སྐུ།, Wylie: bar-rdor sprul-sku; May 1, 1949 – April 1, 2021) was a Tibetan Buddhist teacher, a holder of the religious lineage of Terchen Barway Dorje. Rinpoche is the founder of a Tibetan Buddhist center, Kunzang Palchen Ling, and the Raktrul Foundation, in Red Hook, New York.

== Biography ==
Born in 1949 in Kham, East Tibet, the Third Bardor Tulku Rinpoche is believed, according to Tibetan Buddhist tradition, to be a rebirth of a nineteenth/twentieth century meditation master, Terchen Barway Dorje (1836–1920).

After the failed 1959 Tibetan uprising, Rinpoche and his family left Tibet for India. The journey on foot over the Himalayas and later the tropical climate of Assam killed Rinpoche's family. Rinpoche eventually traveled to Darjeeling where the 16th Karmapa (1924–1981) found him and arranged for him to be taken to Rumtek Monastery in Sikkim.

The Third Bardor Tulku Rinpoche is mentioned among the prominent lamas of the Kagyu tradition of Tibetan Buddhism. He underwent his training as a tulku (reincarnate lama) under the tutelage of the 16th Karmapa at Rumtek Monastery. He remained close to the Karmapa throughout his life, serving as his attendant and traveling with him overseas. At his request, he stayed in the United States to help Khenpo Karthar Rinpoche and Mr. Tenzin Chonyi establish the Karmapa's Seat in North America, Karma Triyana Dharmachakra. Rinpoche started teaching in the West in 1980s. He has taught at KTD and its affiliates, at other Buddhist centers in the United States and abroad, as well lectured at universities and other venues. Some of his teachings have been published as books and DVDs.

In 2000, Bardor Tulku Rinpoche established the Raktrul Foundation and in 2003 a Tibetan Buddhist center, Kunzang Palchen Ling (KPL), in Red Hook, New York. A ceremony of a symbolic breaking of the ground for the new building at KPL was held in 2006.

In the fall of 2008, Bardor Tulku Rinpoche resigned from his responsibilities at KTD and was focusing fully on the activities of KPL. In February 2012, Bardor Tulku Rinpoche's vision for the new center became reality as KPL received the Certificate of Occupancy for the first floor of its new building.

KPL is a Buddhist center that offers teachings from the rich and diverse Tibetan Buddhist tradition. One of the significant traits of KPL's activity is providing access to and the preservation of the treasure (terma) teachings of Terchen Barway Dorje and the teachings of the Barom Kagyu lineage. In addition to overseeing translations of Terchen Barway Dorje's treasure teachings into English, Bardor Tulku Rinpoche himself composed liturgies and songs (dohas). Rinpoche also guided the activities of Kunzang Chöling centers affiliated with KPL and Palchen Study Groups in the U.S.

Bardor Tulku Rinpoche travelled and taught across the U.S. His teaching schedule can be found on the KPL website.

== Bibliography ==
- Practice of Green Tara, 1999, Rinchen Publications
- Tashi Prayer, 2000, Rinchen Publications
- Living in Compassion, 2004, Rinchen Publications
- Rest for the Fortunate: The Extraordinary Practice of Nyungne, 2004, Rinchen Publications, ISBN 0-9714554-3-0
- A Practitioner's Guide to Mantra, Snow Lion Publications

== Teachings on DVD ==
- Preparing for Death and Dying (1999) Vajra Echoes
- Twenty-One Praises to Tara (1999) Vajra Echoes
- Life of Yeshe Tsogyal (2008) Karma Kagyu Institute

== See also ==
- Dzogchen
- Mahamudra
- Vajrayana Buddhism
