= Thrangu Monastery =

Tibetan Buddhist monastery in Yushu Prefecture, China

- Tibetan transcription(s); Tibetan: གཡེར་པ; Chinese transcription(s); Traditional: 創古寺; Simplified: 创古寺; Pinyin: Chuànggǔ Sì
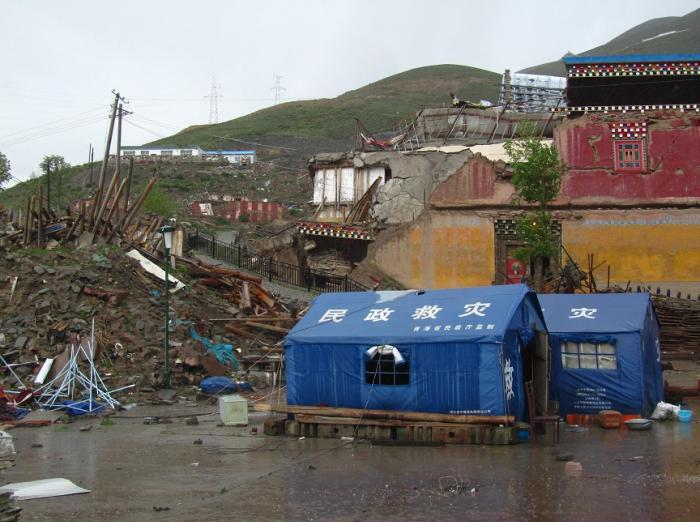

- Location within Qinghai province

Religion
- Affiliation: Tibetan Buddhism
- Sect: Kargyu
- Leadership: Thrangu Rinpoche

Location
- Location: Yushu Prefecture, Qinghai, China
- Country: China
- Interactive map of Thrangu Monastery
- Coordinates: 32°57′30″N 97°01′0″E

Architecture
- Founder: the Seventh Karmapa
- Completed: 12th century

Thrangu Monastery is located about 7 km south of Jyekundo in the Yushu Tibetan Autonomous Prefecture of Qinghai province, China, or the traditional Tibetan cultural region of Kham.

== Description ==
Prior to the huge earthquake on 16 April 2010 (see next section), the monastery, which was magnificently located on grasslands backed by a huge wall of granite, consisted of two buildings about 70 metres apart, known as the upper and lower monasteries. The monastery was approached from the road past a row of eight stupas.

The "lower monastery" had a renovated assembly hall with 80 pillars, gilded images of the 'Buddhas of the Three Times', and murals showing the previous 16 Karmapa Lamas. There were also images of Milarepa, a four-armed Avalokiteshvara, Padmasambhava and Shakyamuni seated on a throne.

The "upper monastery", completely destroyed in the 2010 earthquake, had been restored in 1998, and had an image of Shakyamuni Buddha, flanked by the 'Thousand Buddhas' and an image of Vajradhara. The fine Repkong-style murals depicted the 'Twelve Deeds of Shakyamuni'. The outlying buildings were used by people from the neighbouring village to store grain.

About 10 km northwest up a side road one comes to the rock inscriptions in both Tibetan and Chinese at Bida, some of which are claimed to have been naturally produced, linking the region with the Chinese Princess Wencheng who is said to have stayed here for one month on her way to marry king Songtsen Gampo, circa 640 CE, in Lhasa. There is a large engraved image of Princess Wencheng on a cliff behind the monastery. The Tibetan name for the site is Nampar Nangdze Lhakang. There is a temple here which was previously under the care of the Drigung Kagyu school but, more recently had been looked after by the monks from Thrangu.

== 2010 Yushu earthquake ==
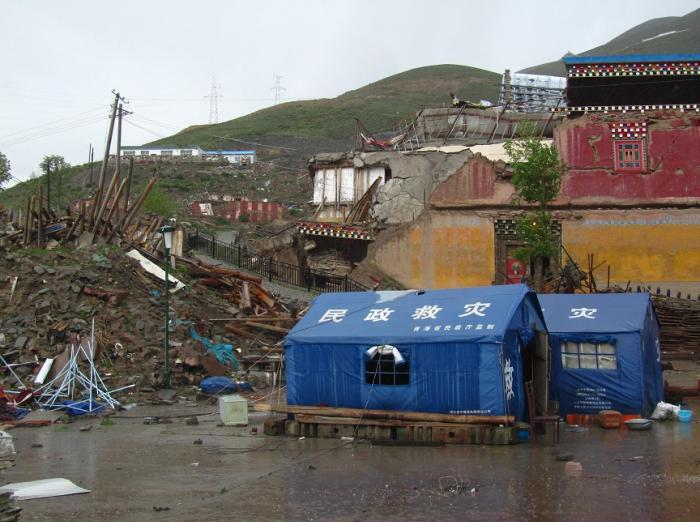
Ruins of Thrangu Monastery [2012]

Thrangu Monastery and the surrounding areas, including nearby Jyekundo or Gyêgu town, the regional capital, were severely damaged in the 2010 Yushu earthquake. Many monks and thousands of laypeople died. A report filed on 16 April 2010 stated:

"Khenpo drove to Thrangu monastery yesterday, after I spoke to him on the phone, because he heard that the damage was so severe there. He said that there were a lot of people digging in the ruins there but the monastery is in very bad shape. None of the monks’ housing there is still standing. The Mahakala shrine building collapsed. The main lhakang [Assembly Hall] is still standing but is heavily damaged and will have to be rebuilt. He asked people there how many monks had died and was told that no one knows yet. One monk told him sixty to seventy monks had died and another told him at least thirty. There are also two villages very close to Thrangu monastery and he said that they are completely destroyed without a single house still standing so a lot of people must have died there as well. He said that Aten Rinpoche has two cousins who were killed at Thrangu monastery."

The earthquake struck on April 14, 2010, and registered a magnitude of 6.9M_{w} (USGS, EMSC) or 7.1M_{s} (CEA, CENC). It originated in Yushu, Qinghai, China, at 7:49 am local time. According to the Xinhua News Agency, 2,698 people have been confirmed dead, 270 missing, and 12,135 injured of which 1,434 are severely injured. The epicenter was located in Rima village (日玛村/日麻村), Upper Laxiu township (上拉秀乡) of Yushu County, in remote and rugged terrain, near the border of Tibet Autonomous Region. The epicenter is about 30 km from Jyekundo or Gyêgu town, the seat of Yushu County, and about 240 km from Qamdo. The epicenter was in a sparsely populated area on the Tibetan plateau that is regularly hit by earthquakes.

== Yushu New Thrangu Gompa ==
For the monastery's reconstruction a new site a few kilometres further south was chosen. Its location near Mahavairocana Temple, also known by the name "Wencheng Temple", which Thrangu's monks traditionally take care of, is at the entrance of the small gorge to the main valley. The reconstruction work was financially supported by the Chinese government. The new monastery was completed in mid-August 2015.

== New Thrangu Monastery opens in Canada ==
Thrangu Monastery, Canada's first traditional Tibetan Buddhist monastery, was officially opened in Richmond, British Columbia, on 25 July 2010 by Khenchen Thrangu Rinpoche, the worldwide leader of Thrangu Monasteries.

The Assembly Hall of the new monastery contains a four-metre tall gold-plated statue of Shakyamuni Buddha, "filled with precious offerings including scriptures, scrolls and sacred stones and pebbles from 108 different countries, including China(including Hong Kong and Tibet), India, Sri Lanka and Canada. The shrine hall can comfortably accommodate up to 500 people."
