= Galden Jampaling Monastery =

Buddhist monastery in Chamdo, Tibet

Coordinates: 31.1433°N 97.1778°E

Galden Jampaling Monastery (Tibetan: བྱམས་པ་གླིང, Wylie: byams pa gling) is a Buddhist monastery in the Chamdo Town, Tibet, China. Each year on 16 March the temple celebrates the Butter Sculpture Festival with the spectacular "Guqing" God Dance.

== Bibliography ==
- Buckley, Michael and Straus, Robert (1986): Tibet: a travel survival kit, Lonely Planet Publications. South Yarra, Victoria, Australia. ISBN 0-908086-88-1.
- Gruschke, Andreas (2004): Chamdo town in: The Cultural Monuments of Tibet’s Outer Provinces: Kham - vol. 1. The TAR part of Kham, White Lotus Press, Bangkok 2004, pp. 36–45. ISBN 974-480-049-6
- Mayhew, Bradley and Kohn, Michael. (2005). Tibet. 6th Edition. Lonely Planet. ISBN 1-74059-523-8
