= Palpung Monastery =

Tibetan Buddhist monastery in Babang, Sichuan, China

- Tibetan transcription(s); Tibetan: དཔལ་སྤུངས། Wylie transliteration: dpal spungs
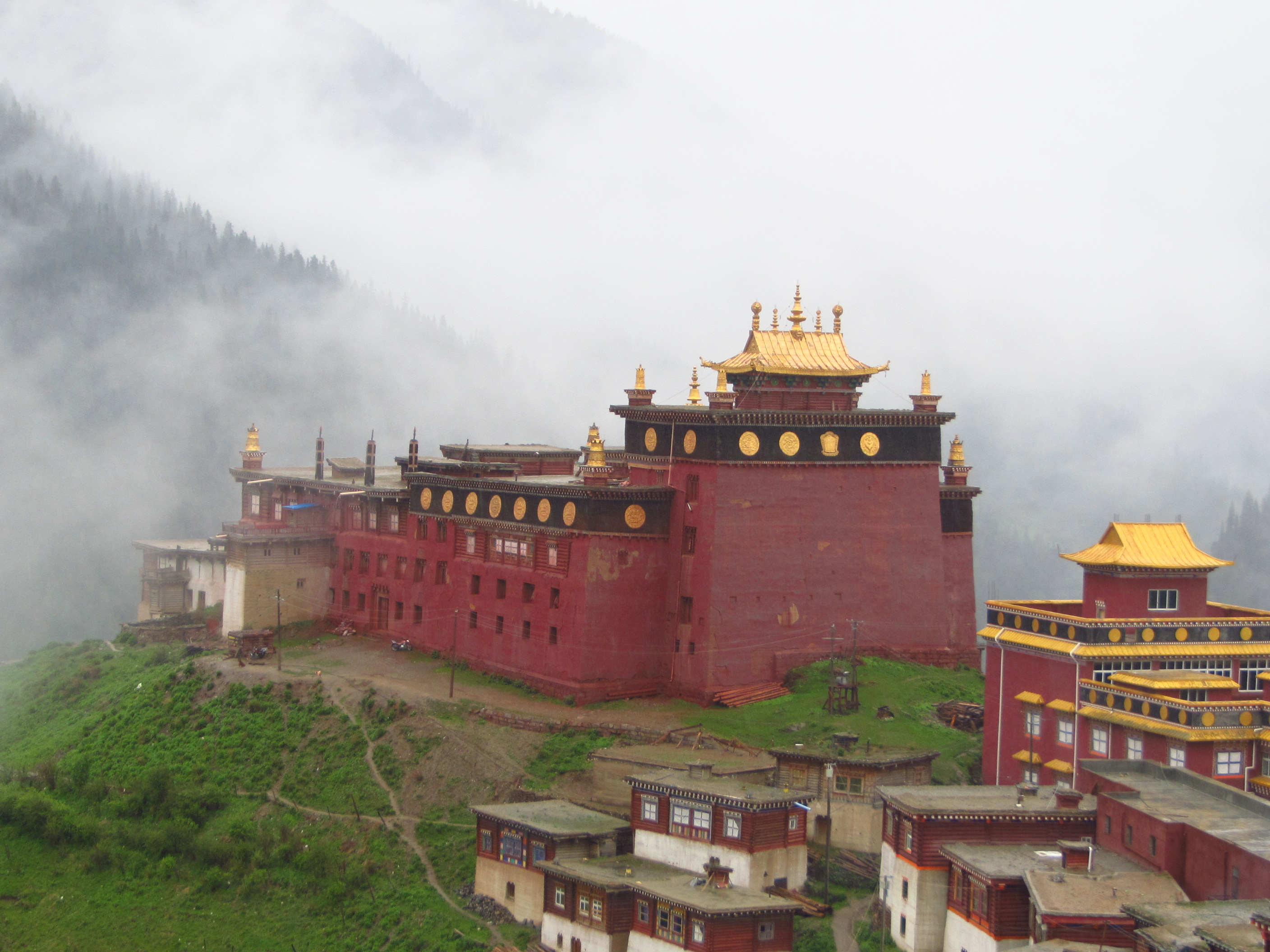
- View of Palpung Monastery in 2014

- Location within Sichuan

Religion
- Affiliation: Tibetan Buddhism
- Sect: Karma Kagyu

Location
- Location: Babang, Dêgê County, Garzê Tibetan Autonomous Prefecture, Sichuan, China
- Country: China
- Interactive map of Palpung Monastery
- Coordinates: 31°38′54″N 98°47′45″E

Architecture
- Founder: 8th Tai Situ
- Established: 1727; 299 years ago
- Protected 1958. Reopened as monastery in 1982.

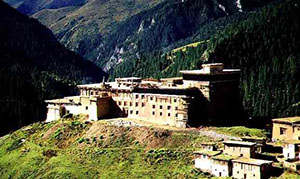
Palpung Monastery before its restoration

Palpung Monastery (Tibetan: དཔལ་སྤུངས།, Wylie: dpal spungs dgon pa) is Tai Situ's historic monastic seat in Babang, Kham (modern Sichuan). Palpung means "glorious union of study and practice". It originated in the 12th century and wielded considerable religious, political, and economic influence over the centuries.

The current monastery was founded in 1727 by the 8th Tai Situ "Situ Panchen" with the great support of the Dharma King of Derge Temba Tsering. It is the seat of four lines of incarnate lamas, the best-known being the Tai Situ as well as the Jamgon Kongtrul and the Second Beru Khyentse. The gompa has historically been associated with the Karmapas: for instance, Rangjung Rigpe Dorje, 16th Karmapa, was enthroned first at Palpung before traveling to his main seat at Tsurphu Monastery in Ü-Tsang.

The 12th Tai Situ, Pema Tönyö Nyinje, has established another monastic seat in exile at Palpung Sherab Ling Monastery (Wylie: dpal spungs shes rab gling in India's state of Himachal Pradesh near the city of Baijnath. Palpung Yeshe Rabgye Ling Nunnery is nearby in the city of Manali, in the town Bunthar about a 3 hour drive from the Palpung Sherab Ling Monastery.).

== History ==
Palpung Monastery is the historical seat of the successive incarnations of the Chamgon Kenting Tai Situpas in Kham. It is also the mother monastery of the Karma Kagyu in Kham and evolved into the center of the Rimé movement. The seat in exile, outside of Tibet, Sherabling Monastery, is in India. The congregation has monasteries and centers around the world.

=== Palpung in Tibet ===
Palpung Monastery is a gompa in Babang Township, Dêgê County, Garzê Tibetan Autonomous Prefecture in western Sichuan. It has historically always been associated with the Karmapas such as the 16th Karmapa being enthroned first at Palpung before traveling to his main seat at Tsurphu Monastery in Ü-Tsang. The Karmapas and Tai Situpas have been connected closely over time, alternating as master and disciple.

Palpung originated in the 12th century and wielded considerable religious influence over the centuries. Palpung Monastery was founded by the 8th Tai Situpa "Situ Panchen" in 1727 and developed into a preeminent center of learning and scholarship on the eastern Tibetan plateau. The monastery once hosted more than 1000 monks and had one of the most leading monastic universities of the area. It is the seat of various lines of incarnate lamas, the best known being the Tai Situpa and the Jamgon Kongtrul.

Palpung was known for its huge library with more than 324,000 texts and an art collection of more than 10,150 thangkas. It was also leading in the fields of spiritual painting and the Situ Rinpoche is the founder of Karma Gadri painting style. At the time of the 11th Tai Situ Rinpoche, Palpung was already famous for spiritual, studious and artistic excellence and authority.

Social turmoil from the late 1950s to 1976 brought destruction of some monastery buildings and neglected maintenance to Palpung's main temple. Construction and repair, initially funded by the government, then later by the 12th Tai Situpa and others, commenced in the late 1980s. Palpung's main temple was recognized in 2013 as a national cultural heritage site, having previously been a provincial-level site. It was named to the World Monuments Watch list in 1998 and 2000.

There are an estimated 800 monks residing in the monastery itself and a larger number resident in the surrounding region.

=== Palpung in India ===
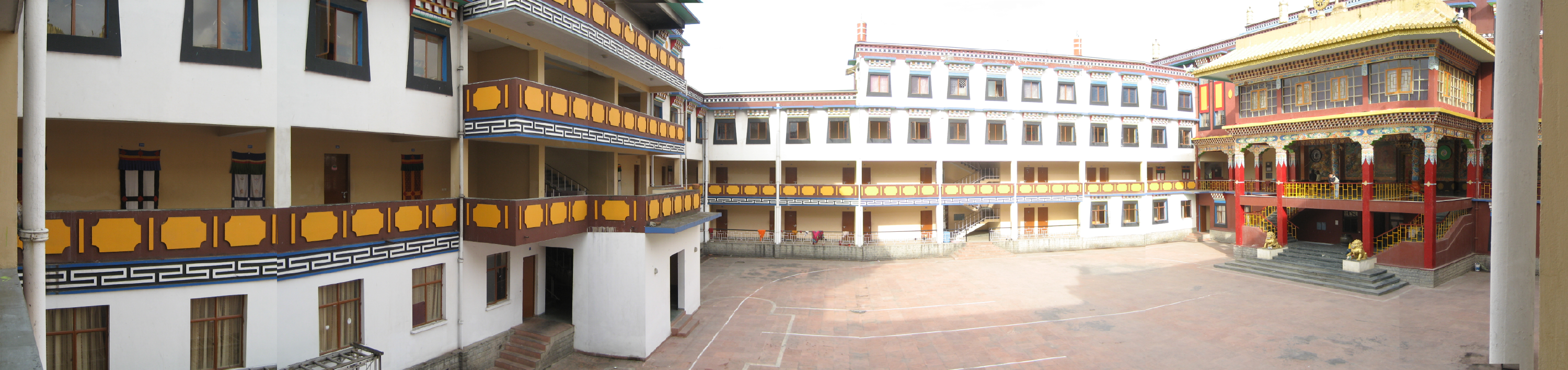
Sherap Monastery in Himachal Pradesh, North India

Pema Tönyö Nyinje, the 12th Tai Situpa, fled from Kham to Bhutan and then India at the age of six, where he consequently received his formal traditional training under Rangjung Rigpe Dorje, 16th Karmapa. At the age of 22 he started to set up his seat in exile, Palpung Sherabling Monastery, in Himachal Pradesh, North India.

Palpung Sherabling Monastery currently has approximately 1,000 monks; 250 are enrolled in the monastic university curriculum on the premises. Palpung Yeshe Rabgyeling Nun Monastery is located near the city of Manali, in the Bunthar town has about 200 nuns. The Monastery also offers the traditional Kagyu three-year retreat for both monks and nuns on the compound.

== Palpung Congregation ==
The Palpung congregation consists of more than 180 monasteries and temples throughout some Chinese and Tibetan districts. Palpung Congregation also has branch institutions in Europe, USA, Canada Oceania and Asia altogether about 300 branches world wide. Its European Seat is Palpung Yeshe Chökhor Ling Europe, Palpung Europe which was established and is under the direction of Chöje Lama Gelongma Palmo.

== See also ==
- Palpung Ireland Buddhist Centre
- Tibetan Buddhism
