= Langschlag =

- Municipality
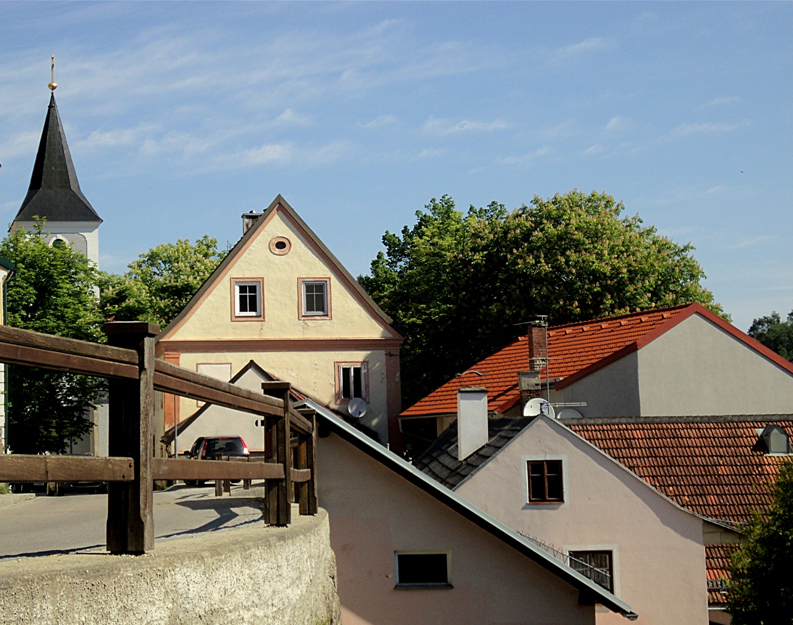
- Langschlag town centre

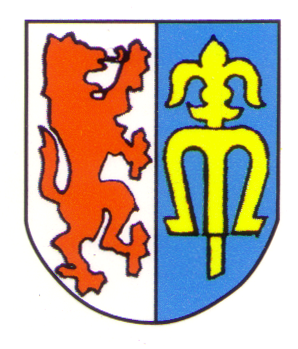
- Coat of arms

- Location within Austria
- Coordinates: 48°34′40.13″N 14°53′4.80″E
- Country: Austria
- State: Lower Austria
- District: Zwettl

Government
  - Mayor: Herbert Gottsbachner (ÖVP)

Area
  - Total: 61.01 km^{2} (23.56 sq mi)
- Elevation: 765 m (2,510 ft)

Population (2018-01-01)
  - Total: 1,782
  - Density: 29.21/km^{2} (75.65/sq mi)
- Time zone: UTC+1 (CET)
  - Summer (DST): UTC+2 (CEST)
- Postal code: 3921
- Area code: 02814
- Vehicle registration: ZT
- Website: www.langschlag.gv.at

Langschlag is a municipality in the district of Zwettl in the Austrian state of Lower Austria.

== Population ==
Historical population
Year	Pop.	±%
1971	1,655	—
1981	1,914	+15.6%
1991	1,978	+3.3%
2001	2,008	+1.5%

== See also ==
- Palpung Europe
