= Chengguan, Chamdo =

Chengguan 城关镇 · ཁྲིན་ཀོན་རྡལ།
- Town
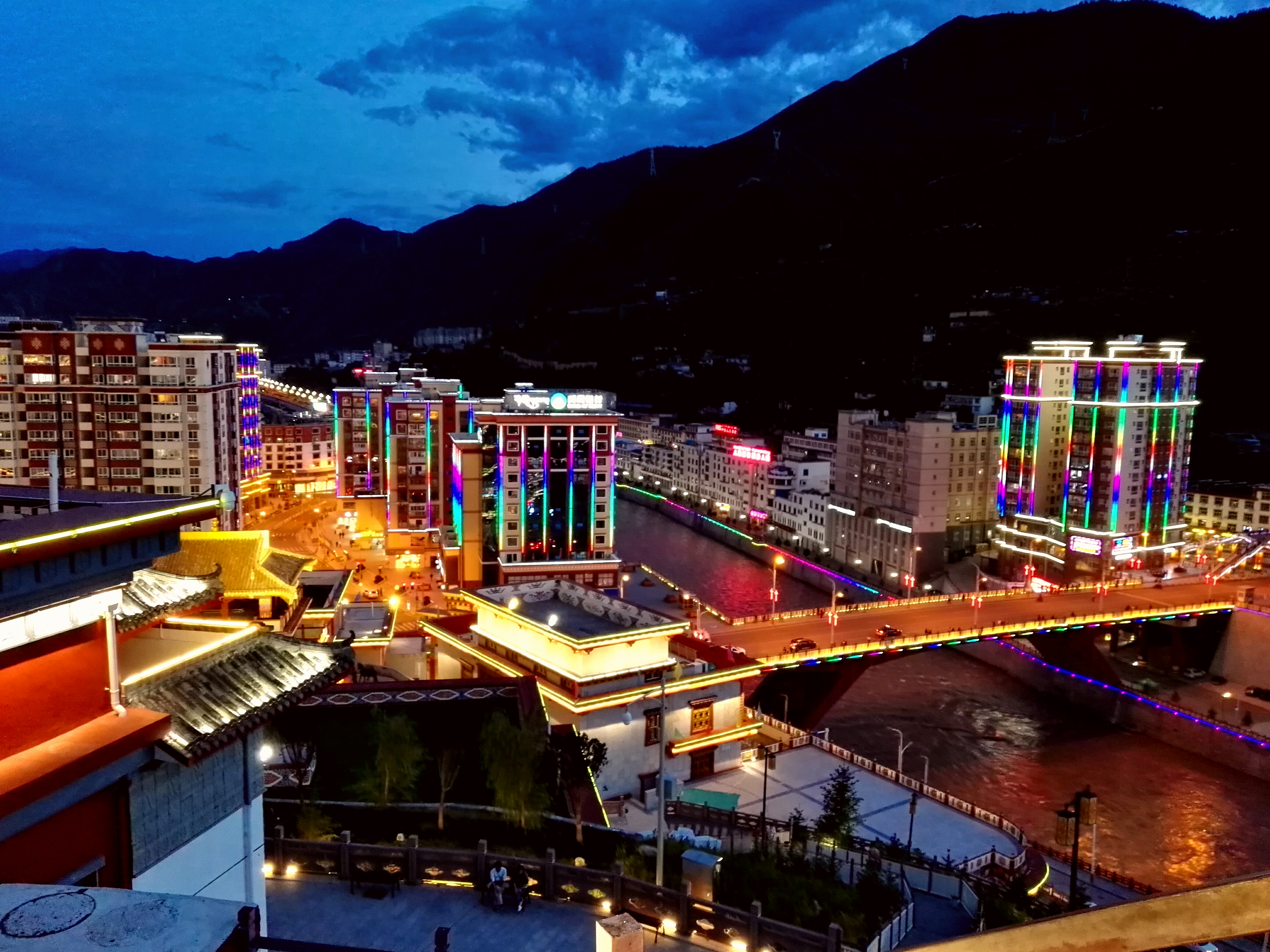

- Location in Tibet Autonomous Region
- Coordinates: 31°08′27″N 97°10′19″E
- Country: China
- Autonomous region: Tibet Autonomous Region
- Prefecture: Qamdo
- District: Karub

Area
  - Total: 195.39 km^{2} (75.44 sq mi)
- Elevation: 3,256 m (10,682 ft)

Population (2010)
  - Total: 45,861
- Time zone: UTC+08:00 (China Standard)

Chengguan (Tibetan: ཁྲེང་ཀོན་གྲོང་རྡལ, Wylie: Khreng kon grong rdal, ZWPY: Chênggoin Chongdai; Chinese: 城关镇; pinyin: Chéngguān Zhèn) is a major town in the historical region of Kham in the eastern Tibet Autonomous Region of China. It is the seat of Karub District and Chamdo Prefecture, and had a population of 45,861 in 2010. It is located about 600 km (370 mi) east of Lhasa. By road, the distance is 1,120 km (700 mi) via the southern route or 1,030 km (640 mi) via the northern route. It is at an altitude of 3,230 m (10,600 ft) at the confluence of the rivers Za Qu and Ngom Qu which form the Lancang River (Mekong).

At the turn of the 20th century it had a population of about 12,000, a quarter of whom were monks.

== Galden Jampaling Monastery ==
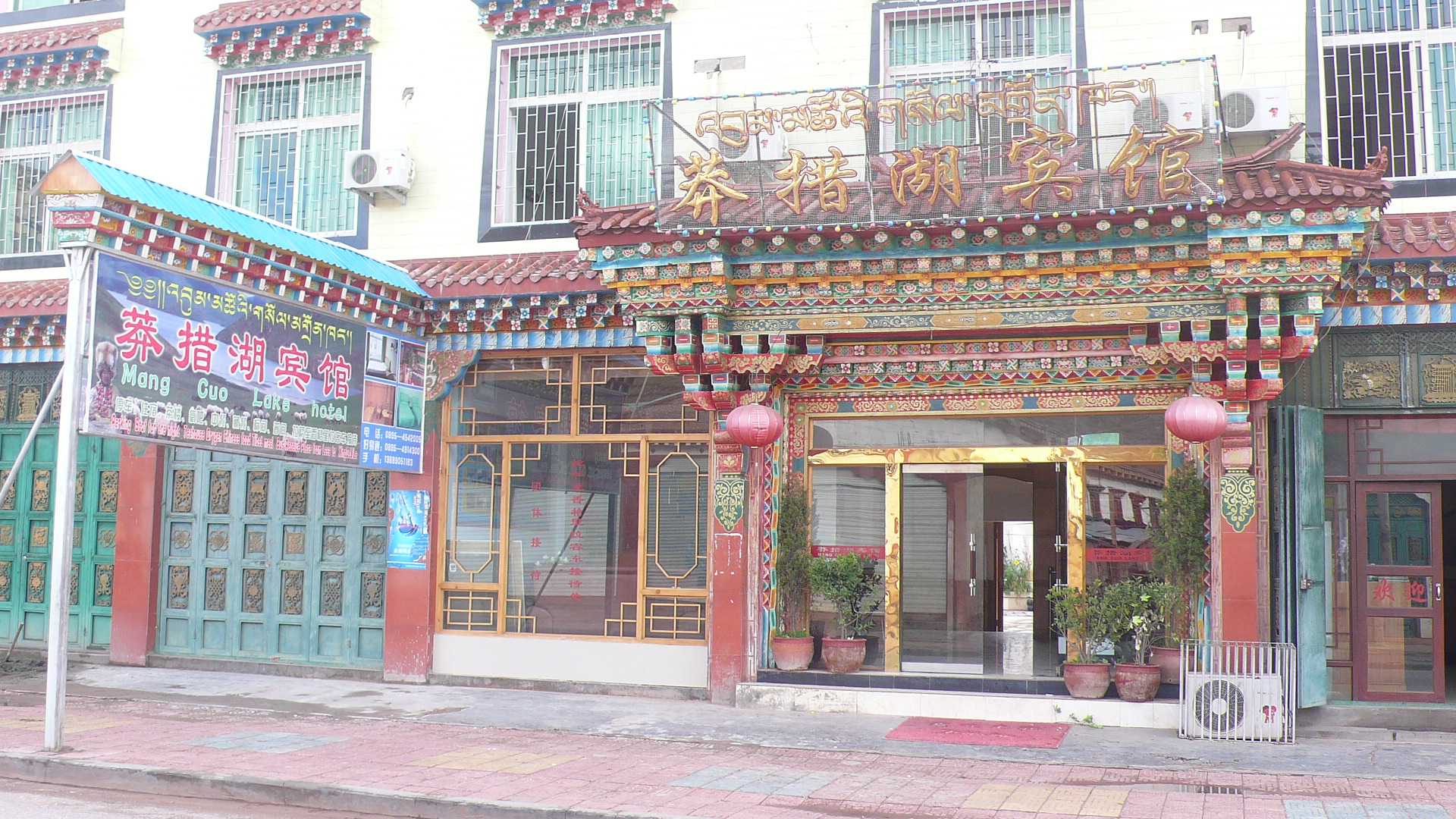
Mang Cuo Lake Hotel in Chengguan

Chengguan was visited by Je Tsongkhapa in 1373 who suggested a monastery be built there. Galden Jampaling Monastery was constructed between 1436 and 1444 by a disciple of Tsongkhapa, Jansem Sherab Zangpo. It is also known as the Changbalin or Qiangbalin Si Monastery. At its height it contained five main temples and housed some 2,500 monks. It was destroyed in 1912 but the main hall (which was used as a prison) and two other buildings survived, and it was rebuilt in 1917 after the Tibetan army retook Chengguan. It now houses about 800 monks.

== Climate ==
Chengguan experiences a climate that is a transition between a humid continental and subtropical highland climate (Köppen Dwb and Cwb), with warm, wet summers and very dry, frosty winters. The monthly 24-hour average temperature ranges from −1.2 °C (29.8 °F) in January to 17.1 °C (62.8 °F) in July, with an annual mean of 8.60 °C (47.5 °F). Due to the high elevation, the diurnal temperature variation is large throughout the year, averaging 16.0 °C (28.8 °F) annually.

Climate data for Qamdo
Month	Jan	Feb	Mar	Apr	May	Jun	Jul	Aug	Sep	Oct	Nov	Dec	Year
Record high °C (°F)	20.1 (68.2)	21.4 (70.5)	26.1 (79.0)	26.7 (80.1)	29.8 (85.6)	32.0 (89.6)	33.4 (92.1)	30.8 (87.4)	29.5 (85.1)	27.7 (81.9)	22.9 (73.2)	20.2 (68.4)	33.4 (92.1)
Mean daily maximum °C (°F)	8.0 (46.4)	9.8 (49.6)	13.0 (55.4)	16.4 (61.5)	20.8 (69.4)	23.5 (74.3)	23.9 (75.0)	23.4 (74.1)	21.2 (70.2)	17.4 (63.3)	12.5 (54.5)	9.0 (48.2)	16.6 (61.9)
Daily mean °C (°F)	−1.2 (29.8)	1.3 (34.3)	5.1 (41.2)	8.7 (47.7)	12.9 (55.2)	16.2 (61.2)	17.1 (62.8)	16.4 (61.5)	14.1 (57.4)	9.4 (48.9)	3.5 (38.3)	−0.4 (31.3)	8.6 (47.5)
Mean daily minimum °C (°F)	−10.4 (13.3)	−7.2 (19.0)	−2.8 (27.0)	1.0 (33.8)	5.1 (41.2)	8.9 (48.0)	10.3 (50.5)	9.5 (49.1)	7.0 (44.6)	1.5 (34.7)	−5.5 (22.1)	−9.9 (14.2)	0.6 (33.1)
Record low °C (°F)	−19.4 (−2.9)	−15.7 (3.7)	−13.0 (8.6)	−7.7 (18.1)	−4.0 (24.8)	0.4 (32.7)	2.7 (36.9)	1.1 (34.0)	−1.4 (29.5)	−8.7 (16.3)	−14.5 (5.9)	−20.7 (−5.3)	−20.7 (−5.3)
Average precipitation mm (inches)	1.2 (0.05)	4.0 (0.16)	9.6 (0.38)	23.0 (0.91)	39.2 (1.54)	85.2 (3.35)	100.2 (3.94)	96.8 (3.81)	76.1 (3.00)	31.3 (1.23)	5.5 (0.22)	2.4 (0.09)	474.5 (18.68)
Average precipitation days (≥ 0.1 mm)	2.2	3.1	5.7	10.9	13.2	17.9	19.7	18.1	17.8	9.6	5.5	2.4	126.1
Mean monthly sunshine hours	195.3	175.2	189.1	195.0	220.1	201.0	198.4	201.5	192.0	204.6	201.0	204.6	2,377.8
Percentage possible sunshine	61	56	51	50	52	47	46	49	52	58	63	65	54
Source: China Weather (1971−2000), Hong Kong Observatory (sun only, 1961−1990)

== Transportation ==
- China National Highway 214
- China National Highway 317
- Qamdo Bangda Airport

== Notable people ==
- Qiangba Puncog, politician

== See also ==
- History of Tibet
