= Karub, Qamdo =

Karub District 卡若区 • མཁར་རོ་ཆུས། Karuo, Kharro, Chamdo
- District
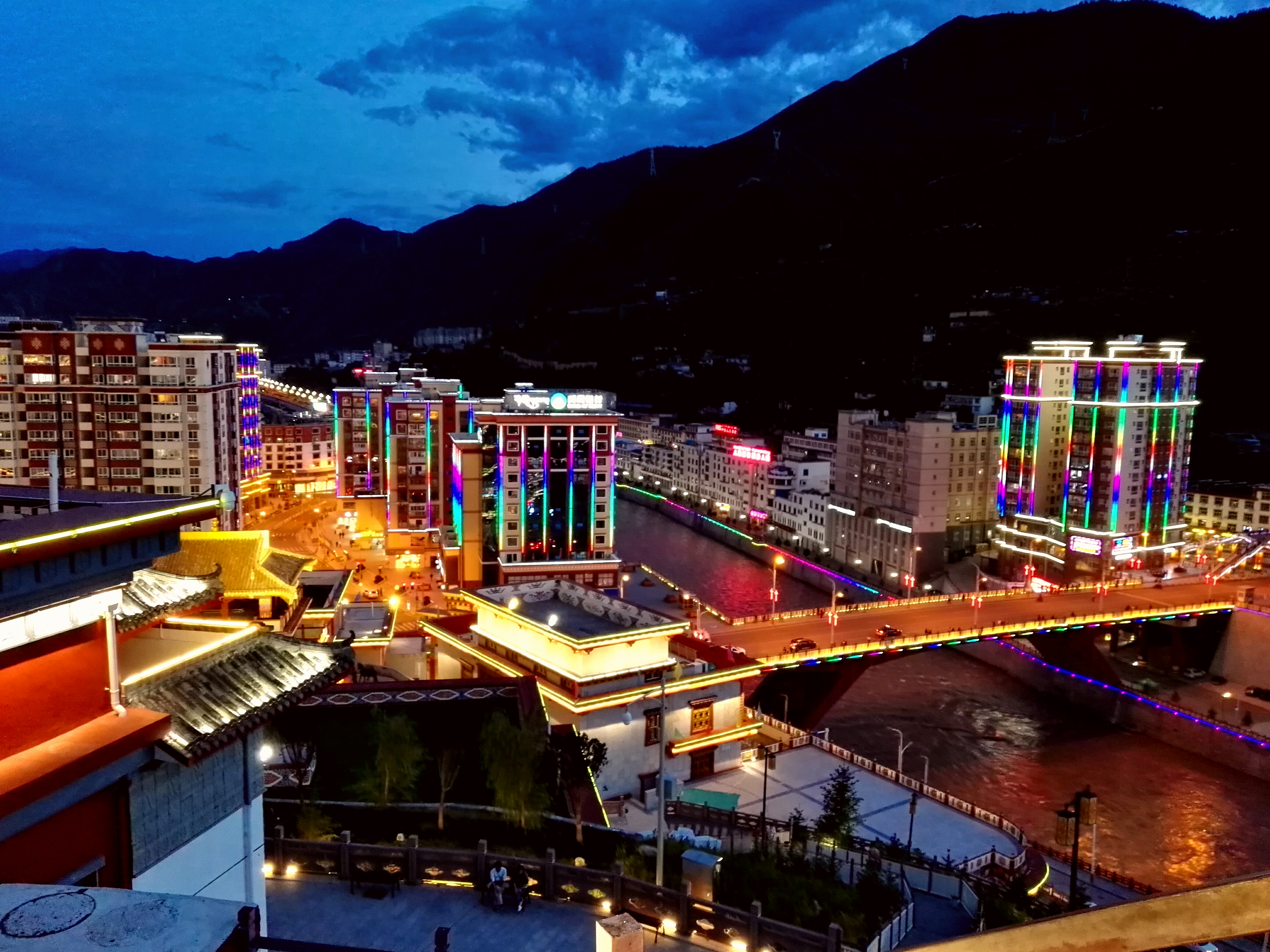

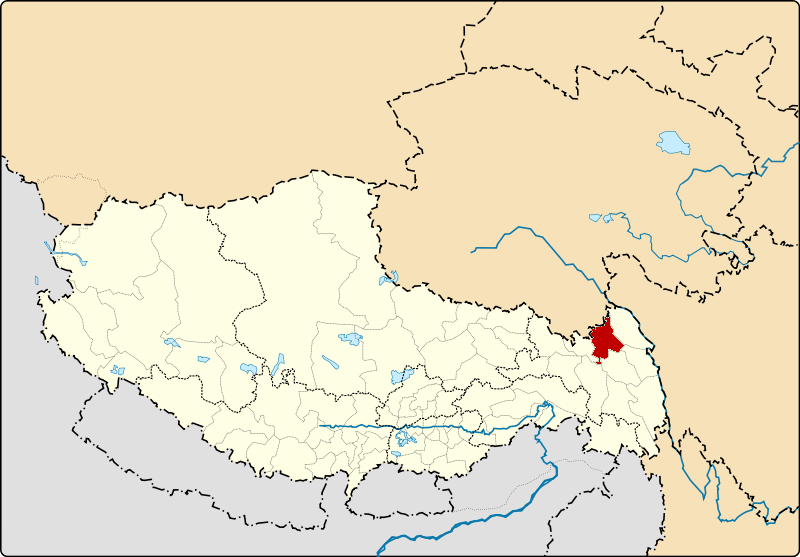
- Location of Karub District within Tibet Autonomous Region

- Location of the seat in the Tibet AR Karub (China)
- Coordinates: 31.143°N 97.170°E
- Country: China
- Autonomous region: Tibet
- Prefecture-level city: Chamdo
- District seat: Chengguan

Area
  - Total: 10,793.22 km^{2} (4,167.29 sq mi)

Population (2020)
  - Total: 148,511
  - Density: 13.7597/km^{2} (35.6373/sq mi)
- Time zone: UTC+8 (China Standard)
- Website: karuo.changdu.gov.cn

Karub, Qamdo

Chinese name
- Simplified Chinese: 卡若区
- Traditional Chinese: 卡若區
Transcriptions
Standard Mandarin
- Hanyu Pinyin: Kǎruò Qū
Yue: Cantonese
- Jyutping: kaa^{1}joek^{6} keoi^{1}

Tibetan name
- Tibetan: མཁར་རོ་ཆུས།
Transcriptions
- Wylie: mkhar ro chus
- THL: Kharro Qü
- Tibetan Pinyin: Karub Qü

Karub District also known as Kharro or Karuo, is a district in Qamdo, in the Tibet Autonomous Region of China, and the seat of government of Qamdo. Karuo has an area of 10,700 km^{2} and a population of 78,000, of which 90% are Tibetan. The average temperature is 7.6 °C, with average temperatures of −2.3 °C in January and 16.3 °C in July. The average precipitation is 467 mm per year.

Popular with tourists are the Galden Jampaling Monastery in the capital and the salt mines and hot springs at Yangjing.

== Administrative divisions ==
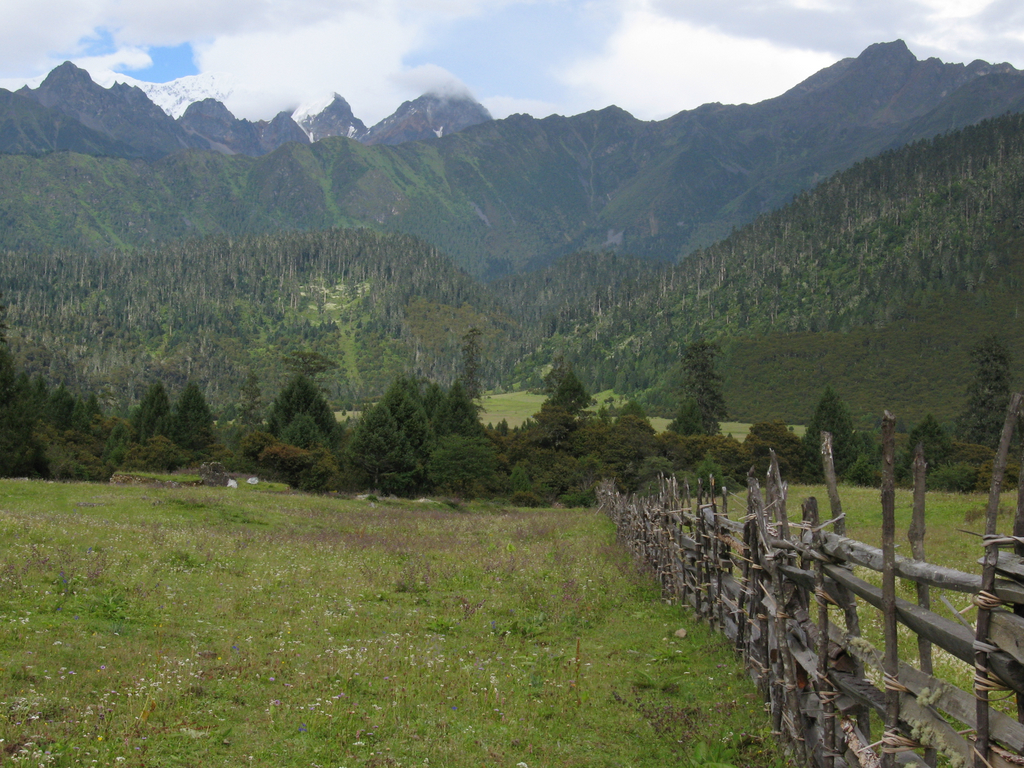

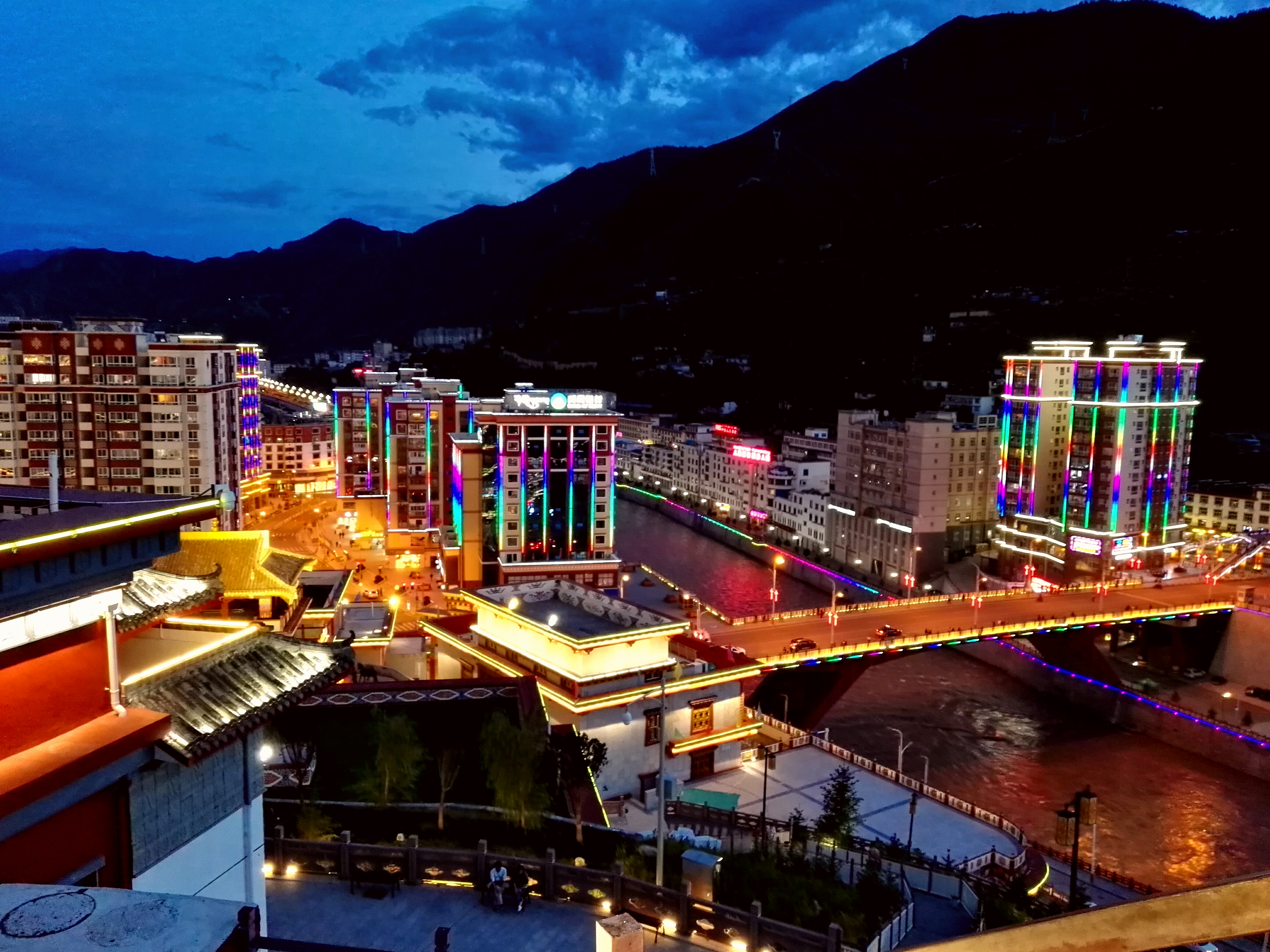

Karub administers 3 towns and 12 townships.

Name	Chinese	Hanyu Pinyin	Tibetan	Wylie	Population (2010)	Area (km^{2})
Towns
Chengguan Town	城关镇	Chéngguān Zhèn	ཁྲིན་ཀོན་གྲོང་རྡལ	khrin kon grong rdal	2	195.39
Guro Town	俄洛镇	Éluò Zhèn	འགུ་རོ་གྲོང་རྡལ	agu ro grong rdal	9	776.74
Karuo Town	卡若镇	Kǎruò Zhèn	མཁར་རོ་གྲོང་རྡལ	mkhar ro grong rdal	11	649.42
Townships
Mongda Township	芒达乡	Mángdá Xiāng	རྨོ་མདའ་ཤང	rmo mda' shang	8	440.24
Sagang Township	沙贡乡	Shāgòng Xiāng	ས་རྒང་ཤང	sa rgang shang	42	589.70
Ormaika Township	若巴乡	Ruòbā Xiāng	ཨོར་སྨད་ཁ་ཤང	or smad kha shang	1	897.33
Ngêxi Township	埃西乡	Āixī Xiāng	རྔེ་གཤེས་ཤང	rnge gshes shang	18	422.93
Ruxi Township	如意乡	Rúyì Xiāng	རུ་བཞི་ཤང	ru bzhi shang	4	329.80
Retong Township	日通乡	Rìtōng Xiāng	རེ་ཐོང་ཤང	re thong shang	0	546.76
Cêrwai Township	柴维乡	Cháiwéi Xiāng	ཚེར་དབད་ཤང	tsher dbad shang	–6	946.19
Toba Township	妥坝乡	Tuǒbà Xiāng	ཐོ་པ་ཤང	tho ba shang	3	1,769.10
Karma Township	嘎玛乡	Gāmǎ Xiāng	ཀ་རྨ་ཤང	ka rma shang	7	498.93
Mainda Township	面达乡	Miàndá Xiāng	སྨན་མདའ་ཤང	sman mda' shang	2.5	1,085.23
Yorba Township	约巴乡	Yuēbā Xiāng	ཡོར་པ་ཤང	yor pa shang	6	486.81
Latog Township	拉多乡	Lāduō Xiāng	ལྷ་ཐོག་ཤང	lha thog shang	13	1,728.35

== See also ==
- Chamdo
