= Karma Triyana Dharmachakra =

Tibetan Buddhist monastery in Woodstock, New York

Coordinates: 42°4′15″N 74°7′23″W

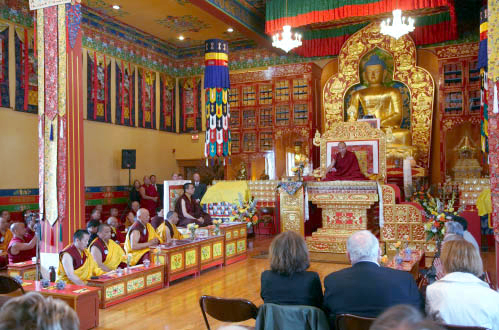
KTD Shrine Room with HH 17th Karmapa Ogyen Trinley Dorje enthroned

Karma Triyana Dharmachakra is a Tibetan Buddhist monastery in Woodstock, New York, United States, which serves as the North American seat of the 17th Gyalwa Karmapa, head of the Karma Kagyu lineage. It was founded in 1976 by the 16th Gyalwa Karmapa with Khenpo Karthar Rinpoche as abbot. He held this position until his death in 2019. The Third Bardor Tulku Rinpoche stayed in the United States to help Khenpo Karthar Rinpoche and Mr. Tenzin Chonyi establish and develop Karma Triyana Dharmachakra.
