= Pema Tönyö Nyinje =

Tibetan tulku (born 1954)

12th Tai Situ, Pema Tönyö Nyinje
- པདྨ་དོན་ཡོད་ཉིན་བྱེད
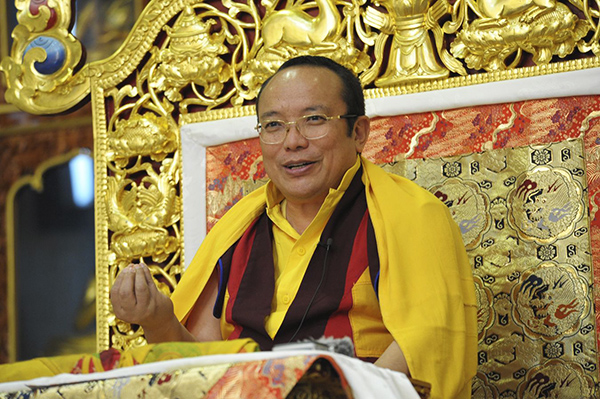
- The 12th Tai Situ in 2015

Personal life
- Born: 1954 (age 70–71); Derge, Tibet

Religious life
- Religion: Tibetan Buddhism
- Temple: Palpung Sherab Ling Monastery; Palpung Monastery
- School: Karma Kagyu

Senior posting
- Teacher: 16th Karmapa, Rangjung Rigpe Dorje
- Period in office: c. 1955–present

The 12th Tai Situ, Pema Dönyö Nyinje (Tibetan: པདྨ་དོན་ཡོད་ཉིན་བྱེད, Wylie: pad+ma don yod nyin byed) (born 1954) is the 12th Tai Situ, a tulku in Tibetan Buddhism, and one of the highest masters of the Karma Kagyu school. He is the head of Palpung Sherab Ling Monastery in India, and Palpung Monastery in Tibet.

== Life ==
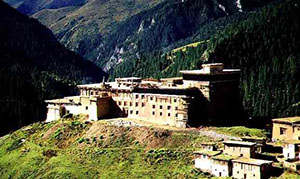
Palpung Monastery, Derge, Tibet Autonomous Region

Pema Tönyö Nyinje was born in 1954 in the village of Palmey, Palyul, Derge, Kham into a farming family named Liyultsang. He was enthroned at the age of 18 months as the 12th Tai Situ by Rangjung Rigpe Dorje, 16th Karmapa. At the age of five he was brought to Tsurphu Monastery. At the age of six he left Tibet for Bhutan, where King Jigme Dorji Wangchuck had been a disciple of the 11th Tai Situ. Later he was cared for at Rumtek Monastery in Sikkim, India, where he received his formal religious training from the 16th Karmapa.

The 16th Karmapa had been raised under the guidance of the 11th Tai Situ. The teacher-disciple relationship has served as a mechanism for the unbroken continuity within the Kagyu school. Chögyam Trungpa wrote in his book Born in Tibet: "Tai Situ Rinpoche, who was second in importance in the Karma Kagyu school, had died some years before and no reincarnation had been found. The Karmapa could now tell them where the incarnation had taken place. Everyone rejoiced and started immediately to make the preparations."

In 1974, at the age of 21, Pema Tönyö Nyinje went to Ladakh at the invitation from Druppon Dechen and stayed there for one year. In 1975, at the age of 22, he assumed his traditional responsibilities by founding Palpung Sherabling Monastery, at Baijnath, Himachal Pradesh, North India as his main seat in exile. In 2000, relics of the 8th Tai Situ were enthroned in a temple near the monastery.

== Activities ==
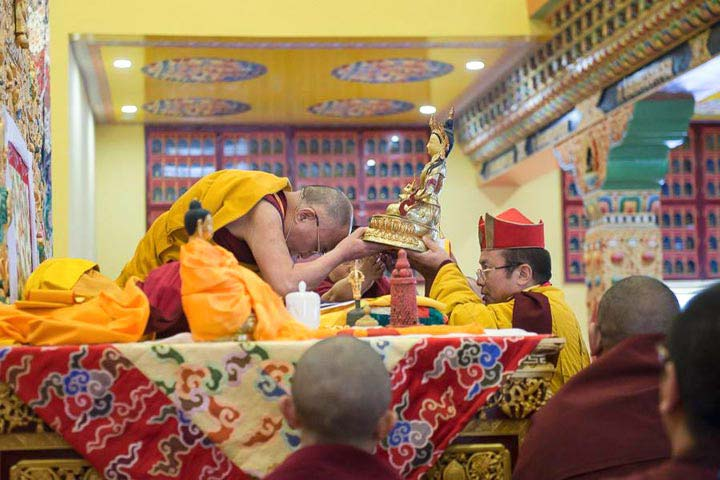
Historic visit of the 14th Dalai Lama to Palpung Sherabling Monastery, 11 and 12 May 2015. 12th Tai Situ offering a long-life empowerment to the Dalai Lama.

As a Buddhist teacher, the 12th Tai Situ traveled widely, making his first visit to the West in 1981 to Kagyu Samye Ling Monastery and Tibetan Centre in Scotland and visiting the United States in 1982. Since then, he has extensively traveled throughout North America, Europe and Southeast Asia. His teachings have since been published in nine English books. Further publications followed in the new millennium.

In 1989 Pema Tönyö Nyinje embarked on the Pilgrimage for Active Peace. Its 25 years' jubilee was celebrated in a two-day Peace Conclave that was held in Palpung Sherabling Monastery with guests and representatives from different World Religions.

Together with the 12th Goshir Gyaltshap Pema Tönyö Nyinje recognised Orgyen Trinley Dorje as the 17th Karmapa. He also recognized Choseng Trungpa, born on 6 February 1989 in Kham, as the reincarnation of Chögyam Trungpa.

On 21 February 2015, the Tai Situ opened Palpung Sherabling Monastery's newly built shedra, the Buddhist University for Higher Studies, Palpung Lungrig Jampal Ling, in a celebration. On 11 and 12 May 2015, the 14th Dalai Lama visited Palpung Sherabling Monastery in the presence of Jamgon Kongtrul, Khenchen Thrangu and representatives of all the Karma Kagyu monasteries in India, Nepal and Bhutan as well as representatives of the Sakya Trizin, Drikung Kyabgon, and Goshir Gyaltshab, in order to crown the completion of Palpung Sherabling Monastery having exactly the same departments and facilities as Palpung Monastery in Tibet Autonomous Region with the Ten Knowledges, a monastery with its monastic community, a Buddhist university, three-year retreats for both nuns and monks of the Marpa Kagyu and a Shangpa Kagyu retreat, as well as a reliquary temple. The Dalai Lama delivered a two-day teaching, preceded by a long-life empowerment and request for teachings offered by Tai Situpa.

== Karmapa controversy ==
During his lifetime, Tai Situ was a central figure in the current controversy within the Karma Kagyu lineage. He recognised Ogyen Trinley Dorje as the current (17th) Karmapa, as opposed to Trinley Thaye Dorje. Many high lamas within the lineage recognize Ogyen Trinley Dorje to be the current Karmapa, as does the 14th Dalai Lama and civil authorities in China.

== English books ==
- Way to go. Sowing the Seed of Buddha. 1985, ISBN 0-906181-04-6.
- Tilopa: Some Glimpses of His Life (1989)
- Relative World, Ultimate Mind (1992)
- Awakening the Sleeping Buddha (1996)
- Mahamudra Teachings (2002)
- Aspiration Prayer of Mahamudra (2002) with the third Karmapa
- Ground, Path and Fruition (2005)
- Praises and Prostrations to the Twenty-one Taras. Zhyisil Chokyi Ghatsal Trust, 2009, ISBN 978-1-877294-44-0.
- Nectar of Dharma: The Sacred Advice. Zhyisil Chokyi Ghatsal Trust, 2008, ISBN 1-877294-41-1 (volume one), ISBN 1-877294-42-X (volume two), ISBN 1-877294-43-8 (volume three).

== German books ==
- Letztendlich vollkommen sein. Palpung Europe, 2014. ISBN 978-3-200-03462-4.
- Grundlage, Pfad und Ergebnis. Palpung Europe, 2015. ISBN 978-3-200-03983-4.
- Gampopas Grundlegende Unterweisungen. Palpung Europe, 2017. ISBN 978-3-950-44290-8.
- Lobpreisungen und Huldigungen der 21 Taras. Palpung Europe, 2017. ISBN 978-3-950-44292-2.
- Den Pfad bereisen. Palpung Europe, 2017. ISBN 978-3-950-44291-5.
- Tilopa – Einblicke in sein Leben. Palpung Europe, 2017. ISBN 978-3-950-44293-9.
