= Tai Situpa =

Kagyu Tibetan Buddhist tulku lineage

Tai Situ (Tibetan: ཏའི་སི་ཏུ་, Wylie: ta'i si tu; from Chinese: 大司徒; pinyin: Dà Sītú; lit. 'Grand Administrator over the Masses') is one of the oldest lineages of tulkus (reincarnated lamas) in the Kagyu school of Tibetan Buddhism In Tibetan Buddhism tradition, Kenting Tai Situ is considered as emanation of Bodhisattva Maitreya and Guru Padmasambhava (Guru Rinpoche) and who has been incarnated numerous times as Indian and Tibetan yogis since the time of the historical Buddha.

== History ==
The Tai Situ is one of the highest-ranking reincarnate masters of the Karma Kagyu lineage. Chokyi Gyaltsen was the first to bear the title "Grand Situ" (Chinese: 大司徒; pinyin: Dà Sītú), conferred upon him in 1407 by the Yongle Emperor of Ming China. He was a close disciple of the 5th Karmapa, Deshin Shekpa, who appointed him Khenpo of Karma Goen, the Karmapa's principal monastery at the time. The full title bestowed was Kenting Naya Tang Nyontse Geshetse Tai Situ which can be abbreviated to Kenting Tai Situ. The full title means "far reaching, unshakable, great master, holder of the command".

The 9th Karmapa bestowed the 5th Kenting Tai Situ a Red Vajra Crown of Radiant Gold, which mirrored the Karmapa's own Black Vajra Crown. The Red Crown symbolizes the inseparability of the Karmapa and Kenting Tai Situ. Through seeing the Red Crown, which is presented in a ceremony even today by the Kenting Tai Situ, one is instantly and irreversibly set onto the path of enlightenment and receives the blessing of the Bodhisattva Maitreya.

The current 12th Tai Situ, Pema Tönyö Nyinje, was born in 1954 to a farming family named Liyul Tsang in the village of Palmey, which is in Palyul Wylie: dpal yul (Baiyü County, Sichuan, China) and part of the Kingdom of Derge. The Palpung Thupten Chokhor Ling Monastery in Derge was founded by the 8th Tai Situ, the Situ Panchen, in 1727 and presently all the Karma Kagyu Buddhist teachings are taught there to the monks. The monastery has preserved its traditional printing center for Buddhist teachings and for pechas.

At the age of twenty-two, the 12th Tai Situ founded another monastic seat, Palpung Sherab Ling Monastery, in Himachal Pradesh, India, where the monastery provides Tibetan Buddhist teachings including astronomy, Traditional Tibetan medicine, and it has a higher Tibetan Buddhist university Shedra program that teaches the Five Sciences. Alongside the classrooms for young monks and nuns, a sports facility for physical fitness, a traditional Tibetan herbal medicine garden, a medical clinic, an old age home, and accommodations for students are provided. Palpung Sherabling Monastery currently has approximately 1000 monks while 250 are enrolled in the Shedra monastic university curriculum on the premises. Palpung Yeshe Rabgyeling Nunnery has about 200 nuns and is located near the city of Manali. The Monastery also offers the traditional Kagyu three-year retreat for both monks and nuns on the compound. The Palpung sangha [10] consists of monasteries and temples in Tibet and China. The Palpung sangha also has branch institutions in Europe, USA, Canada, Oceania, and Asia.

The 12th Tai Situ traveled widely, making his first visit to the West in 1981 to Kagyu Samye Ling Monastery and Tibetan Centre in Scotland.

The 12th Tai Situpa was instrumental in recognizing Ogyen Trinley Dorje as the 17th Karmapa, based on a handwritten letter given to him by the 16th Karmapa before he died. This letter was accepted as authentic by all of the main Karma Kagyu heart-sons of the 16th Karmapa, including the 3rd Jamgon Kongtrul Rinpoche (with the one exception of the 14th Zhamarpa). The 17th Karmapa was enthroned in August 1992 by the 12th Tai Situ and the 12th Gyaltsab Rinpoche at Tsurphu Monastery, the traditional seat of the Karmapa outside Lhasa. Tai Situ also recognized Choseng Trungpa, born on 6 February 1989, in Chamdo County, Kham (Tibet Autonomous Region), as the 12th Zurmang Trungpa, Chokyi Sengye who is the reincarnation of Chögyam Trungpa.

== Lineage of Tai Situ Rinpoche ==
1. Chokyi Gyaltsen (1377–1448)
2. Tashi Namgyal (1450–1497)
3. Tashi Paljor (1498–1541)
4. Mitrug Gocha (1542–1585)
5. Chokyi Gyaltsen Gelek Palzang (1586–1657)
6. Mipham Trinlay Rabten (1658–1682)
7. Lekshe Mawe Nyima (1683–1698)
8. Situ Panchen (1700–1774)
9. Pema Nyingche Wangpo (1774–1853)
10. Pema Kunzang Chogyal (1854–1885)
11. Pema Wangchok Gyalpo (1886–1952)
12. Pema Tönyö Nyinje (1954- )
