= Nyingyor Monastery =

Tibetan Buddhist monastery in Golog, Qinghai, China

Nyingyor Monastery is a Tibetan Buddhist monastery of the Jonang and Gelug sect in the Golog Tibetan Autonomous Prefecture of Qinghai province, China. It is located in Nyingyor on the eastern bank of Shake River in Kangse Township, seven km south of Chorzhi County's Zhiqensomdor Township.

The monastery has a monk population of about 60, with some two sutra halls, three corridors and 75 monk quarters.
