= Dharma name =

New name acquired during Buddhist initiation and ordination rituals

Chinese name
- Traditional Chinese: 法名 法號 戒名 法諱
- Simplified Chinese: 法名 法号 戒名 法讳
Transcriptions
Standard Mandarin
- Hanyu Pinyin: fǎmíng fǎhào
Yue: Cantonese
- Jyutping: faat3 ming4 faat3 hou6

Burmese name
- Burmese: ဘွဲ့
- IPA: [bwɛ̰]

Vietnamese name
- Vietnamese alphabet: pháp danh
- Chữ Hán: 法名

Thai name
- Thai: ฉายา

Korean name
- Hangul: 법명
- Hanja: 法名
Transcriptions
- Revised Romanization: beommyeong
- McCune–Reischauer: pŏmmyŏng

Mongolian name
- Mongolian Cyrillic: номын нэр

Japanese name
- Kanji: 戒名
- Kana: かいみょう
Transcriptions
- Romanization: kaimyō

A Dharma name or Dhamma name is a new name acquired during both lay and monastic Buddhist initiation rituals in Mahayana Buddhism and monastic ordination in Theravada Buddhism (where it is more proper to call it the Sangha name). The name is traditionally given by a Buddhist monastic, and is given to newly ordained monks, nuns and laity. Dharma names are considered aspirational, not descriptive.

Most of the well-known Buddhist teachers are known to have had many different Dharma names in the course of their careers, and often each name represents a stage of their career. For example, Prince Shotoku was also known as Prince Umayado and Prince Kamitsumiya. Shinran's original name was Matsuwakamaru; he was also known as Hanen, Shakku, Zenshin, Gutoku Shinran and Kenshin Daeshi. Nichiren's original name was Zennichimaro and his original Dharma name was Zeshobo Rencho. Similarly, the tradition of various Dharma names was also used by Zen monks, who also used art to promote Buddhism. The famous monk-painter Hokusai was also known as Shunro, Kako, Sori, Taito, Iitsu, Gakyojin and Manji. Even the famous samurai Miyamoto Musashi had several names, including the Dharma name Niten Doraku and the birthname Miyamoto Masana. The Zen monk Thích Nhất Hạnh also has used various Dharma names in the course of his career.

If the student does not have a relationship with the monastic teacher and the ceremony is a public one with a congregation present, their new name will tend to reflect the lineage/tradition rather than the individual person. When it is given by a monastic who knows the disciple, however, the name is often tailor-made.

Dharma names are generally given in the language of the particular sangha where the name is bestowed.

== Naming practices by tradition ==
=== Burma (Myanmar) ===
In Burmese Buddhism, Dhamma names (bwe) are in Pali and chosen by the head monk of the monastery in which one is ordained. The traditional Burmese naming system, in which the monastic's day of birth stipulates the first letter of one's name, is used to select the name.

=== Sri Lanka ===
In Theravadan Buddhist tradition as practiced in Sri Lankan lineages the day of the week determines the first letter of the person's Dharma name, when a traditional naming methodology is followed. This is the system used by Bhante Gunaratana when giving Dharma names to his students at Bhavana Society of West Virginia.

=== China ===
In China, ordained monks and nuns automatically revert to using the surname "Shì" (釋) as in Shijiamouni (釋迦牟尼), the Chinese transliteration of Shakyamuni Buddha. Vietnam also follows this tradition for its monks and nuns by changing their surname to "Thích" as in Thích Ca Mâu Ni, the Sino-Vietnamese name for Shakyamuni. Likewise for the Sino-Mahayana tradition of Buddhism, the Dharma name given upon ordination can reflect the lineage passed from the teacher to the student, this can result in being given several Dharma names: one for usage publicly, one used especially to reflect the transmitted lineage, and a second Dharma name that can also be used.

In the Shaolin Temple, each subsequent generation takes the first part of their given name from a 70-character poem written by Xueting Fuyu. For example, the 32nd character in the poem is "xíng" (行), and all Shaolin Temple monks and disciples of that generation take a name starting with Shi Xing.

In some Chinese Pureland sects such as that of Master Renshan and Master Chin Kung it is traditional for persons who do not have the ability to acquire a Dharma name from a teacher to use the Dharma name "Miao-Yin", until a teacher can give them a personally chosen name. It is common among Pureland sects for all lay members to have either the same last name, such as "Jia" in the case of Master Renshan's disciples, or the same first name, such as "Jing" in the case of Shandao lineage practitioners.

=== Japan ===
In Japan, other than the standard usage of Dharma names for monastics and laity, it is also tradition for the deceased to receive a Dharma name (戒名, kaimyō; lit. 'precept name') written in kanji from the priest. This name supposedly prevents the return of the deceased if his name is called. The length of the name depends also on either the virtue of the person's lifespan, or more commonly, the size of the donation of the relatives to the temple, which may range from a generally common name to the most elaborate names for 1 million yen or more. The high prices charged by the temples are a controversial issue in Japan, especially since some temples put pressure on families to buy a more expensive name.

Some Jōdo Shinshū sources draw a distinction between 戒名 (kaimyō, precept name) and 法名 (hōmyō, Dharma name), preferring the latter for theological reasons. Other sources consider these terms to be interchangeable. Jōdo Shinshū hōmyō consist of three or four kanji, prefixed by Shaku for men and Shaku-ni for women and followed by two ideographs, one selected by the student and one by the teacher.

The composition of the Dharma name varies, although generally it must be composed of characters found in the Buddhist sutras. Specific schools and temples will sometimes have additional conventions: for example, names from Ji-Shu temples in Ippen are typically a single syllable suffixed with 阿 (a, short for 阿弥陀仏, Amitābha Buddha), and names from the Bright Dawn Center of Oneness Buddhism can be one or two ideographs suffixed with 陽 (yō which means sun and relates to Rev. Koyō Kubose).

In the Sanbo Kyodan tradition, the names usually consist of three ideographs: a unique kanji, followed by 雲 (un, cloud) and ending with either the suffix 庵 (-an) for women or 軒 (-ken) for men.

=== Tibet ===
In Tibetan Vajrayana Buddhist tradition one is first given a Refuge name at the Triple Refuge ceremony, then a Bodhisattva name upon taking the vows of a Bodhisattva, then a secret Samaya name upon receiving certain Tantric rites. People in the Karma Kagyu tradition of Tibetan Buddhism are often given the first name Karma, followed by a second name. Those in the Drikung Kagyu sect often receive the first name Konchog, and then an additional name. This makes it easy to identify the person's Dharma lineage. Khentrul Jamphel Lodrö Rinpoche generally uses the initial letter of a person's birth name in selecting a Shambala lineage name for the practitioner.

== See also ==
- Ajahn
- Awgatha
- Ayya (Pali word)
- Bhante
- Five precepts
- Religious name
- Sayadaw
- Tisarana
