= Ocean of Definitive Meaning =

Ocean of Definitive Meaning: A Teaching for the Mountain Hermit (Wylie: ri chos nges don rgya mtsho), written in the first half of the 14th century, is considered the magnum opus of Dolpopa Sherab Gyaltsen (1292–1361). The Ocean of Definitive Meaning is a hermeneutical text on the issue of the doctrine of the Three Turnings of the Wheel of Dharma that was first codified in the Sandhinirmocana Sutra.

The Ocean of Definitive Meaning conveys a specific reading, understanding and interpretation of śūnyatā and Buddha-nature, of the second and third turnings of the wheel respectively. Both Śūnyatā and Tathāgata-garbha are central and key principles of Mahayana Buddhism. This specific reading of Śūnyatā and Tathāgata-garbha and the philosophical view behind it, became known as shentong, the key tenet of the Jonang school. Dölpopa's thought in this work is a hermeneutics of the Mahayana Buddhist texts and develops teachings of Maitreya and Yogacara masters Asanga (4th century) and his brother Vasubandhu (4th century).

For 150 years prior to the sacking of the Jonang monasteries by the Gelugpa in the 17th century, the Ocean of Definitive Meaning was banned within the grounds of Gelug monasteries.

== English translations ==
Jeffrey Hopkins (translator) and Kevin Vose (editor) rendered the Ocean of Definitive Meaning into English as Mountain Doctrine, published by Snow Lion, Ithaca in 2006 .

Ives Waldo published an electronic version of Ocean of Definitive Meaning, freely available here.

A third English rendering of The Ocean of Definitive Meaning entitled Mountain Dharma: An Ocean of Definitive Meaning is numbered volume seven of The Library of Tibetan Classics, a thirty-two volume series covering Tibet's classical literary heritage, published by Wisdom Publications.

== Influence ==
The influence of Dölpopa's shentong view extends beyond the Jonang school and is discernible in the writings of:

- Serdok Penchen Sakya Chokden (Wylie: gser mdog pan chen sa kya mchog ldan, 1428–1507) of the Sakya;
- Mikyö Dorje, 8th Karmapa Lama (1507–1554) of the Kagyu;
- Kunkhyen Pema Karpo (1527–92) of the Kagyu;
- Taranatha (1575–1634) the historian;
- Jamgon Kongtrul (fl. 19th century) Rimé movement master;
- Jamgon Ju Mipham Gyatso (1846–1912), the Nyingma master.

== See also ==
- Mindstream
- Six yogas
- Ösel (yoga)
