= Yumo Mikyo Dorje =

Yumo Mikyö Dorjé (Tibetan: ཡུ་མོ་མི་བསྐྱོད་རྡོ་རྗེ་, Wylie: yu mo mi bskyod rdo rje) was a student of the Kashmiri scholar Somanātha and an 11th-century Kalachakra master. Yumo Mikyö Dorjé is regarded as one of the earliest Tibetan articulators of a shentong view of śūnyatā — an understanding of the absolute radiant nature of reality. Emphasized within the Kalachakra tantra and Gautama Buddha's teachings on Buddha-nature in the so-called Third Turning of the Wheel of the Dharma of the Yogacara school of Buddhism philosophy; this view later became emblematic of the Jonang tradition of Tibetan Buddhism.
