= Sandhinirmocana Sutra =

Sutra in Mahāyāna Buddhism

The Ārya-saṃdhi-nirmocana-sūtra (Sanskrit) or Noble Sūtra of the Explanation of the Profound Secrets is a Mahāyāna Buddhist text and the most important sutra of the Yogācāra school. It contains explanations of key Yogācāra concepts such as the basal-consciousness (ālayavijñāna), the doctrine of appearance-only (vijñaptimātra) and the "three own natures" (trisvabhāva). Étienne Lamotte considered this sutra "the link between the Prajñāpāramitā literature and the Yogācāra Vijñānavāda school".

This sūtra was translated from Sanskrit into Chinese four times, the most complete and reliable of which is typically considered to be that of Xuanzang. It also was translated into Tibetan. The original Sanskrit text has not survived to the present day.

== Nomenclature and etymology ==
The Ārya-saṃdhi-nirmocana-sūtra (traditional Chinese: 解深密經; ; pinyin: Jiě Shēnmì Jīng; Tibetan: དགོངས་པ་ངེས་འགྲེལ༏, Wylie: dgongs pa nges 'grel Gongpa Ngédrel) is variously romanized as Sandhinirmocana Sutra and Samdhinirmocana Sutra. The full Sanskrit title includes "Ārya" which means noble or excellent.

The title has been variously translated as:

- Unlocking the Mysteries (Cleary)
- Explanation of the Profound Secrets (Keenan)
- Elucidation of the Intention Sutra or Unravelling the Thought (Powers)
- The Explication of Mysteries, L'explication des mystères (Lamotte)
- Sutra which Decisively Reveals the Intention

== History ==
Like many early Mahāyāna sūtras, precise dating for the Saṃdhinirmocana Sūtra is difficult to achieve. Étienne Lamotte believed that the text was assembled from earlier, independent fragments. Other scholars believe that the apparently fragmentary nature of the early versions of the scripture may represent piecemeal attempts at translation, rather than a composite origin for the text itself. The earliest forms of the text may date from as early as the 1st or 2nd Century CE. The final form of the text was probably assembled no earlier than the 3rd Century CE, and by the 4th Century significant commentaries on the text began to be composed by Buddhist scholars, most notably Asaṅga.

== Content ==
The Saṃdhinirmocana Sūtra is one of the most important texts of the Yogācāra tradition, and one of the earliest texts to expound the philosophy of Consciousness-only. The sūtra presents itself as a series of dialogues between Gautama Buddha and various bodhisattvas. During these dialogues, the Buddha attempts to clarify disputed meanings present in scriptures of the early Mahāyāna and the early Buddhist schools; thus, the title of the sūtra, which promises to expound a teaching that is "completely explicit" and requires no interpretation in order to be understood.

The sūtra is divided into various chapters or sections which vary depending on the translation, the Tibetan version translated by Powers has ten, Xuanzang's Chinese version (trans. Keenan) has eight chapters. The analysis below is based on Xuanzang's version (Taisho Tripitaka Volume 16, Number 676). The first chapter is an introduction and sets the setting, which is a immeasurable and brilliant celestial palace filled with innumerable beings and bodhisattvas.

=== Chapter 2: The Descriptive Marks of the Truth of Ultimate Meaning ===
The second chapter focuses on the nature of the "ultimate meaning" (paramārtha) and how it is said to be "ineffable" and non-dual. This ultimate meaning cannot be seen through concepts and language, since all things are empty of any inherent essence (svabhāva) and words and ideas are provisional. Thus, while ultimate reality is beyond language, "apart from all names and words", noble awakened beings "provisionally invent" linguistic conventions such as "conditioned" and "unconditioned" in order to lead sentient beings to the truth. However these inventions have no absolute existence, they are like the creations of a magician, which only appear to be dualistic, but actually lead to a non-dual transcendent reality. This ultimate meaning is described by the Buddha as follows:

The sphere that is internally realized without descriptions cannot be spoken and severs expressions. Ultimate meaning, laying to rest all disputes, transcends all the descriptive marks of reasoning.

Furthermore, the Buddha states in this chapter that "it is not reasonable to say that the descriptive marks of the truth of ultimate meaning are identical with the descriptive marks of conditioned states of being, nor that they are entirely different one from the other." Rather, ultimate meaning transcends both of these characterizations. The Buddha also states that "only it is eternal and permanent," and also this ultimate meaning "is of one universal taste," is undifferentiated and is present in all compounded things.

=== Chapter 3: The Descriptive Marks of Mind, Thought, and Consciousness ===
Chapter three discusses the ālayavijñāna (store consciousness), also called the appropriating consciousness (ādānavijñāna), or receptacle consciousness, and how it is related to perception and thought. The ālayavijñāna is the "support and ground" for the existence of sentient beings in the various realms. It appropriates the body, images and words, and out of it evolve the various sense consciousnesses (including the mind consciousness, manas).

The Buddha emphasizes however that these processes are dependent on conditions and are thus not ultimately real. Indeed, it is because bodhisattvas do not see any of these consciousnesses as real that they are said to be skilled in the ultimate meaning. Thus, the Buddha states:

The appropriating consciousness is profound and subtle indeed; all its seeds are like a rushing torrent. Fearing that they would imagine and cling to it as to a self, I have not revealed it to the foolish.

=== Chapter 4: The Characteristic Patterns of All Things ===
Chapter four explains the schema of the "three natures" (trisvabhāva): the imagined, the other-dependent and the fully perfected. These are described as follows:

The pattern of clinging to what is entirely imagined refers to the establishing of names and symbols for all things and the distinguishing of their essences, whereby they come to be expressed in language. The pattern of other-dependency refers to the pattern whereby all things arise co-dependently: for if this exists, then that exists, and if this arises, then that arises. This refers to [the twelvefold conditions, starting with] 'conditioned by ignorance are karmic formations,' [and ending with] 'conditioned by origination is this grand mass of suffering,' [the last of the twelve conditions]. The pattern of full perfection refers to the universally equal suchness of all things. Bodhisattvas penetrate to this suchness because of their resolute zeal, intelligent focusing, and true reflection. By gradually cultivating this penetration, they reach unsurpassed true awakening and actually realize perfection.

As Keenan notes, "the basic interdependent (paratantra) nature of consciousness is explained as evolving toward illusory verbal imagining (parikalpita), but yet capable of being converted (āśraya-parivṛtti) to the full perfection of awakening (pariniṣpanna)."

=== Chapter 5: The Absence of Essence ===
Chapter Five begins with the bodhisattva Paramārthasamudgata, who asks what the Buddha's "implicit intent" is when he taught two kinds of doctrine: doctrines which explain reality by describing it analytically (such as through the schemas of dependent origination, the four noble truths, and the realms of existence), and also those doctrines which state that "all things have no-essence, no arising, no passing away, are originally quiescent, and are essentially in cessation." In answering this question, the Buddha applies his schema of the three natures to understand the nature of absence of essence. The Buddha states there are three ways in which things are said to have no essence:

I have explained that all things whatsoever have no-essence, for descriptive marks have no-essence, arising has no-essence, and ultimate meaning has no-essence. Good son, descriptive marks have no-essence, for all things are characterized by imaginative clinging. This is so because it is names and symbols that establish those marks, and there is no inherent characteristic in things. This then is what I call the no-essence of marks. The arising of things has no-essence, for all things arise in dependence upon others. This is so because they depend upon the causal power of others and do not arise from themselves. Therefore this is what I call the no-essence of arising. The ultimate truth of all things has no-essence, for, from their arising, all things have no-essence. This is what I call the no-essence that is identical with the conditioned arising of things. I also call it the no-essence of ultimate meaning because I preach that among all things, that realm of the purified content of understanding is to be regarded as the no-essence of ultimate meaning.

Thus, these "three no-essences" are said to correspond to the three natures:

- The imagined nature (parikalpita-svabhāva) has no essence in regards to its characteristics (lakṣana-niḥsvabhāvatā), for these characteristics are just imaginary.
- The dependent nature (paratantra-svabhāva) has no essence because all phenomena arise and perish due to conditions (utpatti-niḥsvabhāvatā).
- The perfected nature (pariniṣpanna-svabhāva) is essenceless since even when consciousness has been fully purified, it has no essence. Since ultimate reality is dependently originated, the ultimate meaning is also essencelessness (paramārtha-niḥsvabhāvatā).

The Buddha then explains that understanding this teaching is important because "sentient beings superimpose the pattern of imaginative clinging over that of other-dependency and full perfection", and this leads to rebirth and wandering in saṃsāra. However, by attending to this teaching and giving rise to "a wisdom not permeated by language," sentient beings are able to destroy this pattern of imaginative clinging. Those beings that do not understand this teaching however might instead cling to the "view of nihilism and the nonexistence of all marks," and so they "negate all three characteristic patterns."

This chapter also provides the hermeneutical schema of the Three Turnings of the Wheel of Dharma. This is intended to clarify confusing or contradictory elements of earlier teachings by presenting a new teaching that resolves earlier inconsistencies by uniting all previous doctrines. The Sūtra affirms that the earlier "turnings of the wheel of Dharma"—the teachings of the Śrāvaka Vehicle (Śrāvakayāna) and the emptiness (śūnyatā) doctrine found in the Prajñaparamita sutras—are authentic, but require interpretation if they are not to contradict each other.

Thus, the Buddha states that there is an "underlying intent" to these two teachings, which is only explicitly revealed in the Saṃdhinirmocana. That underlying intent is the three natures and the three no-essences. This explicit meaning is said to "pervade all scriptures of implicit meaning with its identical, single hue, and thus demonstrates the implicit meaning of those scriptures." Thus while the teachings of the other two turnings require interpretation, the third turning "was the most marvelous and wonderful that had ever occurred in the world. It had no superior nor did it contain any implicit meaning nor occasion any controversy."

=== Chapter 6: The Analysis of Yoga ===
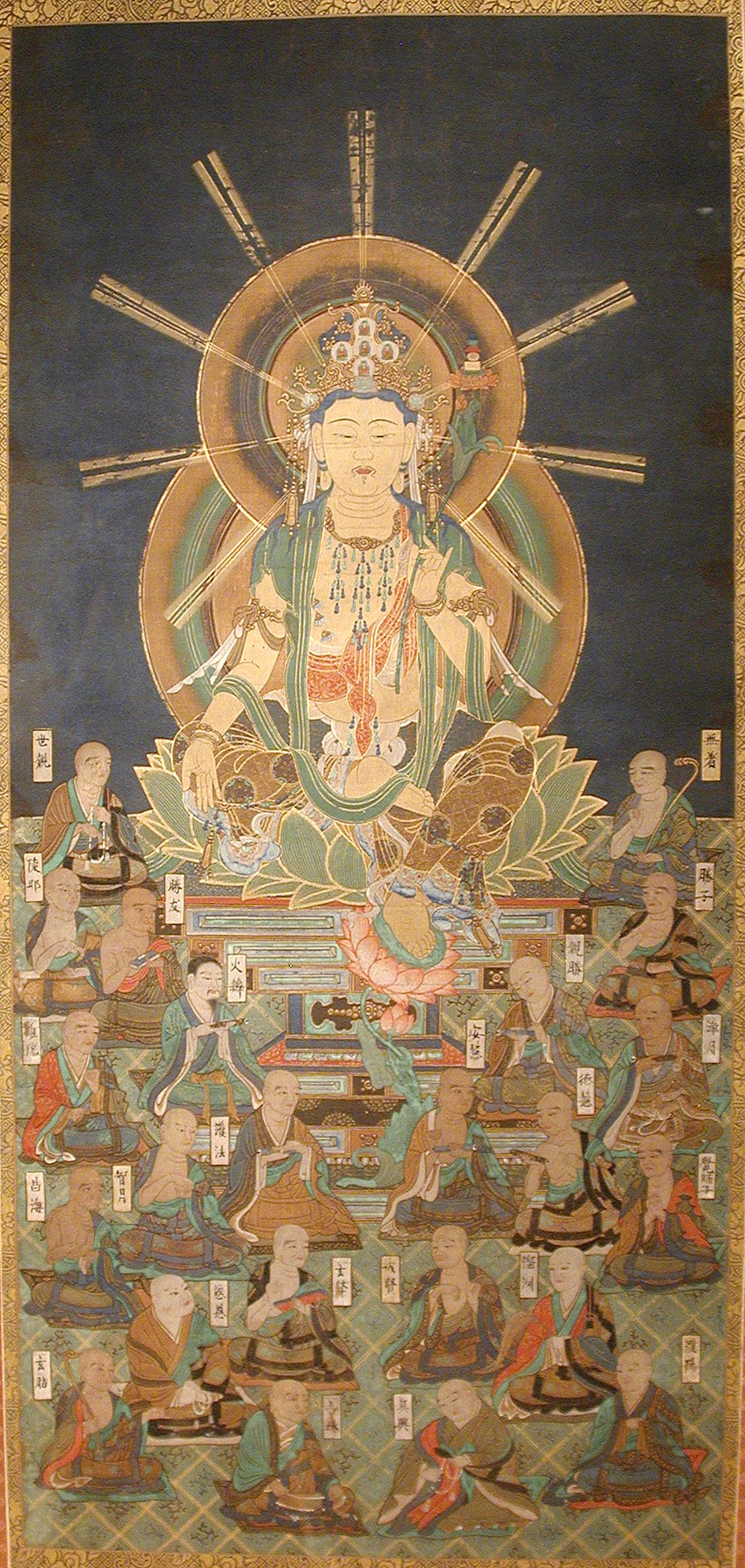
16th century Japanese hanging scroll of bodhisattva Maitreya, who appears in the sixth chapter

Chapter Six explains yoga and śamatha-vipaśyanā meditations from the Yogācāra perspective. In this chapter, the Buddha teaches Maitreya that a bodhisattva's support for meditation is "the conventional exposition of the doctrine and the commitment not to cast off full, supreme awakening." Śamatha according to this sutra is the continuous focusing of the mind, while vipaśyanā is the understanding of the true nature of things, which refers to the suchness (tathatā) and emptiness explained in the previous chapters. Through meditation, one is able to eradicate the mental afflictions and gain insight into ultimate reality.

In śamatha-vipaśyanā meditation, bodhisattvas focus on four kinds of support (ālambana):

- The savikalpam pratibimbam (reflected images conceptually imagined),
- The nirvikalpam pratibimbam (reflected images free from any conceptual imagination),
- The vastuparyantatā (ultimate reality being realized in toto),
- The kāryapariniṣpatti (perfection of supernatural acts of bodhisattvas and Buddhas).

This chapter also contains the teaching that all things are vijñaptimātra. The Buddha states that "I have taught that the object of consciousness is nothing but a manifestation of conscious construction only." This is something which is to be realized in meditation. Once one reaches oneness of mind (cittaikāgratā), one is able to see that reflected images only appear to be outside the mind, but like images in a mirror, are actually conscious constructions.

This chapter also explains how the meditation of a bodhisattva is different from that of śrāvakas because bodhisattvas practice "the quietude and vision that take as their object a great unified doctrine." This meditation refers to how bodhisattvas take as the object of their understanding all the doctrines of the sutras as "one accumulation, one whole, one gathering up, all in harmony with suchness, turning toward suchness, approaching suchness." The Buddha then explains the different ways that bodhisattvas know the doctrine and the meaning of the doctrine. He also explains the seven types of suchness that bodhisattvas reflect on:

The first is the suchness of the transmigratory flow, for all conditioned states of being have neither beginning nor end. The second is the suchness of descriptive marks, for in all things both persons and things have no-self. The third is the suchness of conscious construction, for all conditioned states of being are nothing but conscious construction. The fourth is the suchness of what is given, that is, the truth about suffering that I have preached. The fifth is the suchness of false conduct, that is, the truth about the origin [of suffering] that I have preached. The sixth is the suchness of purification, that is, the truth of the destruction [of suffering] that I have preached. And the seventh is the suchness of correct practice, that is, the truth of the path that I have preached.

The Buddha is then asked by Maitreya how one cultivates meditation by abandoning various mental images (or 'signs'). The Buddha explains that when one reflects on "true suchness", one abandons "images of doctrine and images of meaning," since true suchness has no image. He also states that if one has an uncultivated mind "one will not sustain a true understanding of suchness."

Furthermore, mental cultivation entails the letting go of ten progressively subtler "difficult to abandon" images (nimittas) which are abandoned through different meditations on emptiness:

- The "various images of writings and words, which they are able to abandon through [cultivating meditation on] the emptiness of all doctrine (sarva-dharma-śūnyatā)".
- "Images of arising, passing away, abiding, differentiation, continuity, and development, which is abandoned by meditating on the emptiness of characteristics (lakṣana-śūnyatā) and the emptiness of beginnings and endings (anavarāgra-śūnyatā).
- "Lustful images of bodies and of self-pride" or "conceiving the bodily sub-consciousness as real and thinking 'I am'", which are abandoned through meditation on the emptiness of interior [states] (adhyatma-śūnyatā) and the emptiness of non-attainment. (anupalambha-śūnyatā)"
- "Images of desired possessions" or "experienced objects", abandoned through meditation on the "emptiness of externals" (bahirdhā-śūnyatā).
- The images of "internal happiness and external pleasure" are abandoned through meditating on "the emptiness of the internal and the external (bahirdhādhyātma-śūnyatā), and on innate emptiness (prakṛti-śūnyatā)."
- Images of their environments, "which they are able to abandon through [cultivating meditation on] the greatness of emptiness" (mahā-śūnyatā).
- "Because they discern and know the immaterial, they have images of internal quiescence and liberation, which they are able to abandon through [cultivating meditation on] the emptiness of the conditioned (saṃskṛta-śūnyatā)".
- "Because they discern and know the meaning of the true suchness of images, they have images of the no-self of persons and things, which, whether images of only conscious construction or of ultimate meaning, they are able to abandon through [cultivating meditation on] the emptiness of the ultimate (atyanta-śūnyatā), the emptiness of no-essence (abhāva-śūnyatā), the emptiness of the essence of no-essence (abhāvasvabhāva-śūnyatā), and the emptiness of ultimate meaning (paramārtha-śūnyatā)."
- "Because they discern and know the meaning of the suchness of purification, they have images of the unconditioned and of the unchanging, which they are able to abandon through [cultivating meditation on] the emptiness of the unconditioned (asaṃskṛta-śūnyatā) and the emptiness of the unchanging" (anavakāra-śūnyatā).
- "Because they attentively reflect upon the nature of emptiness whereby they discipline what has to be disciplined, they have images of the nature of emptiness, which they are able to abandon through [cultivating meditation on] the emptiness of emptiness" (śūnyatā-śūnyatā).

The Buddha also states that in the practice of meditation, bodhisattvas "gradually refine their thoughts as one refines gold until they realize supreme awakening."

The Buddha further explains that there is an "overall image of emptiness" which the bodhisattvas do not discard, this is:

"the final separation of those images clung to by imagination, with all their varieties of defilement and purity, from both the pattern of other-dependency and the pattern of full perfection: [i.e.,] the complete nonattainment [of such imagined things] in those [patterns of consciousness]."

The Buddha also notes that the cause of the practice of calm and insight meditation is said to be "purified discipline and true insight accomplished through purified hearing and reflection."

=== Chapter 7: The Stages and Perfections ===
Chapter Seven describes the progressive "bodhisattva stages"(bhūmis) and the perfections or transcendent practices (pāramitās). The path stages and the pāramitās are presented as progressive steps on the path to awakening, each one being a key advance in wisdom and spiritual attainment. The six pāramitās for example as described as follows:

Good son, [the former] are the support that enables one to produce the latter. This means that bodhisattvas are able to acquire purified discipline through being generous with their physical possessions [through giving]. They practice patience because they guard discipline. By practicing patience, they become capable of producing zeal. By producing zeal, they become capable of accomplishing meditation. Endowed with meditation, they become able to obtain transcendent discernment. This, then, is the reason for the sequence of the six perfections in my preaching.

The six pāramitās are explained as each having three components :

The three subdivisions of giving are the giving of doctrine, the giving of material goods, and the giving of fearlessness. The three subdivisions of discipline are the discipline to turn away from what is not good, the discipline to turn toward what is good, and the discipline to turn toward benefiting sentient beings. The three subdivisions of patience are the patience to endure insult and injury, the patience to abide peacefully in suffering, and the patience to investigate doctrine. The three subdivisions of zeal are the zeal which protects one like armor, the zeal to exert effort in engendering good, and the zeal to exert effort in benefiting sentient beings. The three subdivisions of meditation are the meditation of abiding in happiness, which counteracts all the suffering of passion because it is non-discriminative, tranquil, very tranquil, and irreproachable; the meditation that engenders the good quality [of concentration]; and the meditation that produces benefit for sentient beings. The three subdivisions of discernment are the discernment that has as its object worldly, conventional truth; the discernment that has as its object the truth of ultimate meaning; and the discernment that has as its object the benefiting of sentient beings.

This chapter also affirms the doctrine of "one vehicle" (ekayāna) which holds that "the vehicle of the śrāvakas and Mahāyāna vehicle are but a single vehicle."

=== Chapter 8: The Duty Accomplishment of a Tathāgata ===
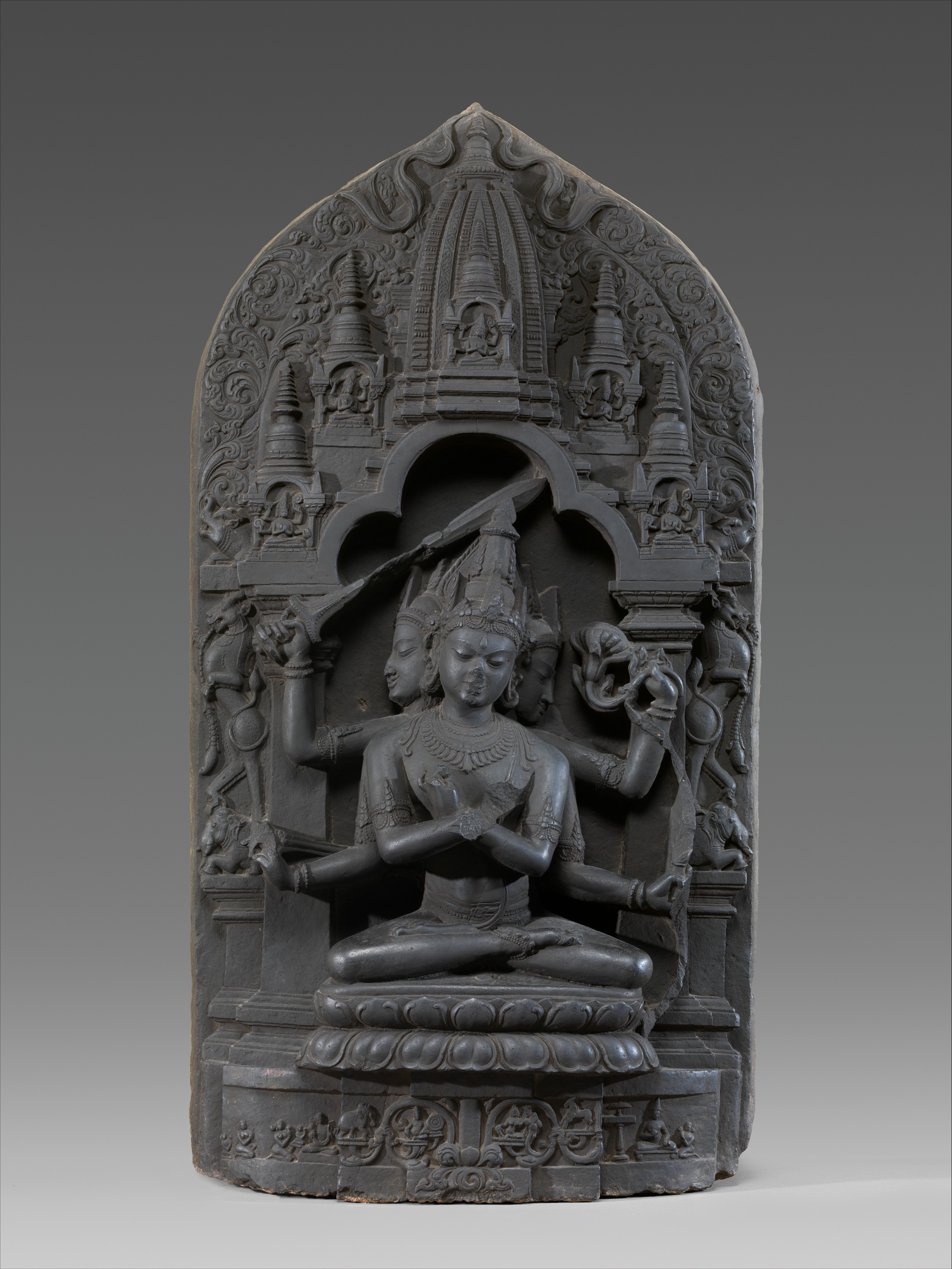
Manjushri bodhisattva sculpture (black stone), Bangladesh or India (Bengal), 11th century.

The final chapter explains the wisdom and activity of Buddhahood, which is the culmination of the development of compassion and wisdom. It also explains the meaning of the sutras, vinaya and matṛkas. In this chapter, the Buddha explains to Mañjuśrī that a Buddha's limitless compassionate actions are done without any manifest activity. It is thus said that "the Dharma body of all Tathāgatas is apart from all effort."

The chapter also explains the doctrine of the three bodies of the Buddha (Trikāya). It also explains the nature of relative and ultimate truth as well as the various ways of reasoning. The nature of a Buddha's omniscience is also explained.

== Commentaries ==
The Saṃdhinirmocana Sūtra was adopted by the Yogācāra as one of its primary scriptures. In addition, it inspired a great deal of additional writing, including discussions by Asaṅga, Vasubandhu, Xuanzang, Woncheuk (Traditional Chinese: 圓測), and a large body of Tibetan literature founded on Je Tsongkhapa's writings concerning the scripture.

There are two commentaries on this sutra attributed to Asaṅga, the Compendium of Ascertainments (Viniscaya-samgrahani) and the Commentary on the Āryasaṃdhinirmocana (Āryasaṃdhinirmocana-bhasya).

There is another extant commentary, attributed to Jñānagarbha which is only on the eighth chapter of the sutra, the Maitreya chapter, titled the "Āryasaṃdhinirmocana-sutre-arya-maitreya-kevala-parivarta-bhasya".

There is also a large Chinese commentary by Woncheuk, a Korean student of Xuanzang which cites many sources with differing opinions. Large sections of the original Chinese have been lost, and the only complete edition that survives is in the Tibetan canon. According to Powers, "The text is a masterpiece of traditional Buddhist scholarship that draws upon a vast range of Buddhist literature, cites many different opinions, raises important points about the thought of the Sūtra, and provides explanations of virtually every technical term and phrase."

In the Tibetan tradition, there is a Tibetan commentary attributed to Byang chub rdzu 'phrul, most Tibetan scholars hold that this refers to Cog-ro Klu'i-rgyal-mtshan (Chokro Lüi Gyaltsen, 8th century). Another influential commentary which mentions this sutra (and others considered part of the third turning) is Dolpopa's Ocean of Definitive Meaning (ri chos nges don rgya mtsho) There is also the Legs-bshad-snying-po by Tsongkhapa, which focuses on the seventh chapter, and its commentary by dPal-'byor-lhun-grub.

== Translations ==
- Chen, Naichen (2023), The Sutra of Explaining the Profound Secret: An English Version of the Chinese Jie Shen Mi Jing Rendered from Sanskrit by Master Xuanzang, Tucson: Wheatmark, ISBN 9798887470276
- Cleary, Thomas (1995), Buddhist Yoga : A Comprehensive Course, Boston: Shambhala, ISBN 1570620180
- Keenan, John (2000), Scripture on the Explication of the Underlying Meaning, Berkeley: Numata Center, ISBN 1886439109
- Lamotte, Etienne (1935), Samdhinirmocana Sutra: L'explication des Mystères, Paris: Adrien Maisonneuve
- Powers, John (1995), Wisdom of Buddha : The Samdhinirmochana Sutra, Berkeley: Dharma Publishing, ISBN 089800246X
- Frauwallner, Erich (1969), Die Philosophie des Buddhismus, pp.284-295 (partial translation, chapters VI and VII), Frankfurt: Akademie Verlag
- Tillemans, Tom J.F. (1997). "On a Recent Translation of the Samdhinirmocanasutra". Journal of the International Association of Buddhist Studies. 20 (1): 153–164. Archived from the original on February 2, 2014. (Review: Powers)

== Commentaries ==
- Anderson, Reb (2012). The Third Turning of the Wheel: Wisdom of the Samdhinirmocana Sutra. Berkeley: Rodmell Press. ISBN 978-1930485310. OCLC 757477313..
- Powers, John (1992). Two Commentaries on the Samdhinirmocana-Sutra by Asanga and Jñānagarbha. Lewiston, NY: The Edwin Mellen Press. ISBN 0-7734-9477-4.

== See also ==
- East Asian Yogācāra
- Svatantrika
- Ocean of Definitive Meaning
- Tibetan Buddhism
- Mahayana sutras

== Works cited ==
- Powers, John (2004), "Sandhinirmocana-Sūtra", in Buswell, Robert E. Jr. (ed.), Macmillan Encyclopedia of Buddhism, USA: Macmillan Reference USA, pp. 737–738, ISBN 0-02-865910-4
- Williams, Paul (2004), Mahayana Buddhism, Bury St. Edmunds, England: Routledge, pp. 78–81, ISBN 0-415-02537-0
