= Khentrul Jamphel Lodrö Rinpoche =

Tibetan Buddhist Rimé Master

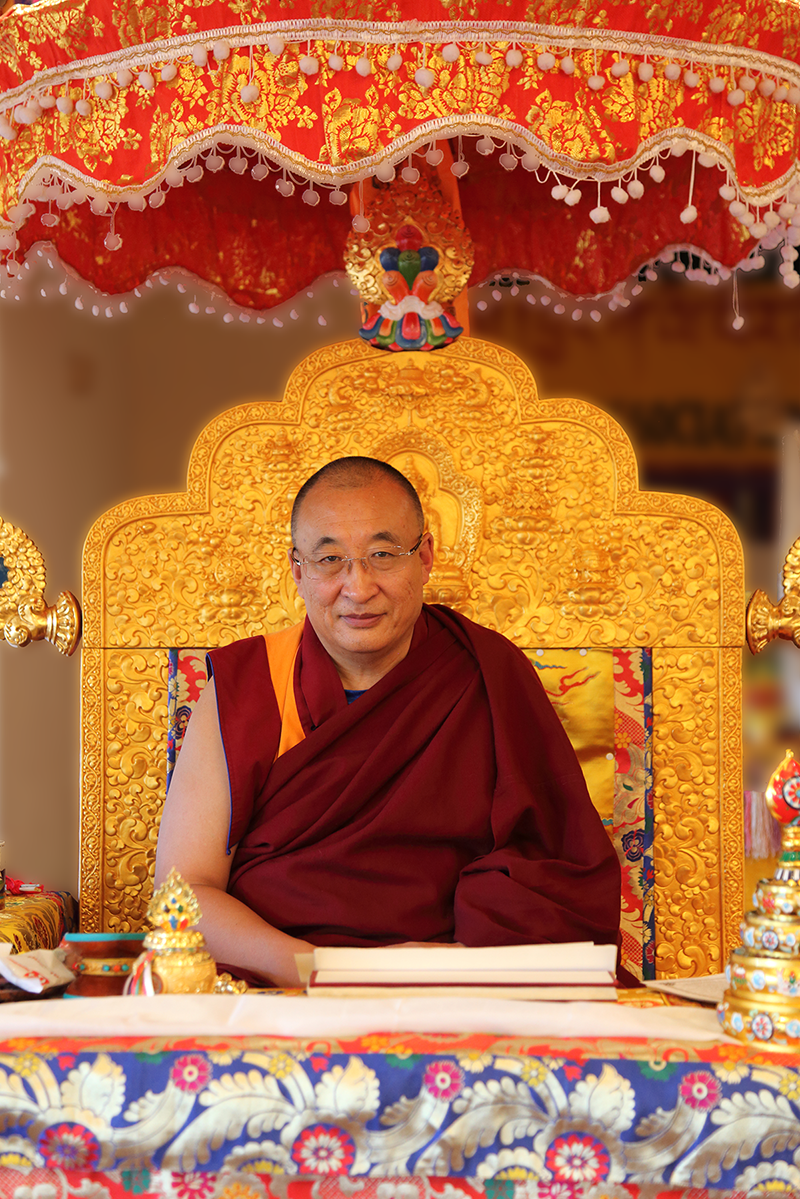
- Khentrul Rinpoche in 2018
- Title: Rinpoche

Religious life
- Religion: Buddhism
- School: Jonang Rimé
- Lineage: Jonang
- Dharma name: Shar Khentrul Jamphel Lodrö Rinpoche

Senior posting
- Reincarnation: Ngawang Chözin Gyatso

Military service
- Website: khentrulrinpoche.com

Khentrul Jamphel Lodrö Rinpoché (Tibetan: ཤར་མཁན་སྤྲུལ་འཇམ་དཔལ་བློ་གྲོས།, Wylie: shar mkhan sprul 'jam dpal blo gros) (born 1968) is a Tibetan Buddhist Rimé Master. Shar Khentrul Jamphel Lodro Rinpoché teaches predominantly the extensive Kalachakra system according to the Jonang tradition of Tibetan Buddhism. He is the founder and spiritual director of the Tibetan Buddhist Rimé Institute or Tong Zuk Dechen Ling in the Tibetan language. He translated the Jonang Kalachakra practice texts, with instructions, into English and Chinese.

== Background ==
Khentrul Rinpoché Jamphel Lodro was born in the Golok Region of Eastern Tibet. Nowadays, he is based in Australia, where the Rimé Institute is also located. Khentrul Rinpoché travels all over the world to teach Kalachakra. Furthermore, he founded Dzokden, an international community for Kalachakra practitioners that advocates for world peace from a Jonang perspective and Kalachakra in particular. He was recognized as the reincarnation of the great Kalachakra Yogi Ngawang Chözin Gyatso. In 2017, Khentrul Rinpoché unveiled a completely accurate statue of the 24 Armed Kalachakra deity to help generate the causes for world peace.

== Rimé Master ==
Even though Khentrul Rinpoché is part of the Jonang school, he has trained with more than 25 teachers from all major Tibetan Buddhist traditions. Through this path, he earned the title of Rimé Master in 1997, a title which was officially recognized by the Dalai Lama in 2013. He styles himself as non-sectarian (meaning he does not differentiate between different sects) and is thus part of the Tibetan Rimé movement . At the core of his teachings is the recognition that there is great value in the diversity of traditions found in this world. However, his work is mostly based within a Tibetan Buddhist context.

== Books ==
- Shar Khentrul Rinpoché (2013). A Secret Incarnation Reflections of a Tibetan Lama. Tibetan Buddhist Rimé Institute. ISBN 978-81-76856-40-9.
- Shar Khentrul Rinpoché (2015). A Happier Life: How to develop genuine happiness and well being during every stage of your life. Tibetan Buddhist Rimé Institute. ISBN 978-0-9944453-2-2.
- Shar Khentrul Rinpoché (2015). Oceans of Diversity: An unbiased summary of views and practices, gradually emerging from the teachings of the world's wisdom traditions. Tibetan Buddhist Rimé Institute. ISBN 978-0-9944453-0-8.
- Shar Khentrul Rinpoché (2016). Demystifying Shambhala. Tibetan Buddhist Rimé Institute. ISBN 978-0-9944453-7-7.
- Shar Khentrul Rinpoché (2016). Hidden Treasure of the Profound Path: A Word-by-Word Commentary on the Kalachakra Preliminary Practices. Tibetan Buddhist Rimé Institute. ISBN 978-0-9946106-90.
- Shar Khentrul Rinpoché (2016). Unveiling Your Sacred Truth through the Kalachakra Path, Book One: The External Reality. Tibetan Buddhist Rimé Institute. ISBN 978-0-9944453-4-6.
- Shar Khentrul Rinpoché (2016). Unveiling Your Sacred Truth through the Kalachakra Path, Book Two: The Internal Reality. Tibetan Buddhist Rimé Institute. ISBN 978-0-9946106-38.
- Shar Khentrul Rinpoché (2016). Unveiling Your Sacred Truth through the Kalachakra Path, Book Three: The Enlightened Reality. Tibetan Buddhist Rimé Institute. ISBN 978-0-9946106-69.
- Shar Khentrul Rinpoché (2021). The Realm of Shambhala: A Complete Vision for Humanity's Perfection. Shambhala Publications. ISBN 978-1611808032.
- Shar Khentrul Rinpoché (2023). Tantric Path of Desire: Bringing Passion to the Spiritual Path. Dzokden. ISBN 978-1-958229-76-7.

== See also ==
- Rimé movement
- Kalachakra
- Jonang
