= Jonang =

School of Tibetan Buddhism

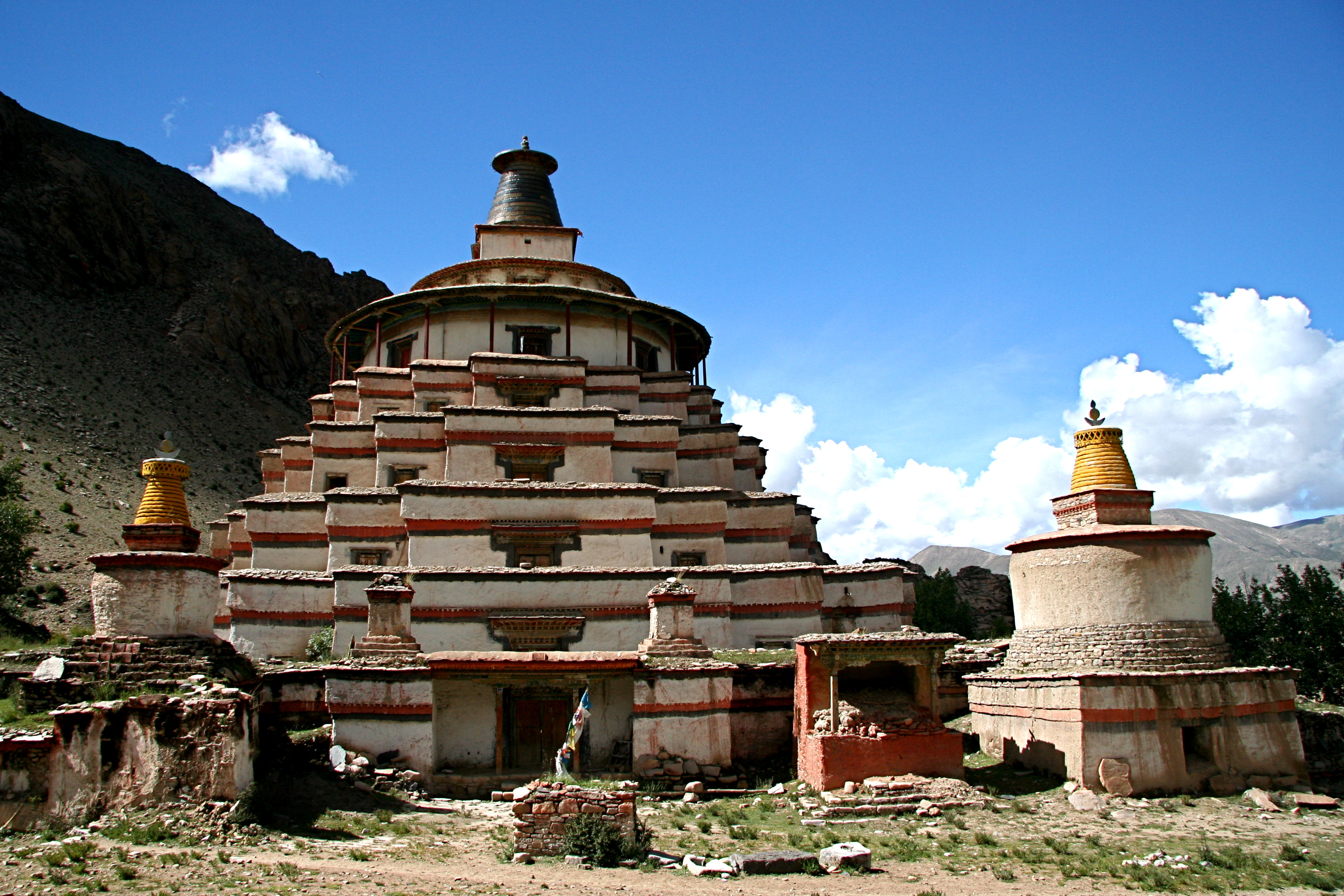
Dolpopa's Great Stupa at Jomonang, Tibet

The Jonang (Tibetan: ཇོ་ནང་, Wylie: Jo-nang) is a school of Indo-Tibetan Buddhism. Its origins in Tibet can be traced to the early 12th century master Yumo Mikyo Dorje. It became widely known through the work of the popular 14th century figure Dolpopa Sherab Gyaltsen. The Jonang school's main practice is the Kālacakra tantra (Wheel of Time Tantra), and they are widely known for their defense of the philosophy known as shentong ("empty of other").

After a period of influence, the Jonang tradition suffered a series of reversals, partly due to its suppression by the politically dominant Gelug school under the Fifth Dalai Lama in the 17th century. Jonang did survive in Amdo, from which they eventually re-established themselves in other regions like Golok, Nakhi, and Kham. They have continued practicing uninterrupted to this day. An estimated 5,000 monks and nuns of the Jonang tradition practice today in these areas. However, their teachings were limited to these regions until the Rimé movement of the 19th century encouraged the study of non-Gelug traditions of Tibetan Buddhism.

The Jonang shentong view was influential on various figures in other Tibetan Buddhist schools, including the 3rd Karmapa Rangjung Dorje (1284–1339), the eighth Tai Situpa (1700–1774), Katok Tsewang Norbu (1698–1755), Situ Panchen (1700–1774), Jamgön Kongtrül (1813–1899), Kalu Rinpoche (1905–1989), and Khenpo Tsultrim Gyamtso (1934–2024).

== History ==
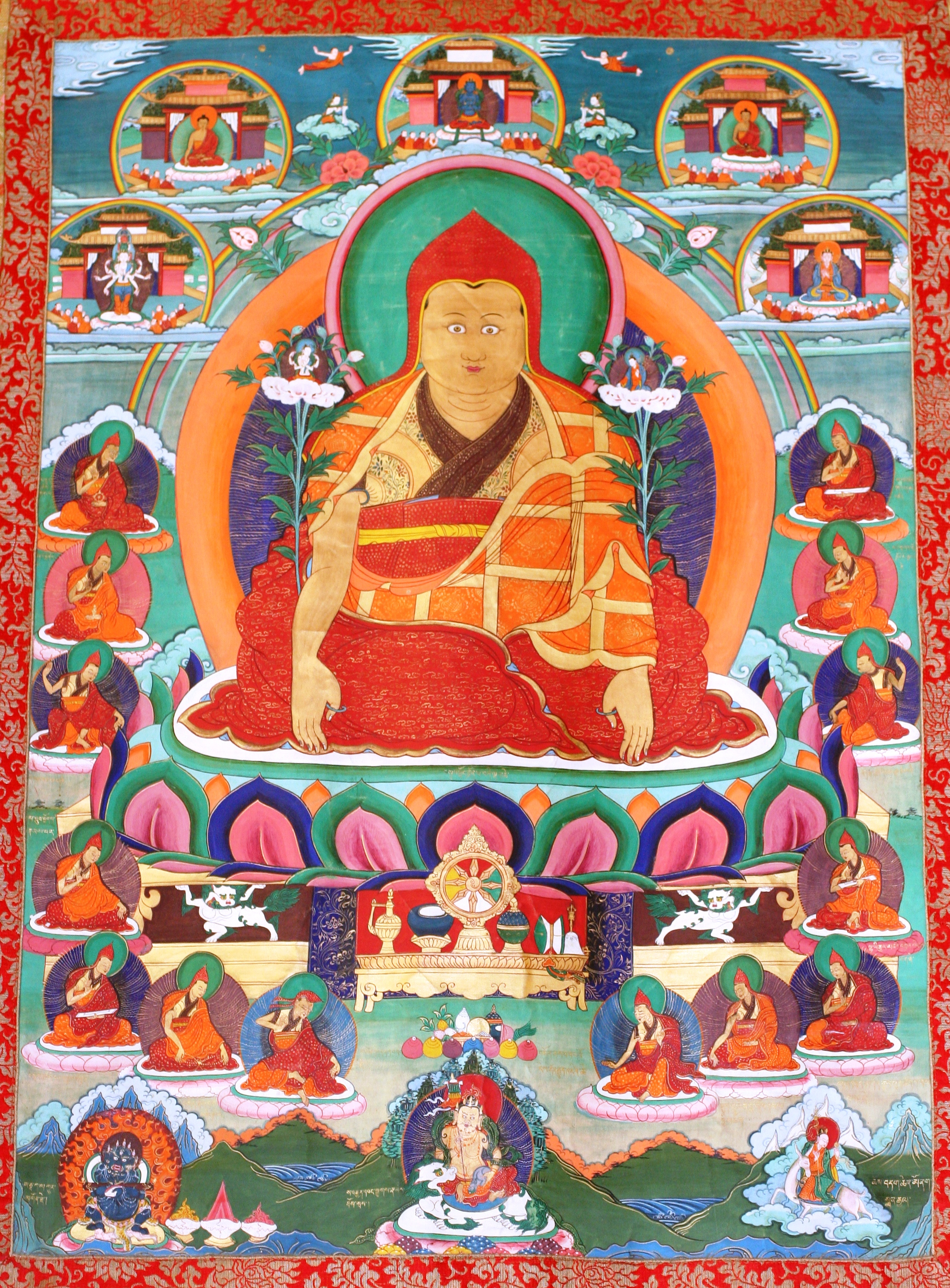
Thangkha of Dolpopa Sherab Gyaltsen

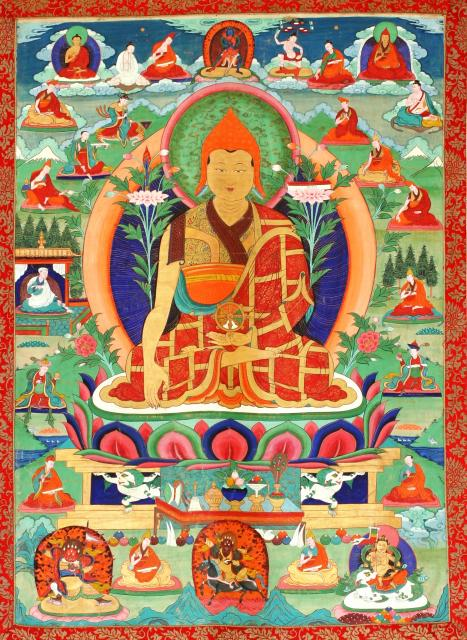
Tāranātha

=== Development ===
The monk Künpang Tukjé Tsöndrü (Wylie: kun spangs thugs rje brtson 'grus, 1243–1313) established a kumbum or stupa-vihara in the Jomonang Valley about 160 kilometres (99 mi) northwest of the Tashilhunpo Monastery in Ü-Tsang (modern Shigatse). The Jonang tradition took its name from this "Jomonang" monastery, where Tsöndrü established a practice tradition that integrated seventeen different transmission of the Kālacakra Tantra completion stage yogas, and which was significantly expanded by later figures, including Dolpopa.

The Jonang tradition combines two specific teachings, what has come to be known as the philosophy of shentong ("empty of other") madhyamaka, and the Dro lineage of the Kalachakra Tantra. The origin of this combination in Tibet is traced to the master Yumo Mikyö Dorjé (c. 11th-12th century), a pupil of the Kashmiri master Somanātha, whose treatises compiled sources emphasizing the unique approach to emptiness of the Kalachakra Tantra.

The shentong view holds that the non-dual nature of the mind (the buddha-nature) is real (and not empty of inherent existence), while all other phenomena are empty in this way. The buddha-nature can be described empty, but not of its own-nature, rather it is empty of all defiled and illusory phenomena. Thus, in Jonang, the emptiness of ultimate reality should not be characterized in the same way as the emptiness of relative phenomena. This is because ultimate reality is a stream of luminosity (prabhāsvara-saṃtāna), endowed with limitless Buddha qualities. It is empty of all that is false, not empty of the limitless Buddha qualities that are its innate nature.

The key figure in Jonang is Dolpopa Sherab Gyaltsen (1292–1361), a great yogi and scholar who widely promoted the philosophy of shentong. He was initially educated at Sakya monastery, and he also studied Kagyu and Nyingma lineages. He was very impressed by the yogis of Jonang Monastery and eventually studied there under Khetsun Yonten Gyatso (1260–1327), receiving a complete transmission of the Jonang Kālacakra tradition. After some years in meditative retreat, Dolpopa assumed the leadership of Jonang monastery. Over the years, Dolpopa became extremely popular and was invited to teach throughout Tibet. He wrote various influential works on the shentong philosophy.

=== Post-Dolpopa era and suppression ===
After Dolpopa's time, the Jonang school generated a number of renowned Buddhist scholars, its most famous being Lama Tāranātha (1575–1634), who placed great emphasis on the Kālacakra Tantra, Sanskrit study and the history of Indian Buddhism. Tāranātha studied under various figures, such as Je Draktopa, Yeshe Wangpo, Kunga Tashi and Jampa Lhundrup, but his main teacher was the mahāsiddha Buddhaguptanātha. In the 17th century, the Gelug school became the dominant political force in Tibet, which was now ruled by the Dalai Lamas. The Gelug school worked to suppress the Jonang school and its distinct philosophy of shentong. Modern historians have identified two other reasons which more likely led the Gelugpa to suppress the Jonangpa. First, the Jonangpa had political ties that were very vexing to the Gelugpa. The Jonang school, along with the Kagyu, were historical allies with the powerful house of Tsangpa, which was vying with the 5th Dalai Lama and the Gelug school for control of Central Tibet.

This was bad enough, but soon after the death of Taranatha, an even more ominous event occurred. Taranatha's tulku was discovered to be a young boy named Zanabazar, the son of Tüsheet Khan, Prince of Central Khalkha. Tüsheet Khan and his son were of Borjigin lineage (the imperial clan of Genghis Khan and his successors), meaning they had the birth authority to become khagan. When the young boy was declared the spiritual leader of all of Mongolia, suddenly the Gelugpa were faced with the possibility of war with the former military superpower of Asia. While the Mongol Empire was long past its zenith, this was nonetheless a frightening prospect and the Dalai Lama sought the first possible moment of Mongol distraction to take control of the Jonang monasteries.

As a result of the suppression of Jonang, the writings of Dolpopa Sherab Gyaltsen and even those of Sakya proponents of shentong (like Sakya Chokden) were sealed and banned from publication and study. Jonang monasteries were also gradually converted to the Gelug lineage by the political authorities.

The 14th Dalai Lama has also said that the main reason for the suppression of Jonang was political, not religious sectarianism (since the 5th Dalai Lama was himself a student of numerous lineages, including Bon).

=== Survival and revival ===
The Jonang tradition was able to survive in Amdo where a couple of monasteries had been founded in 'Dzam thang and rGyal rong. From here Jonang was able to spread to other regions like Golog and Ngawa. Dzamtang Tsangwa dzong (in Zamtang County, Sichuan), established by Ngag dbang bstan 'dzin rnam rgyal (1691–1728), eventually became the school's main seat. Due to the efforts of figures like Ngag dbang blo gros grags pa (1920–1975) and Ngag dbang yon tan bzang po (1928–2002), about fifty Jonang monasteries survived the cultural revolution.

The Jonang school also experienced a revival in the modern era during the Rime period. Important modern Jonang scholars include Bamda Gelek Gyatso (1844–1904), Tsoknyi Gyatso (1880–1940), Ngawang Lodro Drakpa (1920–75), Kunga Tukje Palsang (1925–2000) and Ngawang Yonten Sangpo (1928–2002). Modern Jonang figures also had close relationships with masters of the non-sectarian (Rime) movement such as Jamgon Kongtrul (1813–1899) and Patrul Rinpoche (1808–1887) and these Rime figures also visited and studied at Dzamtang.

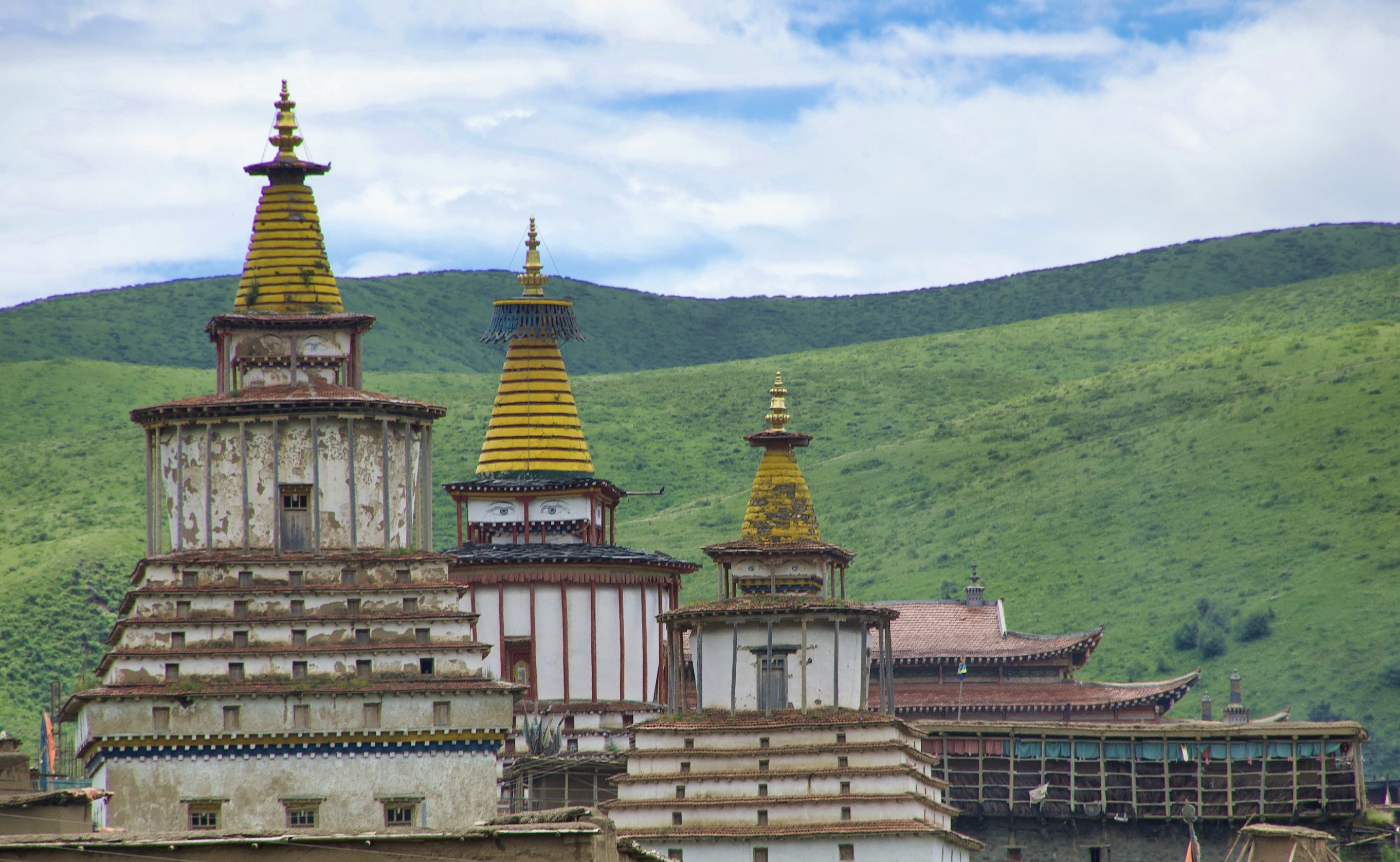
Dzamthang Tsangwa Monastery in Sichuan. The major monastic seat of the Jonang tradition today in Amdo.

Until recently little was known about the survival of Jonang until Tibetologists discovered around 40 monasteries, with around 5000 monks, including some in the Amdo Tibetan and rGyalgrong areas of Qinghai, Sichuan and Tibet.

One of the primary supporters of the Jonang lineage in exile has been the 14th Dalai Lama. The Dalai Lama donated buildings in Himachal Pradesh state in Shimla, India for use as a Jonang monastery (now known as the Main Takten Phuntsok Choeling Monastery) and has visited during one of his recent teaching tours. The Karmapa of the Karma Kagyu lineage has also visited.

The Jonang tradition has been actively petitioning for the past 20+ years to the Tibetan Government in exile, requesting them to recognize the Jonang as the sixth living Buddhist tradition of Tibetan Buddhism, and seek equal religious rights and representation to the Bon, Nyingma, Sakya, Kagyu and Gelug. The 14th Dalai Lama assigned Jebtsundamba Khutuktu of Mongolia (who is considered by the Gelug tradition to be an incarnation of Tāranātha) as the leader of the Jonang tradition.

More recently, the Jonang school has been growing in the West (led by teachers like Khentrul Jamphel Lodrö Rinpoché and Khenpo Chokyi Nangwa) and among the Chinese (led by teachers like Tulku Jamyang Lodrö and mKhan po Chos kyi dbang phyug).

== Texts ==
Much of the Tibetan literature of the Jonang has survived, including the Ocean of Definitive Meaning: A Teaching for the Mountain Hermit (commonly referred to as Mountain Dharma), an extensive presentation of the ground, path, and fruit from the shentong perspective by Dolpopa.

=== Mahayana sutras of definitive meaning ===
==== Tathagatagarbha sutras ====
According to Dolpopa, his main sources for the ultimate truth and definitive meaning (nītārtha) are the tathagatagarbha sutras, the most important of which are the following:

- Tathāgatagarbha Sūtra (Sutra on the Tathagata Essence, Tib. De bzhin gshegs pa'i snying po'i mdo)
- Avikalpapraveśadhāraṇī (Dharani for Entering the Nonconceptual; Tib. Rnam par mi rtog pa la 'jug pa'i gzungs)
- Śrīmālādevī Siṃhanāda Sūtra (Sutra of the Lions Roar of Srimaladevi)
- Mahābherīsūtra (Sutra of the Great Drum)
- Aṅgulimālīya Sūtra (Sutra to Benefit Angulimala)
- Śūnyatānāmamahāsūtra (Sutra of Great Emptiness)
- Tathāgatamahākaruṇānirdeśasūtra (Sutra Presenting the Great Compassion of the Tathagata), also known as the Dhāraṇīśvararājasūtra
- Tathāgataguṇajñānācintyaviṣayāvatāranirdeśasūtra (Sutra Presenting the Inconceivable Qualities and Primordial Awareness of the Tathagata)
- Mahāmeghasūtra (Extensive Sutra of the Great Cloud)
- Mahāyāna Mahāparinirvāṇa Sūtra (Sutra of Great Final Nirvana), which exists in two Tibetan versions, a condensed and an extensive version.

==== Sutras of Definite Meaning ====
Another Jonang list of sutras of definitive meaning, i.e. which teach the ultimate truth, not the relative or provisional meaning (neyārtha) for the Jonang traditions is the following:

- Pañcaśatikā-prajñāpāramitā Sūtra (Perfection of Wisdom in 500 Lines)
- the "Maitreya Chapter" ("Maitreya's Questions" is a chapter found in two versions of the Tibetan Large Prajñaparamita sutra, the 18,000 line and the 25,000 line versions.)
- Ghanavyūha Sūtra ("Dense Array Sutra")
- Praśāntaviniścayaprātihāryanāmasamādhisūtra (Sutra on Utterly Quiescent and Certain Magical Meditative Concentrations)
- Ratnameghasūtra (Clouds of Jewels Sutra)
- Suvarṇaprabhāsottamasūtra (Golden Light Sutra)
- Saṃdhinirmocanasūtra (Explanation of the Profound Secrets Sutra)
- Laṅkāvatāra Sūtra (Descent into Laṅka Sutra)
- Sarvabuddha-viṣayāvatāra-jñānālokālaṃkāra Sūtra
- Buddhāvataṃsakasūtra

=== Tantric sources ===
The most important Buddhist tantra in the Jonang tradition is the Kālacakra tantra.

Regarding tantric commentaries, Jonang relies on The Bodhisattva Trilogy (sems 'grel skor gsum), which comprises the following three texts: The Vimalaprabhā (an 11th-century Indian commentary on the Kalacakra tantra), the Hevajrapiṇḍārthaṭīkā (Toh 1180, a commentary on the Hevajra tantra in 6000 lines), and the Laksabhidhanaduddhrtalaghutantrapindarthavivarana (Toh 1402), a commentary on the Chakrasamvara tantra by Vajrapani.

=== Key śāstras ===
The Jonang tradition also relies on several important Indian and Tibetan śāstras (treatises), including:

- The works of Nagarjuna, especially his Mūlamadhyamakakārikā
- The Five Maitreya Texts: Abhisamayalankara, Mahayanasutralankara, Ratnagotravibhāga, Dharmadharmatavibhanga, Madhyantavibhanga
- The works of Dolpopa, especially his Ocean of Definitive Meaning: A Teaching for the Mountain Hermit (Wylie: ri chos nges don rgya mtsho) and his Great Calculation of the Doctrine that have the Significance of a Fourth Council. His A General Explanation of Buddha's Teaching was his first work on the view of "Empty of Other," elucidating the core meaning of Buddhism.
- The works of Taranatha, especially his The Essence of Other-Emptiness, Meaningful to Behold (Mthong ba don ldan) and his Commentary on the Heart Sutra.
