= Dolpopa Sherab Gyaltsen =

Tibetan Buddhist master known as "The Buddha from Dölpo

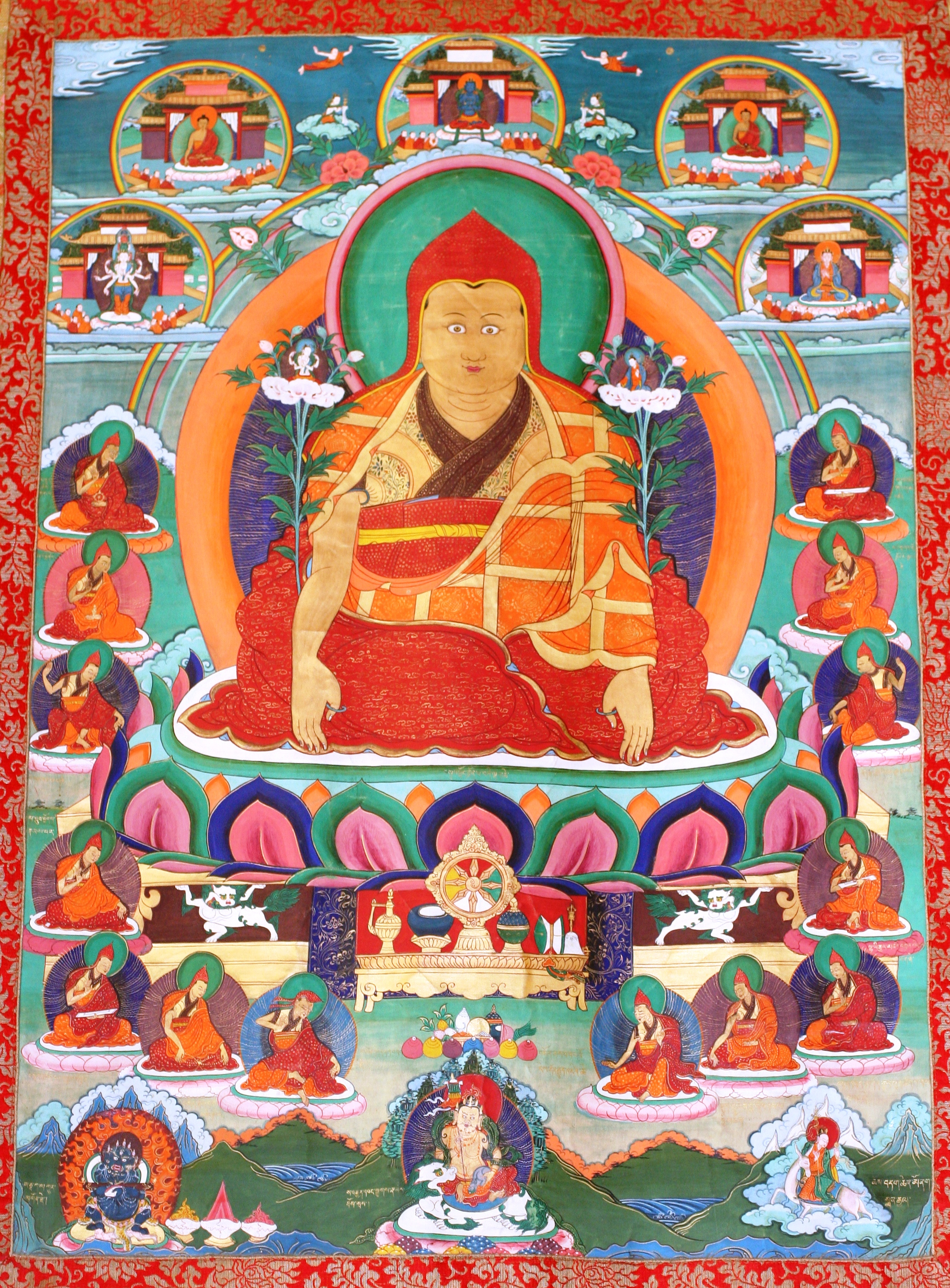
Thangkha with Jonang lama Dolpopa Sherab Gyaltsen (1292–1361)

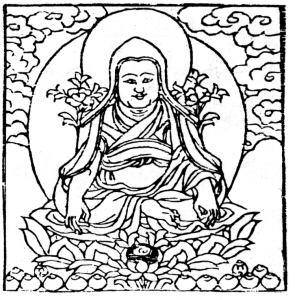
Dölpopa Shérap Gyeltsen

Dölpopa Shérap Gyeltsen (Tibetan: དོལ་པོ་པ་ཤེས་རབ་རྒྱལ་མཚན་, Wylie: dol po pa shes rab rgyal mtshan) (1292–1361), known simply as Dölpopa, was a Tibetan Buddhist master. Known as "The Buddha from Dölpo," a region in modern Nepal, he was the principal exponent of the shentong teachings, and an influential member of the Jonang tradition of Tibetan Buddhism.

== Biography ==
Dölpopa was born in Dölpo in present-day Nepal. In 1309, when he was seventeen, he ran away from home to seek the Buddhist teachings, first in Mustang and then in Tibet. In 1314, when he was twenty-two years old, Dölpopa received full monastic ordination from the famous abbot of Choelung Monastery, Sönam Trakpa (1273–1352), and made a vow at the time to never eat slaughtered meat again.

In 1321, Dölpopa visited Jonang Monastery at Jomonang (which was later destroyed during the Cultural Revolution) for the first time. He then visited Tsurphu Monastery for the first time and had extensive discussions with Rangjung Dorje, 3rd Karmapa Lama, about doctrinal issues. It appears that the Karmapa Lama almost certainly influenced the development of some of Dölpopa's theories, possibly including shentong. Other than this, Dölpopa had studied almost completely under the Sakya tradition until he was thirty years old in 1322 and he had taught for most of the previous decade at the great Sakya Monastery.

In 1327, after the death of his guru Yönden Gyantso, Dölpopa decided to fulfill a prayer he had made at the great stupa at Trophu (Khro phu) to repay his master's kindness. "He also felt that the stūpa would become an object of worship for people who were not fortunate enough to engage in study, contemplation, and meditation, and therefore provide them with the opportunity to accumulate virtue."

In time, Dölpopa became one of the most influential and original yet controversial of Tibetan Buddhist teachers, systemizing Buddha-nature and Yogacara-Madhyamaka teachings in teaching known as shentong (Wylie: gzhan stong).

Dölpopa retired from the leadership of Jonang Monastery in 1338 and appointed the translator lotsawa Lödro Bal to succeed him. Lödro Bal remained in this role for seventeen years.

== Teachings ==
According to Stearns,

It is important to keep in mind that Dölpopa was a consummate practitioner of the Six-branch Yoga, the perfection-stage practices of the Kālacakra tantra, and although he based his doctrinal discussions upon scripture, in particular the Kālacakra-related cycles, his own experience in meditation was crucial to the formulation of his theories.

According to John Newman, "[T]he Kālacakra tantra presupposes a developmental model [of buddhahood], in opposition to the revelatory model interpretation of the Kālacakra promoted by Dol po pa Shes rab rgyal mtshan."

In line with the Buddha-nature teachings and the prevalent Yogacara-Madhyamaka synthesis, Dölpopa interpreted śūnyatā as twofold, distinguishing the conventional "emptiness of self-nature" (rangtong), and the ultimate "emptiness of other" (shentong), which is the clear nature of mind. Dölpopa taught that emptiness of self-nature applied only to relative truth, while emptiness of other is characteristic of ultimate truth, i.e. ultimate Reality is not empty of its own uncreated and deathless Truth, but only of what is impermanent and illusory.

Dölpopa employed the term 'Self' or 'Soul' (atman) to refer to the ultimate truth, that, according to him, lay at the heart of all being. In his Mountain Doctrine work, he refers to this essence as the "Great Self", "True Self", "Diamond Self", "Supreme Self", "Solid Self" and "Supreme Self of all Creatures", basing himself on specific utterances and doctrines of the Buddha in the Mahāyāna Mahāparinirvāṇa Sūtra, the Aṅgulimālīya Sūtra and the Śrīmālādevī Siṃhanāda Sūtra, amongst others While most of his peers balk at such a term, there are still exponents of the Nyingma and Kagyu schools who are happy to see the heart of all beings as one unified, egoless Buddha-self. Shenpen Hookham, for example, writes affirmatively of the True Self in the teachings of Dölpopa and other great Buddhist masters, saying:

Absolute, Eternal True Self: Many venerable saints and scholars have argued for the Self in the past and do so in the present. Great teachers of the Tibetan Nyingma, Kagyu, and Sakya schools have and do argue that such a view [i.e. the reality of an essential, deathless Self] is fundamental to the practice of the Buddhist path and the attainment of Enlightenment.

Hookham further points out that Dölpopa (Note: Along with other representatives of this shentong tradition, including such Tibetan shentong masters as Rangjung Dorje, Mikyo Dorje, and Jamgon Kongtrul) really envisioned the Buddha within each being as an actual, living truth and presence, not conditioned or generated by any temporal process of causation:

The essential feature of a Shentong interpretation of tathāgatagarbha doctrine is that the Buddha is figuratively within all beings as their unchanging, permanent, non-conditioned nature... Buddha is by all [tathāgatagarbha-sutra] accounts considered to be non-conditioned, eternal, unchanging, bliss, compassion, wisdom, power, and so on. For Shentongpas [i.e. the adherents of a Shentong understanding of scripture] the fact that Buddha is non-conditioned means the essence of Buddha is complete with all the Buddha Qualities in a timeless sense'.

Dölpopa uses many scriptural citations to support his view, drawing upon sutras and tantras to substantiate his understanding of Mahayana and tantric teachings on definitive truth. As Cyrus Stearns writes in his monograph on Dölpopa, this scholar-monk made:

[T]he assertion that ultimate truth, referred to by terms such as tathāgatagarbha (Buddha-nature), dharmadhātu (expanse of reality), and dharmakāya (buddha-body of reality), is a permanent or eternal state. Of course, statements to this effect are not unusual in certain Mahayana sutras and treatises...For Dolpopa, all such statements in the scriptures and commentaries were of definitive meaning (nītārtha, nges don), and were to be understood literally.

Dölpopa also frequently makes use of such positive terms which he finds in the selfsame scriptures and tantras as 'permanent', 'everlasting, 'eternal' and 'Self' (Stearns, ibid.). This, Dölpopa claims, all pertains to the realm of Nirvana and is one with the Buddha-nature. It is not merely an intellectual view, but a direct experience of great bliss and this doctrine is (according to Dölpopa) communicated to Buddhists via the mediacy of the Mahayana Buddha-nature sutras:

The ultimate Mahayana is the vehicle of the Buddha-nature, and the ultimate Buddha-nature is great bliss.

This felicitous state is said to lie within the being, eternally. But within the samsaric mode of perceiving, it is not recognized, and darkness remains. Stearns brings out the distinction which Dölpopa draws here between samsara and nirvana, quoting Kalkin Pundarika to make the point:

[Samsaric] existence and nirvana are not identical, but like a shadow and the sun.

For Dölpopa, the indwelling Buddha (or Nirvana) is genuinely real, yet 'empty' in one sense - in that the internal Buddha or Buddha nature is empty of illusion, but replete with wondrous Buddha qualities. For Dölpopa and those who espouse analogous shentong doctrines:

[T]he whole point of establishing the empty nature of illusion (rangtong) is to discover the Reality of the Absolute Buddha Wisdom Mind (Paramarthabuddhajnana) beyond the reaches of the conceptual mind that can only function in terms of grasping its own creations.

Dölpopa further comments that worldlings believe that they have Self, happiness, permanence, and purity, but that they look in the wrong direction for these transcendental qualities, whereas those who have transcended the world use these terms meaningfully since they know where these qualities are to be found. Even having faith in the reality of these higher qualities helps remove spiritual veils:

Dolpopa explains that the worldling believes he has self, permanence, bliss, and purity; he sees these qualities in what does not have them. Those who are beyond the world also talk of Self, Permanence, Bliss, and Purity, but in their case, it is meaningful, because they know what really has these qualities. Dolpopa remarks that just to believe this removes many veils, thus emphasizing the power of faith.

Cyrus Stearns points out that for Dölpopa, spiritual awareness or jñāna is a key constituent of the Buddhist path and allows the practitioner to burn away veils of ignorance and thus to see the eternal qualities of the Buddha's body of reality (the Dharmakaya):

[T]he accumulation of gnosis (jnana) ... burns away all the veils that have been obscuring the spiritual qualities of the buddha-body of reality (dharmakaya), which is eternal and spontaneously present within each living being.

Dölpopa even wrote a prayer wishing that the Buddhas might take pity on those Buddhists who deem that the Emptiness taught by the Buddha is nothing more than a non-affirming negation and concerns only self-emptiness (the absence of essence in all things). Dölpopa writes on this point:

May they [the Buddhas] have pity on those who hold that the whole of the Buddha's teaching on emptiness concerned self-emptiness alone and hold them in their compassion.
May they [the Buddhas] have pity on those who hold that the whole of the Buddha's teaching on emptiness concerned a non-affirming negation alone, and hold them in their compassion.

Dölpopa also wrote a commentary on the Ratnagotravibhāga.

== Influence ==
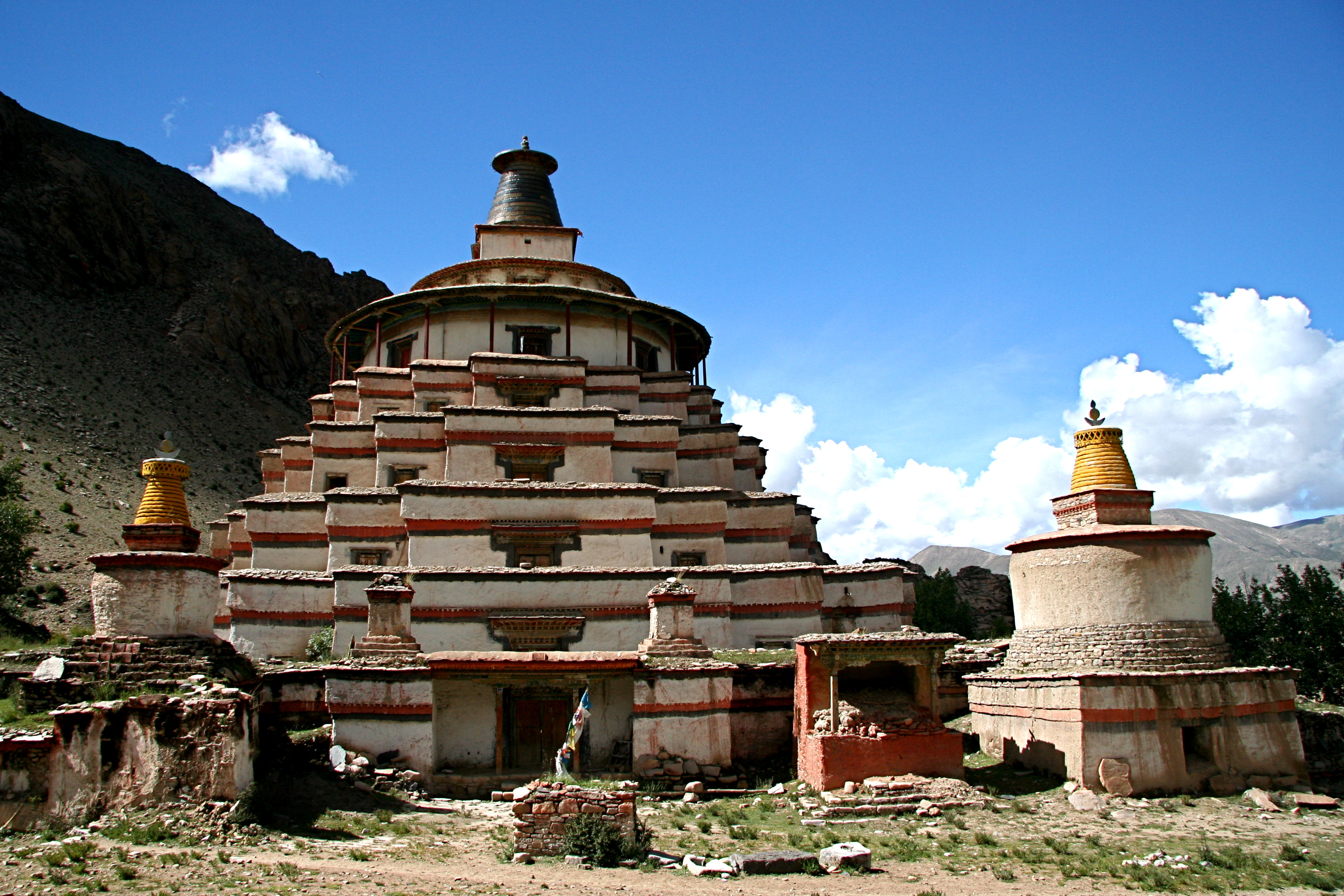
Dolpopa's Great Stupa at Jomonang, Tibet

Dölpopa found a strong supporter and advocate in the later Jonangpa lama, Taranatha, who was keen to spread Dölpopa's ideas. Cyrus Stearns comments on this:

Taranatha took upon himself the responsibility of causing Dolpopa's insights to once again to reach a wide audience, and was determined to revive what he saw as a priceless transmission lineage in danger of being lost.

=== Suppression ===
The entire corpus of Dölpopa's writings was completely suppressed by the dominant Gelug school for several hundred years, for both doctrinal and political reasons. The doctrinal reason was his approach to the Buddhist concept of śūnyatā (Wylie: stong pa nyid), distinguishing "emptiness of self-nature" (Wylie: rang stong, pronounced /rangtong/) from "emptiness of other" (Wylie: gzhan stong, pronounced /shentong/).

Guy Newland conveys the political intrigue of the 5th Dalai Lama against the Jonangpa, the king of gTsang, and the writings and philosophy of Dölpopa:

Tsong-ka-pa and his successors have been especially vehement in their objections to the views of Shay-rap-gyel-tsen (shes rab rgyal mtshan, 1292–1361) and his followers. Shay-rap-gyel-tsen, an abbot of Jo-mo-nang, formulated his view in Ocean of Definitive Meaning (nges don rgya mtsho) and other writings; his followers are called Jo-nang-bas. As Ge-luk political power reached its apogee under the Fifth Dalai Lama in the seventeenth century, the Jo-nang-bas were proscribed and their monasteries and other property were completely confiscated and converted to Ge-luk use. Tibet's intersectarian conflicts were almost always driven by motives more political than "purely philosophical", indeed, the Jo-nang-bas were allies of the king of Tsang (gtsang), the main political and military adversary of Ge-luk in the first half of the seventeenth century. On the other hand, for more than two hundred years before they destroyed the Jo-nang-ba order, the Ge-luk-bas had been denouncing Shay-rap-gyel-tsen's philosophy as something utterly beyond the pale of Mahāyāna Buddhism. [. . .] While the immediate occasion for the persecution of Jo-nang was its defeat in a power struggle, proscription suggested itself as a penalty in the context of a long history of substantial and deeply felt philosophical differences. This hostility is reflected in the banning of Shay-rap-gyel-tsen's major books from the premises of Ge-luk monasteries more than 150 years prior to his order's extinction.

== Written works ==
- Ocean of Definitive Meaning (Wylie: Ri chos Nges don rGya mtsho)
- Great Calculation of the Doctrine that have the Significance of a Fourth Council (with auto commentary)
- Prayer for Birth in Sukhāvatī (bDe ba can du skye ba ’dzin pa’i smon lam)
- An Official Document of the King, the Spontaneously Present Dharmakāya
- A General Commentary on all Profound Sutra and Tantra Teachings: Entitled, "Knowing One, All is Liberated"
- Buddha Nature’s Auspiciousness
- The Great Praise of Shambhala
- Seizing the Crucial Point
- An Instruction to Lhaje Tsultrim O
- In Praise of the Eight Siddhas
- Praise to the Mahasiddha Shavaripa
- Mountain Doctrine, Ocean of Definitive Meaning: Final Unique Quintessential Instructions. Translation: Jeffrey Hopkins (2017), Mountain Doctrine: Tibet's Fundamental Treatise on Other-Emptiness and the Buddha Matrix, Shambhala
- A General Explanation of Buddha’s Teaching
- Dolpopa's complete works in 13 volumes, Pe Cin edition
- Dolpopa's complete works in 8 volumes, 'Dzam Thang edition
- Dolpopa's complete works in 1 volumes, Gyantse edition

== See also ==
- Ātman (Buddhism)
- God in Buddhism

== Sources ==
- Dolpopa Shesrab Rgyalmtshan (2006). Mountain doctrine : Tibet's fundamental treatise on other-emptiness and the Buddha-matrix. Ithaca, NY: Snow Lion Publ. ISBN 978-1559392389.
- Hookham, Susan K. (1991). The Buddha within: Tathagatagarbha doctrine according to the Shentong interpretation of the Ratnagotravibhaga. Albany, NY: State University of New York Press. ISBN 978-0791403587.
- Gruschke, A. (2000). The Jonangpa Order - Causes for the downfall, conditions of the survival and current situation of a presumably extinct Tibetan-Buddhist School. Ninth Seminar of The International Association for Tibetan Studies
- Gruschke, Andreas (2001). The Cultural Monuments of Tibet's Outer Provinces: The Gansu and Sichuan Parts of Amdo, Vol 2. Bangkok: White Lotus Press. ISBN 978-9747534900.
- Mullin, Glenn H. (2001). The fourteen Dalai Lamas : a sacred legacy of reincarnation (1st ed.). Santa Fe, NM: Clear Light Publishers. ISBN 9781574160390.
- Newland, Guy (1992). The two truths in the Mādhyamika philosophy of the Ge-luk-ba order of Tibetan Buddhism (1st ed.). Ithaca, NY: Snow Lion Publications. ISBN 978-0937938799.
- Newman, John. (2017). "'Developmental' versus 'Revelatory' Soteriology in the Kālacakra Tantra". Journal of the International Association of Buddhist Studies. 40: 209–224. doi:10.2143/JIABS.40.0.3269009..
- Stearns, Cyrus (2010). The Buddha from Dölpo : a study of the life and thought of the Tibetan master Dölpopa Sherab Gyaltsen (Rev. and enl. ed.). Ithaca, NY: Snow Lion Publications. ISBN 978-1559393430.
- Stearns, Cyrus (August 2008). "Dolpopa Sherab Gyeltsen". The Treasury of Lives: Biographies of Himalayan Religious Masters.
